= C7H12 =

The molecular formula C_{7}H_{12} (molar mass: 96.17 g/mol, exact mass: 96.0939 u) may refer to:

- Cycloheptene
- Heptyne
- Methylcyclohexenes
  - 1-Methylcyclohexene
  - 3-Methylcyclohexene
  - 4-Methylcyclohexene
- Methylenecyclohexane
- Norbornane
- Norcarane
- Vinylcyclopentane
