= Lewis acid catalysis =

Use of metal-based Lewis acids to catalyze organic reactions

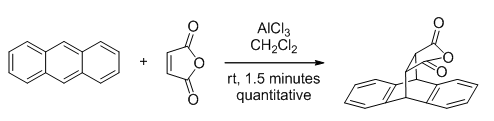
The first Lewis acid-catalyzed Diels–Alder reaction

In organic chemistry, Lewis acid catalysis is the use of metal-based Lewis acids as catalysts for organic reactions. The acids act as an electron pair acceptor to increase the reactivity of a substrate. Common Lewis acid catalysts are based on main group metals such as aluminum, boron, silicon, and tin, as well as many early (titanium, zirconium) and late (iron, copper, zinc) d-block metals. The metal atom forms an adduct with a lone-pair bearing electronegative atom in the substrate, such as oxygen (both sp^{2} or sp^{3}), nitrogen, sulfur, and halogens. The complexation has partial charge-transfer character and makes the lone-pair donor effectively more electronegative, activating the substrate toward nucleophilic attack, heterolytic bond cleavage, or cycloaddition with 1,3-dienes and 1,3-dipoles.

Many classical reactions involving carbon–carbon or carbon–heteroatom bond formation can be catalyzed by Lewis acids. Examples include the Friedel-Crafts reaction, the aldol reaction, and various pericyclic processes that proceed slowly at room temperature, such as the Diels-Alder reaction and the ene reaction. In addition to accelerating the reactions, Lewis acid catalysts are able to impose regioselectivity and stereoselectivity in many cases.

Early developments in Lewis acid reagents focused on easily available compounds such as TiCl_{4}, BF_{3}, SnCl_{4}, and AlCl_{3}. Over the years, versatile catalysts bearing ligands designed for specific applications have facilitated improvement in both reactivity and selectivity of Lewis acid-catalyzed reactions. More recently, Lewis acid catalysts with chiral ligands have become an important class of tools for asymmetric catalysis.

Challenges in the development of Lewis acid catalysis include inefficient catalyst turnover (caused by catalyst affinity for the product) and the frequent requirement of two-point binding for stereoselectivity, which often necessitates the use of auxiliary groups.

== Mechanism ==
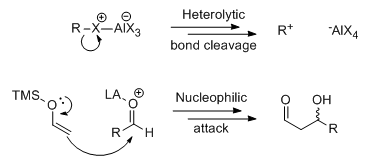
Two common modes of Lewis acid catalysis in reactions with polar mechanisms

In reactions with polar mechanisms, Lewis acid catalysis often involves binding of the catalyst to Lewis basic heteroatoms and withdrawing electron density, which in turn facilitates heterolytic bond cleavage (in the case of Friedel-Crafts reaction) or directly activates the substrate toward nucleophilic attack (in the case of carbonyl addition reactions). The dichotomy can have important consequences in some reactions, as in the case of Lewis acid-promoted acetal substitution reactions, where the S_{N}1 and S_{N}2 mechanisms shown below may give different stereochemical outcomes. Studying the product ratio in a bicyclic system, Denmark and colleagues showed that both mechanisms could be operative depending on the denticity of the Lewis acid and the identity of the R' group.

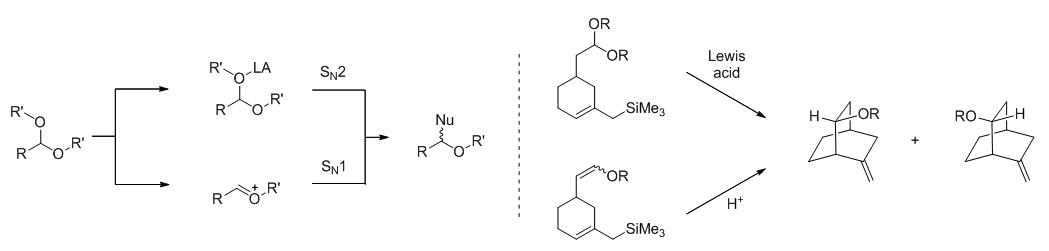
(Left) Lewis acid-promoted acetal substitution may proceed via either the S_{N}1 or the S_{N}2 mechanism. (Right) Denmark's model system for acetal substitution mechanism. If the S_{N}1 mechanism is operative for the acetal substitution, the two reactions shown here should proceed via the same oxocarbenium ion and give similar stereochemical outcomes. Results indicate that the mechanism varies depending on the Lewis acid and the R group.

In Diels-Alder and 1,3-dipolar cycloaddition reactions, Lewis acids lower the LUMO energy of the dienophile or dipolarophile, respectively, making it more reactive toward the diene or the dipole.

== Lewis acid catalysis with carbonyl-containing substrates ==
Among the types of reactions that can be catalyzed by Lewis acids, those with carbonyl-containing substrates have received the greatest amount of attention. The first major discovery in this area was in 1960, when Yates and Eaton reported the significant acceleration of the Diels-Alder reaction by AlCl_{3} when maleic anhydride is the dienophile.

Early theoretical studies that depended on frontier orbital analysis established that Lewis acid catalysis operates via lowering of the dienophile's LUMO energy. Recent studies, however, have shown that this rationale behind Lewis acid-catalyzed Diels-Alder reactions is incorrect. It is found that Lewis acids accelerate the Diels-Alder reaction by reducing the destabilizing steric Pauli repulsion between the interacting diene and dienophile and not by lowering the energy of the dienophile's LUMO and consequently, enhancing the normal electron demand orbital interaction. The Lewis acid bind via a donor-acceptor interaction to the dienophile and via that mechanism polarizes occupied orbital density away from the reactive C=C double bond of the dienophile towards the Lewis acid. This reduced occupied orbital density on C=C double bond of the dienophile will, in turn, engage in a less repulsive closed-shell-closed-shell orbital interaction with the incoming diene, reducing the destabilizing steric Pauli repulsion and hence lowers the Diels-Alder reaction barrier. In addition, the Lewis acid catalyst also increases the asynchronicity of the Diels-Alder reaction, making the occupied π-orbital located on the C=C double bond of the dienophile asymmetric. As a result, this enhanced asynchronicity leads to an extra reduction of the destabilizing steric Pauli repulsion as well as a diminishing pressure on the reactants to deform, in other words, it reduced the destabilizing activation strain (also known as distortion energy). This working catalytic mechanism is known as Pauli-lowering catalysis, which is operative in a variety of organic reactions.

The original rationale behind Lewis acid-catalyzed Diels-Alder reactions is incorrect, because besides lowering the energy of the dienophile's LUMO, the Lewis acid also lowers the energy of the HOMO of the dienophile and hence increases the inverse electron demand LUMO-HOMO orbital energy gap. Thus, indeed Lewis acid catalysts strengthen the normal electron demand orbital interaction by lowering the LUMO of the dienophile, but, they simultaneously weaken the inverse electron demand orbital interaction by also lowering the energy of the dienophile's HOMO. These two counteracting phenomena effectively cancel each other, resulting in nearly unchanged orbital interactions when compared to the corresponding uncatalyzed Diels-Alder reactions and making this not the active mechanism behind Lewis acid-catalyzed Diels-Alder reactions.

In addition to rate acceleration, Lewis acid-catalyzed reactions sometimes exhibit enhanced stereoselectivity, which stimulated the development of stereoinduction models. The models have their roots in knowledge of the structures of Lewis acid-carbonyl complexes which, through decades of research in theoretical calculations, NMR spectroscopy, and X-ray crystallography, were fairly firmly established in the early 1990s:

- σ-Complexation: The complex in which the Lewis acid interacts with the carbonyl compound through a σ-bond with the oxygen lone pair is both thermodynamically favored and catalytically relevant. Several transition metal complexes of aldehydes and ketones have been characterized crystallographically.
- Bent geometry: The metal-oxygen-carbon bond angle is less than 180°, and the metal is syn to the smaller substituent, unless influenced by a chelating group on the larger substituent.
- An s-trans preference for α,β-unsaturated compounds.

=== Addition and conjugate addition to carbonyl compounds ===
The Mukaiyama aldol reaction and the Sakurai reaction refer to the addition of silyl enol ethers and allylsilanes to carbonyl compounds, respectively. Only under Lewis acid catalysis are the reactions useful for synthesis. Acyclic transition states are believed to be operating in both reactions for either 1,2- or 1,4- addition, and steric factors control stereoselectivity. This is in contrast with the rigid Zimmerman-Traxler cyclic transition state that has been widely accepted for the aldol reaction with lithium, boron, and titanium enolates. As a consequence, the double bond geometry in the silyl enol ether or allylsilane does not translate well into product stereochemistry. A model for the Sakurai 1,2-addition, proposed by Kumada, is presented in the scheme below; the syn diastereomer is predominant when the (E) silane is used, and also slightly favored when the (Z) silane is used. A similar analysis by Heathcock explains the fact that, with simple substrates, there is essentially no diastereoselectivity for the intermolecular Mukaiyama aldol reaction.

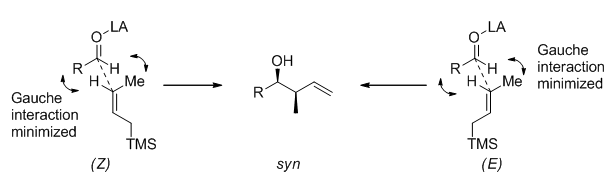
Open transition state model for Sakurai reaction

The Lewis acid catalyst plays a role in stereoselectivity when the aldehyde can chelate onto the metal center and form a rigid cyclic intermediate. The stereochemical outcome is then consistent with approach of the nucleophile anti to the more bulky substituent on the ring.

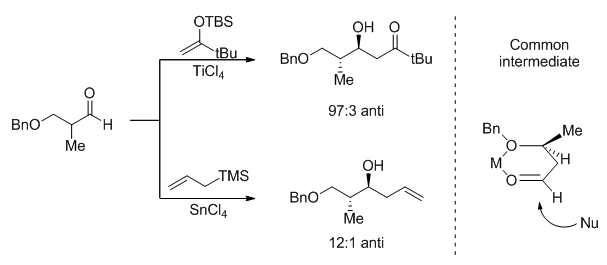
Chelating control on Mukaiyama and Sakurai reactions.PNG

=== Diels-Alder reaction ===
Lewis acids such as ZnCl_{2}, BF_{3}, SnCl_{4}, AlCl_{3}, and MeAlCl_{2} can catalyze both normal and inverse electron demand Diels-Alder reactions. The enhancement in rate is often dramatic, and regioselectivity towards ortho- or para-like products is often improved, as shown in the reaction between isoprene and methyl acrylate.

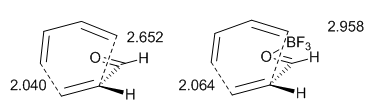
The transition state geometries of Diels-Alder reaction under thermal (left) and BF_{3}-catalyzed conditions (right). The lengths of the forming bonds (in angstroms) are shown, indicating a more asynchronous transition state for the catalyzed reaction.

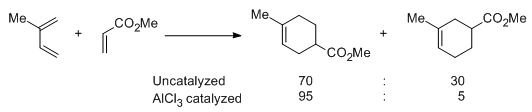
Regioselectivity of a Diels-Alder reaction with and without AlCl_{3} catalysis

The catalyzed Diels-Alder reaction is believed to be concerted. A computational study at the B3LYP/6-31G(d) level has shown, however, that the transition state of the BF_{3}-catalyzed Diels-Alder reaction between propenal and 1,3-butadiene is more asynchronous than that of the thermal reaction – the bond further from the carbonyl group is formed ahead of the other bond.

=== Ene reaction ===
The carbonyl-ene reaction is almost always catalyzed by Lewis acids in synthetic applications. A stepwise or a largely asynchronous mechanism has been proposed for the catalyzed reaction based on kinetic isotope effect studies. Nonetheless, cyclic transition states are frequently invoked to interpret diastereoselectivity. In a seminal review in the early 1990s, Mikami and colleagues proposed a late, chair-like transition state, which could rationalize many observed stereochemical results, including the role of steric bulk in diastereoselectivity:

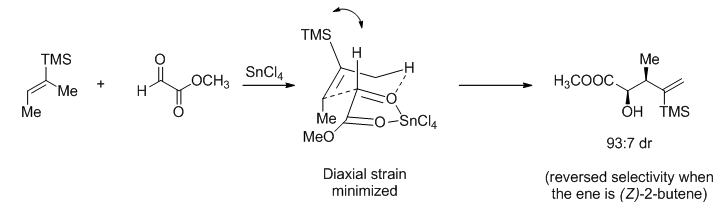
Ene reaction selectivity by steric bulk

More recently, however, the same group carried out HF/6-31G* calculations on tin or aluminum Lewis acid-catalyzed ene reactions. Citing that methyl glyoxylate chelates tin Lewis acids but not aluminum ones, they invoked an early, envelope-like transition state and rationalized the divergent stereochemical outcome of the ene reaction between (E)-2-butene and methyl glyoxylate.

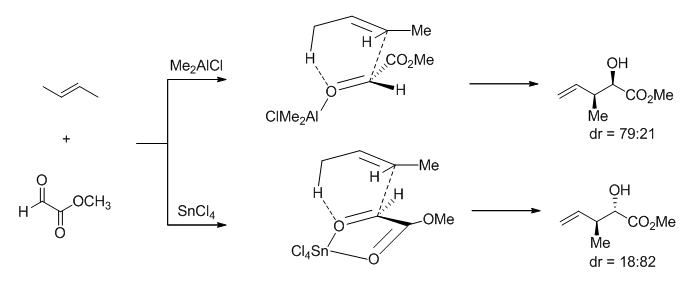
Divergent stereochemical outcome of the ene reaction between (E)-2-butene and methyl glyoxylate.

=== Application in synthesis ===
Lewis-acid catalyzed carbonyl addition reactions are routinely used to form carbon–carbon bonds in natural product synthesis. The first two reactions shown below are from the syntheses of (+)-lycoflexine and zaragozic acid C, respectively, which are direct applications of Sakurai and Mukaiyama reactions. The third reaction, en route to (+)-fawcettimine, is a Lewis-acid catalyzed cyclopropane opening that is analogous to a Mukaiyama-Michael reaction.

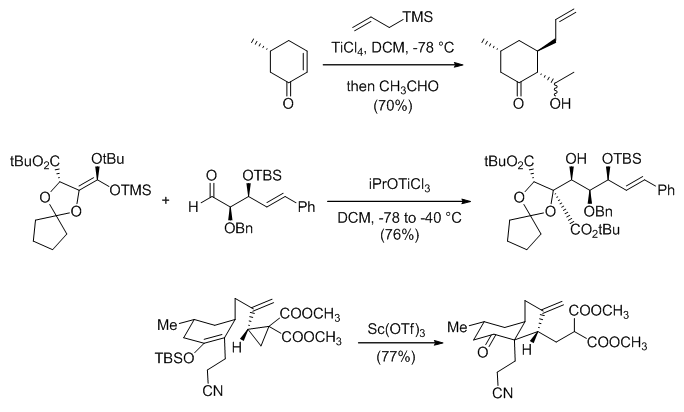
Lewis acid catalyzed carbonyl addition in natural product synthesis

The Diels-Alder reaction catalyzed or promoted by Lewis acids is a powerful and widely used method in natural product synthesis to attain scaffold complexity in a single step with stereochemical control. The two reactions shown below are an intramolecular Diels-Alder reaction towards (−)-fusarisetin A and an intermolecular hetero-Diels-Alder reaction towards (−)-epibatidine, respectively.

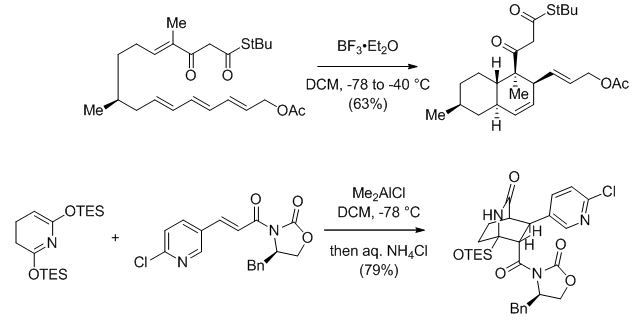
Lewis acid catalyzed carbonyl addition in natural product synthesis

== Friedel–Crafts and related reactions ==
In Friedel–Crafts alkylation, a Lewis acid – usually a simple metal halide salt – promotes heterolytic cleavage of a carbon–halogen bond in an alkyl halide and generates a carbocation, which undergoes electrophilic aromatic substitution. Although vastly useful in synthesis, the reaction often suffers from side reactions that arise from carbocation rearrangement, alkyl migration, and over-alkylation. Similarly, in Friedel-Crafts acylation, a Lewis acid assists in the generation of an acylium ion from an acid chloride (or occasionally acid anhydride). Although the acylium ion is often assumed to be the active intermediate, there is evidence that the protonated acylium dication is the active electrophile that undergoes subsequent electrophilic aromatic substitution.

Important variants of the Friedel–Crafts reaction include chloromethylation (with formaldehyde and HCl), formylation (with HCl and CO or CN^{−}), and acylation with a nitrile as the acyl source. The nitrile-based acylation is particularly useful because it allows direct ortho-acylation of aniline without protecting the amine group. A combination of a weak and a strong Lewis acid is necessary for the reaction to proceed, through the mechanism shown below. Guided by this mechanism, and equipped with knowledge that gallium trihalides are among the strongest Lewis acids, process chemists at Merck were able to develop highly efficient conditions for this condition towards a drug candidate.

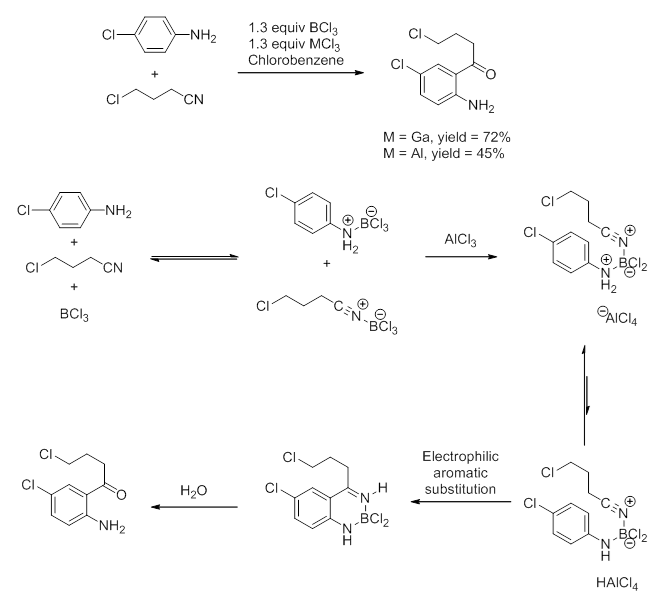
Sugasawa reaction

== Asymmetric Lewis acid catalysis ==
=== Common Chiral Ligands ===
Asymmetric catalysis by Lewis acids rely on catalysts with chiral ligands coordinated to the metal center. Over the years, a small number of chiral ligand scaffolds have stood out as having "privileged" catalytic properties suitable for a wide range of applications, often of unrelated mechanisms. Current research efforts in asymmetric Lewis acid catalysis mostly utilize or modify those ligands rather than create new scaffolds de novo. The "privileged" scaffolds share a few common features, including chemical stability and relative ease of elaboration. The majority of the scaffolds are multidentate. Most of them also have high scaffold rigidity within the ligand. Several of them have fairly mature stereoinduction models available. Some "privileged" scaffolds, as identified by Jacobsen and Zhou, are introduced below.

==== Bisoxazolines (BOX) ====
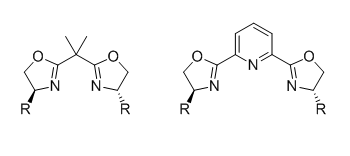
Generic structure of BOX (left) and PyBOX (right) ligands.

Most common chiral bisoxazoline (BOX) ligands consist of two identical chiral oxazoline moieties, substituted by a bulky group at the 4-positions, joined by a linker. The ligand is bidentate when the linker is a single carbon unit, but is tridentate (usually meridional) when the linker bears an additional coordinating atom, such as a pyridine nitrogen in the case of PyBOX ligands. The impact of ligand denticity and active intermediate geometry on the stereochemical outcome has been thoroughly reviewed.

Many bidentate BOX-based Lewis acid-catalyzed reactions are based on copper(II) catalysts with substrates that are suitable for two-point binding. The stereochemical outcome is consistent with a twisted square planar intermediate that was proposed based on related crystal structures. The substituent at the oxazoline's 4-position blocks one enantiotopic face of the substrate, leading to enantioselectivity. This is demonstrated in the following aldol-type reaction, but is applicable to a wide variety of reactions such as Mannich-type reactions, ene reaction, Michael addition, Nazarov cyclization, and hetero-Diels-Alder reaction.

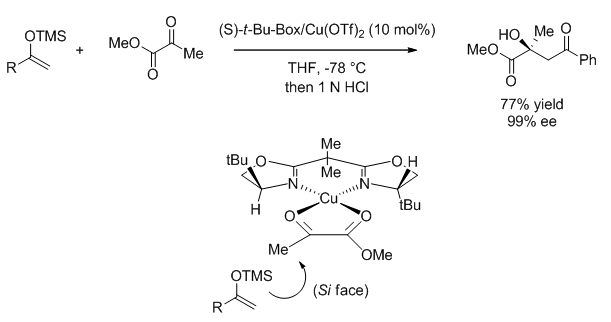
Box Stereochemical model

On the other hand, two-point binding on a Lewis acid bearing the meridionally tridentate PyBOX ligand would result in a square pyramidal complex. A study using benzyloxyacetaldehyde as the electrophile showed that the stereochemical outcome is consistent with the carbonyl oxygen binding equatorially and the ether oxygen binding axially.

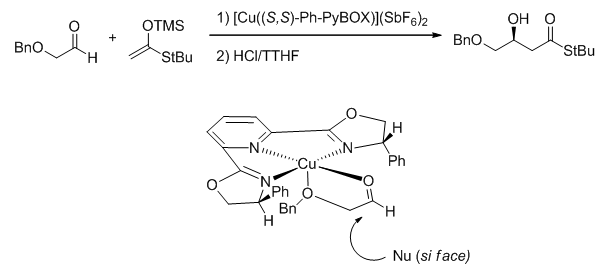
PyBox Stereochemical model

==== BINAP ====
Developed by Noyori, BINAP (2,2'-diphenylphosphino-1,1'-binaphthyl) is a family of chiral diphosphine ligands featuring two triarylphosphine moieties installed on a binaphthalene backbone. BINAP chelates onto a metal (usually a late transition metal) to form a C_{2}-symmetric complex. As shown below in the structure of an (R)-BINAP ruthenium complex, among the four remaining coordination sites on an octahedral metal center, the two equatorial sites (purple) are strongly influenced by the equatorial phenyl groups, while the two axial sites (green) are influenced by the axial phenyl groups.

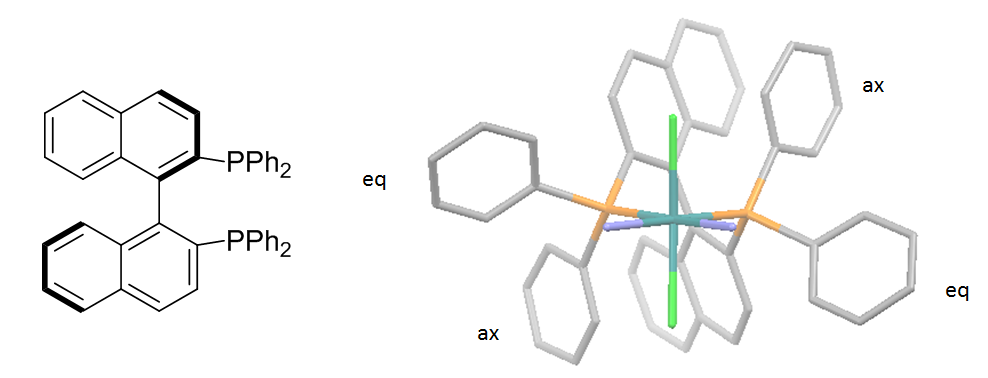
Left: Structure of (R)-BINAP. Right: Structure of an (R)-BINAP ruthenium complex, highlighting the equatorial (purple) and axial (green) coordination sites, and the equatorial and axial phenyl groups that enforce the asymmetric environment for incoming ligands.

Based on the structure, models for the observed enantioselectivity in many BINAP-based Lewis acid-catalyzed reactions have been proposed. For example, in the palladium-catalyzed enantioselective Diels-Alder reaction shown below, the dienophile is thought to coordinate the metal center at the equatorial sites. Thus the equatorial phenyl group on phosphorus obstructs the Si-face, resulting in excellent enantioselectivity. A very similar model was used to rationalize the outcome of a nickel-catalyzed asymmetric enolate alkylation reaction, where the substrate also bears an auxiliary that allows it to chelate onto the metal. On the other hand, a copper(I)-catalyzed hetero-ene reaction is thought to proceed through a tetrahedral intermediate, offering an alternative mode of stereoinduction by changing the metal center.

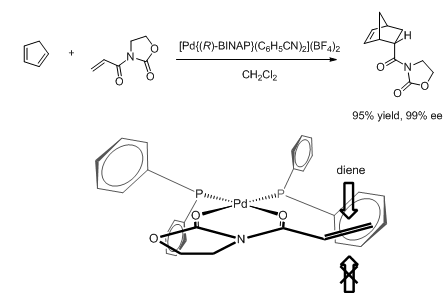
A BINAP-palladium-catalyzed asymmetric Diels-Alder reaction. In the model for the reaction intermediate, the binaphthyl rings are omitted for clarity.

==== BINOL ====
BINOL (1,1'-binaphthyl-2,2'-diol) is usually used in conjunction with oxophilic Lewis acidic metals such as aluminum, titanium, zirconium, and various rare earth metals. In cases where BINOL itself does not provide ideal enantioselective control, it can be readily elaborated by substitution at the 3,3' positions (via lithiation) and 6,6' positions (via the 6,6'-dibromide compound prepared by electrophilic aromatic substitution) to modulate steric bulk and electronic properties. For instance, aluminum catalysts based on bulky 3,3'-disilyl substituted BINOL have been developed as early examples of catalytic asymmetric hetero-Diels-Alder reaction and Claisen rearrangement, while introduction of electron-withdrawing groups at the 6,6'-positions was crucial for increasing the Lewis acidity, and hence catalytic activity, of zirconium(IV) catalysts toward a Mannich-type reaction. To date, however, no model for the crucial factors governing BINOL-directed stereoinduction has been generally accepted.

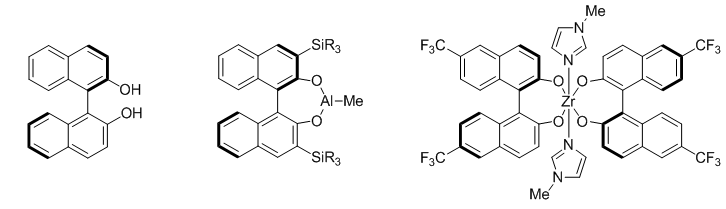
Left: (R)-BINOL. Center: Aluminum catalyst based on bulky 3,3'-disilyl substituted BINOL. Right: Zirconium catalyst based on BINOL substituted at 6 and 6' positions by electron-withdrawing trifluoromethyl group.

==== TADDOL ====
TADDOL stands for tetraaryl-1,3-dioxolane-4,5-dimethanol. The broad application of titanium TADDOLate catalysts towards carbonyl additions and cycloadditions has been introduced by Seebach and coworkers, and has been thoroughly summarized in a seminal review, in which a working stereoinduction model that agreed with the observed selectivity in a wide variety of reactions was put forth, despite the lack of a clear picture of the mechanism.

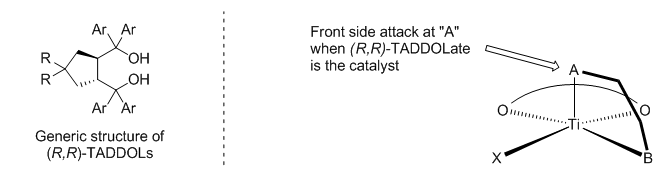
TADDOL stereomodel by Seebach

=== Applications ===
Lewis acid catalysis has been used in the asymmetry-setting step for the syntheses of many natural products. The first reaction shown below, from the synthesis of taxane skeleton, uses a copper-based catalyst supported by a chiral phosphoramidite ligand for a conjugate carbonyl addition reaction. The second reaction, from the synthesis of ent-hyperforin, uses an iron-PyBOX catalyst for an asymmetric Diels-Alder reaction.

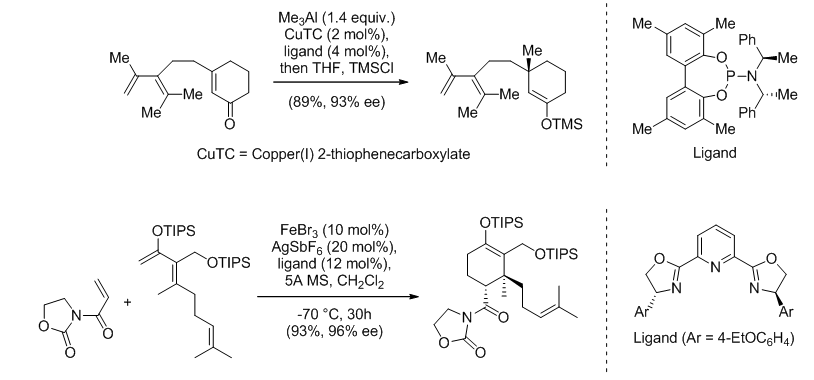
Asymmetric Lewis acid catalysis in natural product synthesis

== See also ==
- Lewis acid
- Chiral Lewis acid
- Catalysis
- Enantioselective synthesis
