= C7H8 =

The molecular formula C_{7}H_{8} (molar mass: 92.14 g/mol) may refer to:

- Cycloheptatriene
- Isotoluenes
- Norbornadiene
- Quadricyclane
- Toluene, or toluol
