= Chiral Lewis acid =

Type of Lewis acid catalyst

Chiral Lewis acids (CLAs) are a type of Lewis acid catalyst. These acids affect the chirality of the substrate as they react with it. In such reactions, synthesis favors the formation of a specific enantiomer or diastereomer. The method is an enantioselective asymmetric synthesis reaction. Since they affect chirality, they produce optically active products from optically inactive or mixed starting materials. This type of preferential formation of one enantiomer or diastereomer over the other is formally known as asymmetric induction. In this kind of Lewis acid, the electron-accepting atom is typically a metal, such as indium, zinc, lithium, aluminium, titanium, or boron. The chiral-altering ligands employed for synthesizing these acids often have multiple Lewis basic sites (often a diol or a dinitrogen structure) that allow the formation of a ring structure involving the metal atom.

Achiral Lewis acids have been used for decades to promote the synthesis of racemic mixtures in myriad different reactions. Since the 1960s, chemists have used Chiral Lewis acids to induce enantioselective reactions. This is useful when the desired product is a specific enantiomer, as is common in drug synthesis. Common reaction types include Diels–Alder reactions, the ene reaction, [2+2] cycloaddition reactions, hydrocyanation of aldehydes, and most notably, Sharpless epoxidations.

== Theory ==
Figure 2. Top: Gibbs Free Energy diagram depicting single-step reaction where an achiral Lewis acid is catalyzing the formation of a racemic mixture of products from racemic starting materials. Bottom: Gibbs free energy diagram depicting the same reaction when a chiral Lewis acid is used as the catalyst

The enantioselectivity of CLAs derives from their ability to perturb the free energy barrier along with the reaction coordinate pathway that leads to either the R- or S- enantiomer. Ground state diastereomers and enantiomers are of equal energy in the ground state, and when reacted with an achiral Lewis acid, their diastereomeric intermediates, transition states, and products are also of equal energy. This leads to the production of racemic mixtures. However, when a CLA is used in the same reaction, the energetic barrier of formation of one diastereomer is less than that of another; the reaction is under kinetic control. If the difference in the energy barriers between the diastereomeric transition states are of sufficient magnitude, then a high enantiomeric excess of one isomer is observed.

== Asymmetric synthesis ==
=== Diels–Alder reaction ===
Diels–Alder reactions occur between a conjugated diene and an alkene (commonly known as the dienophile). This cycloaddition process allows for the stereoselective formation of cyclohexene rings capable of possessing as many as four contiguous stereogenic centers.

Diels–Alder reactions can lead to the formation of a variety of structural isomers and stereoisomers. Molecular orbital theory considers that the endo transition state, instead of the exo transition state, is favored (endo addition rule). Also, augmented secondary orbital interactions have been postulated as the source of enhanced endo diastereoselection.

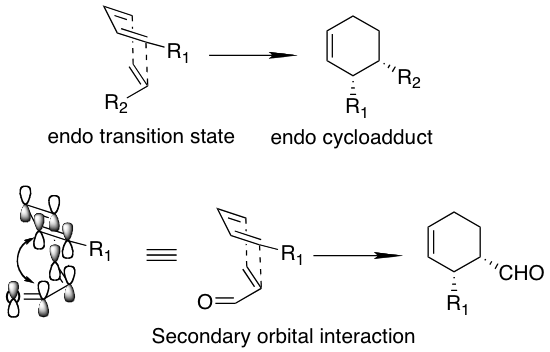

Usually, CLAs are employed to activate the dienophile. A typical CLA catalyst is derived from a Mg^{2+} center made chiral by attachment of a binol- phosphate ester. CLAs have been applied to a number of intramolecular Diels–Alder reactions.

A complex derived from diethylaluminium chloride and a “vaulted” biaryl ligand below catalyzes the enantioselective Diels–Alder reaction between cyclopentadiene and methacrolein. The chiral ligand is recovered quantitatively by silica gel chromatography.

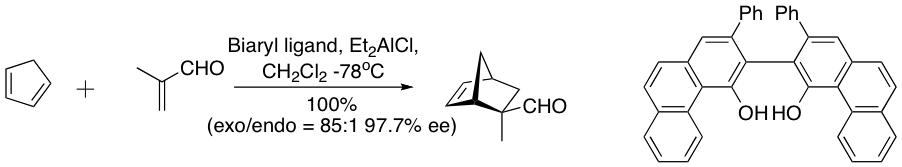

The chiral (acyloxy) borane (CAB) complex is effective in catalyzing a number of aldehyde Diels–Alder reactions. NMR spectroscopic experiments have indicated close proximity of the aldehyde and the aryl ring. Pi stacking between the aryl group and aldehyde has been suggested as an organizational feature that imparts high enantioselectivity to the cycloaddition.

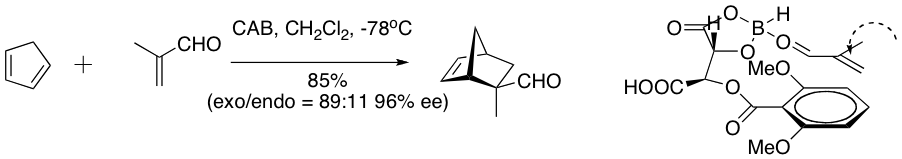

Bronsted acid-assisted chiral Lewis acid (BLA) catalyzes a number of diene-aldehyde cycloaddition reactions.

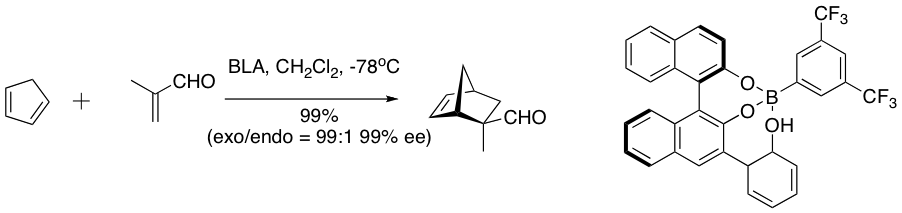

=== Aldol reaction ===
In the aldol reaction, the diastereoselectivity of the product is often dictated by the geometry of the enolate. The Zimmerman–Traxler model predicts that the Z enolate will give syn products, and that E enolates will give anti products. Reactions catalyzed by tin-based CLAs allow products to deviate from this pattern.

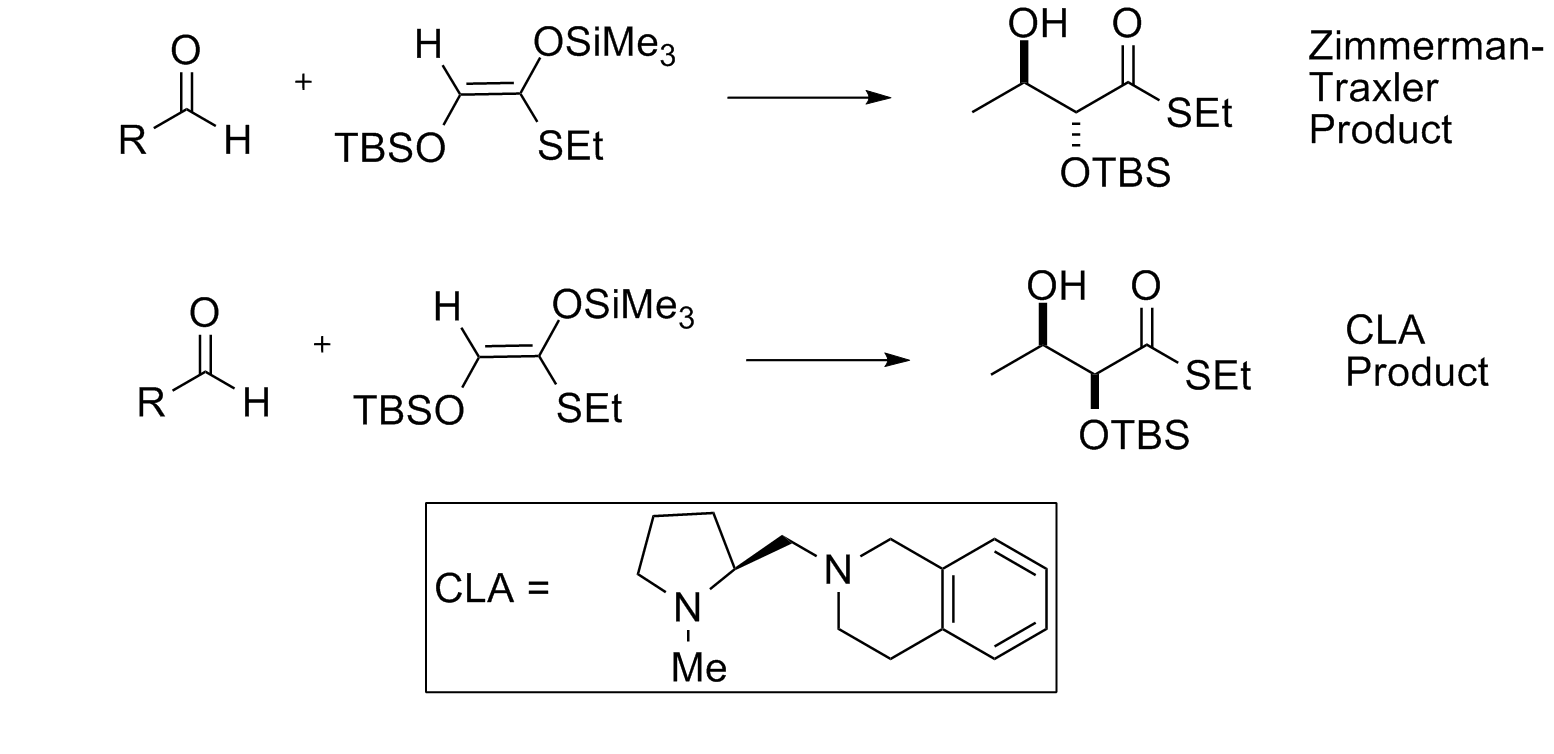

The transition structures for reactions with both the R and S catalyst enantiomers are:

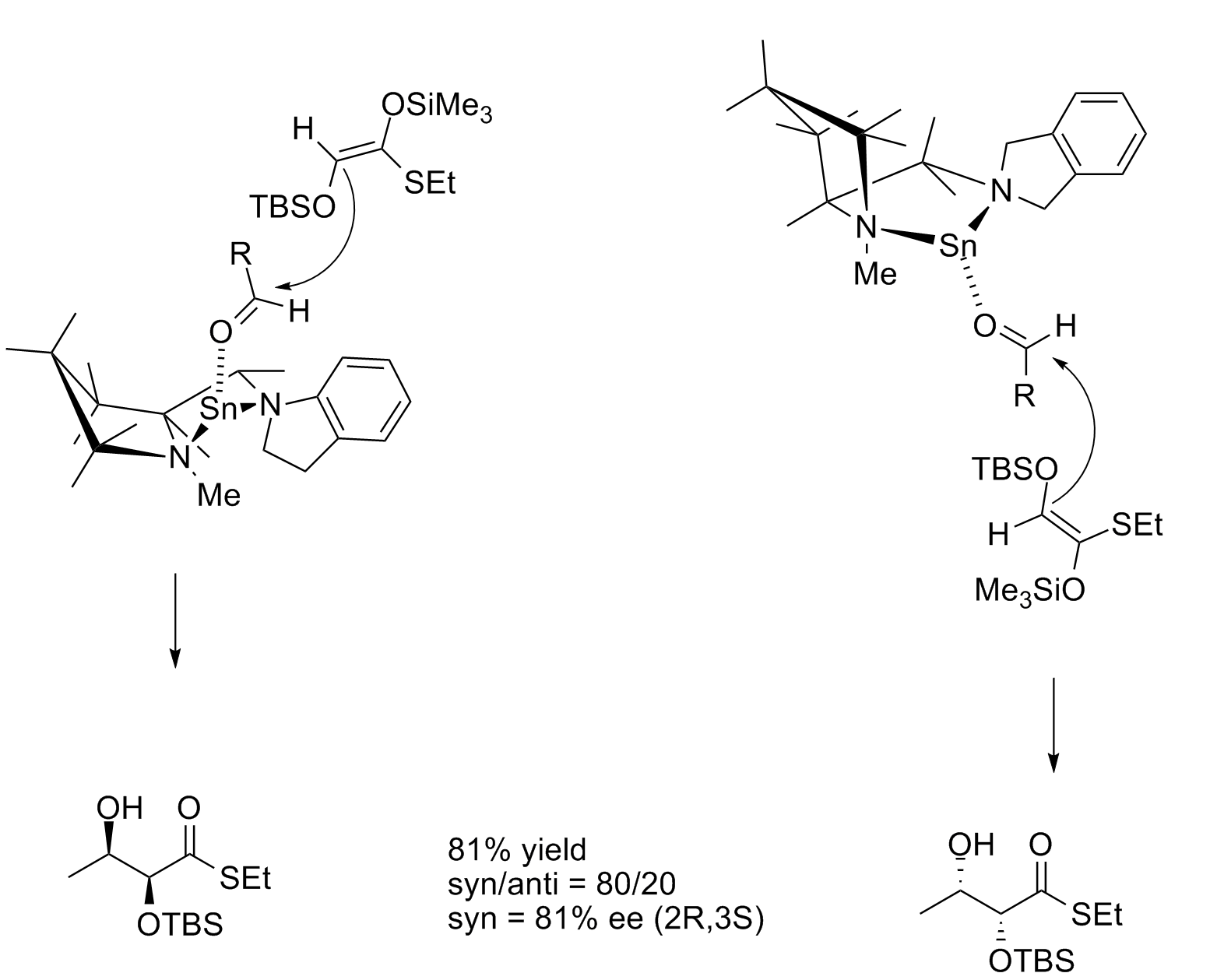

=== Baylis–Hillman reaction ===
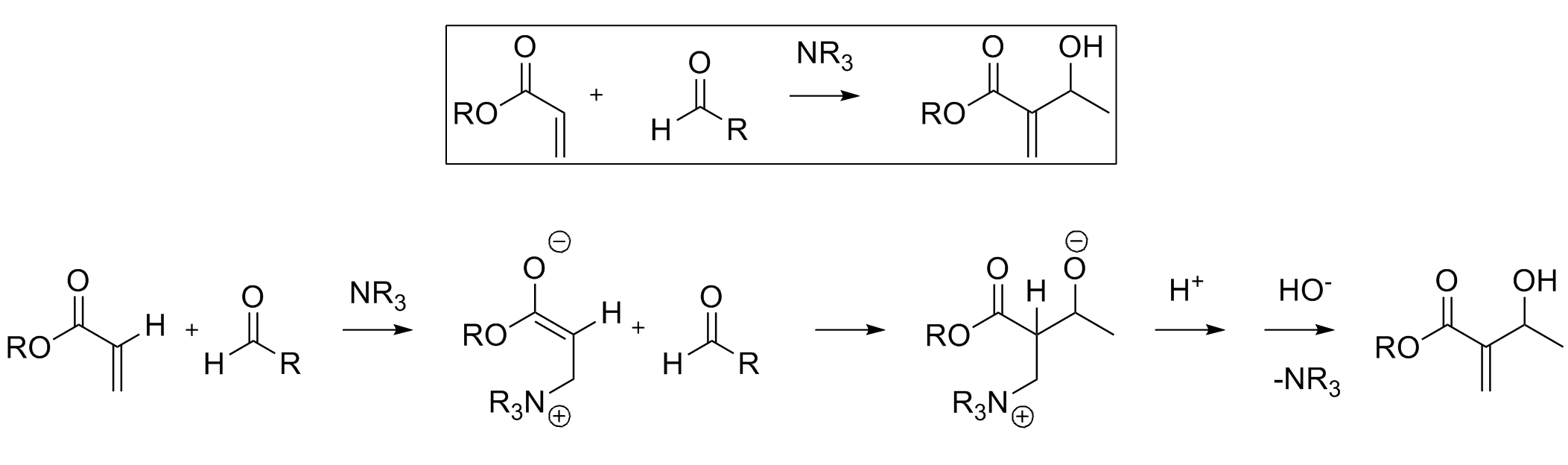

The Baylis–Hillman reaction is a route for C-C bond formation between an alpha, beta-unsaturated carbonyl and an aldehyde, which requires a nucleophilic catalyst, usually a tertiary amine, for a Michael-type addition and elimination. The stereoselectivity of these reactions is usually poor. Lanthanum(III)-containing CLAs have been demonstrated to improve stereoselectivity. Similarly, a chiral amine may also be used to achieve stereoselectivity.

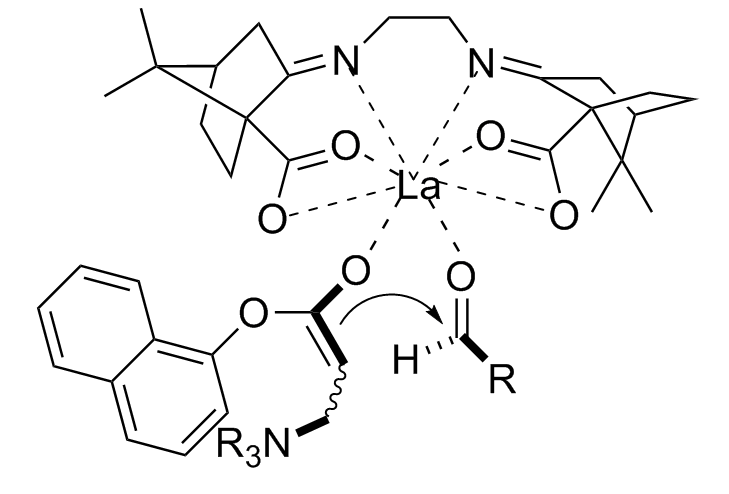

The product obtained by the reaction using the chiral catalyst was obtained in good yield with excellent enantioselectivity.

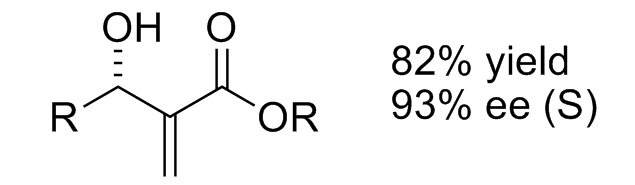

=== Ene reaction ===
Chiral Lewis acids have proven useful in the ene reaction. When catalyzed by an achiral Lewis acid, the reaction normally provides good diastereoselectivity.

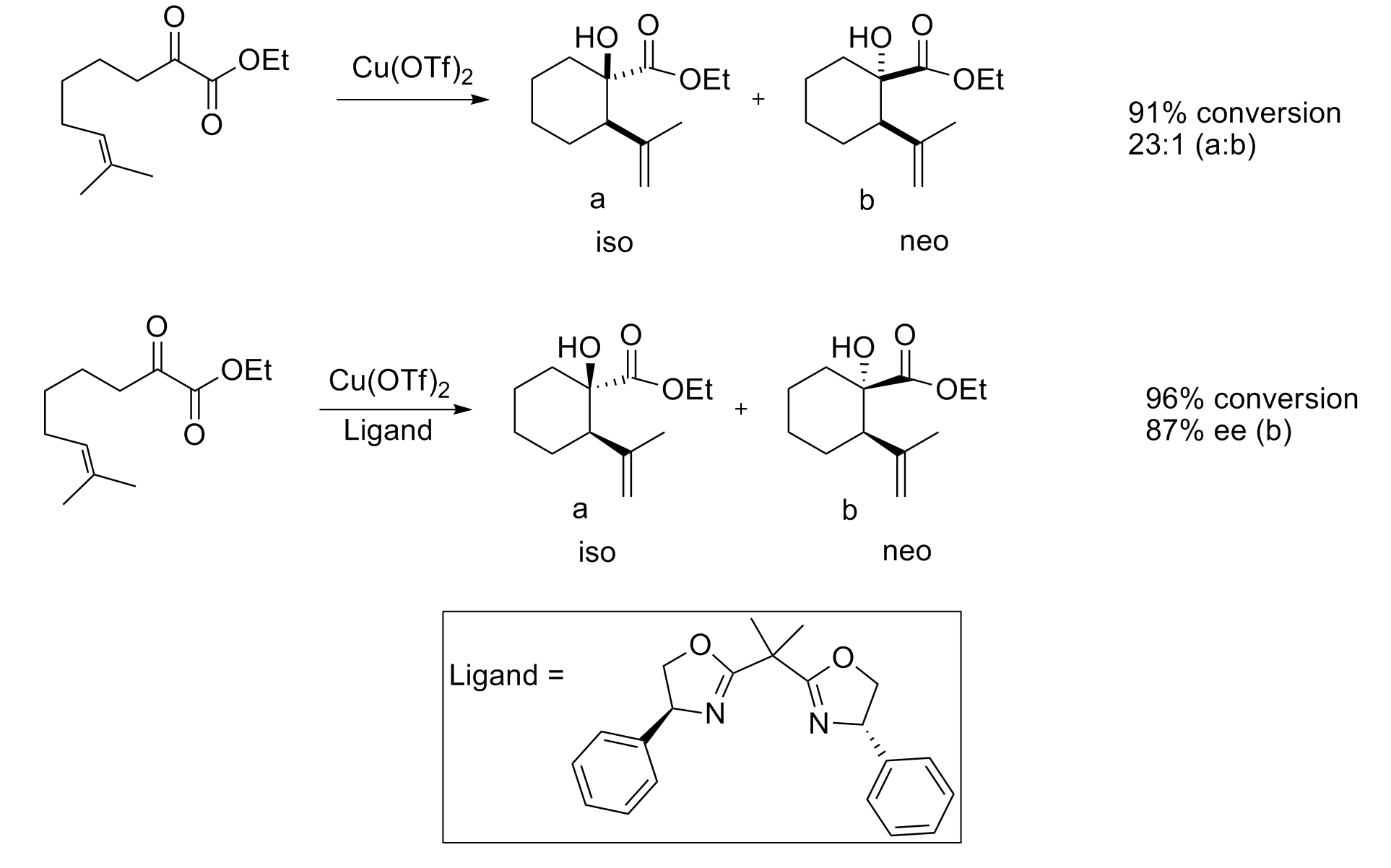

Good enantioselectivity has been observed when a chiral Lewis acid catalyst is used.

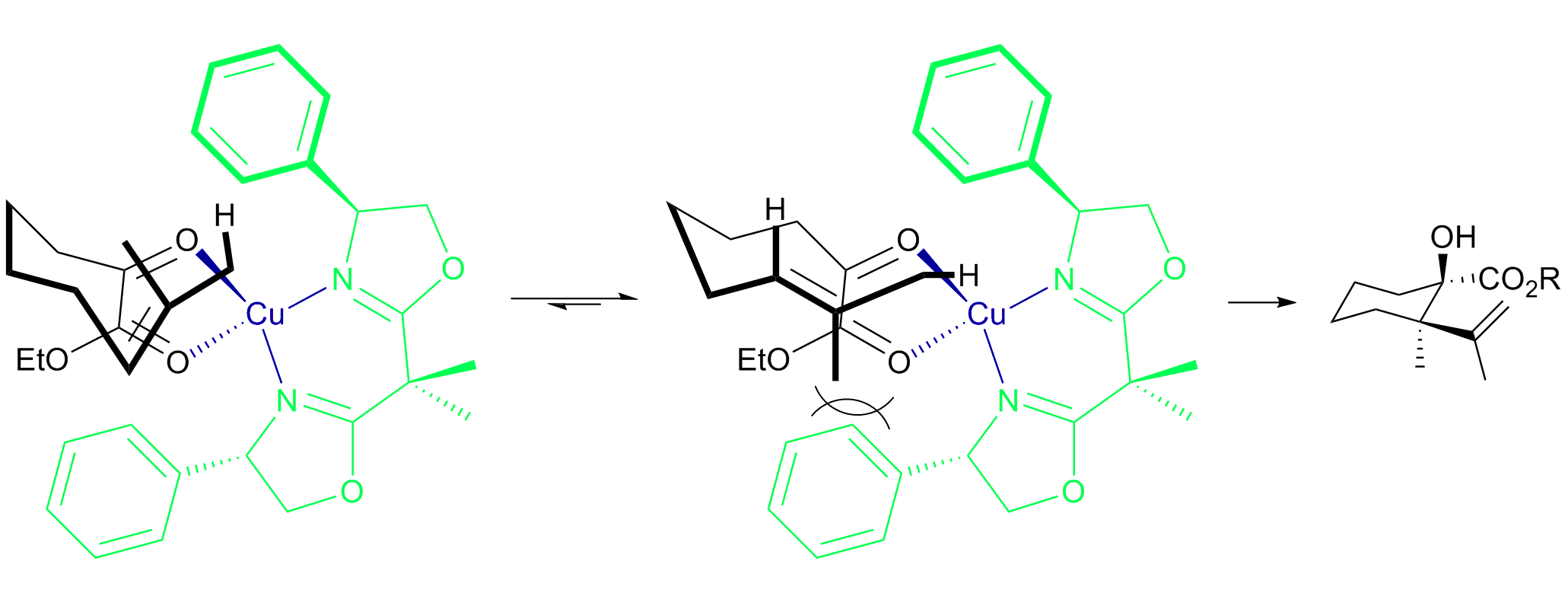

The enantioselectivity is believed to be due to the steric interactions between the methyl and phenyl group, which makes the transition structure of the iso product considerably more favorable.

== Achiral Lewis acids in stereoselective synthesis ==
In some cases, an achiral Lewis acid may provide good stereoselectivity. Kimura et al. demonstrated the regio- and diastereoselective coupling of 1,3-dienes with aldehydes using a nickel catalyst.
