= Alicyclic compound =

Organic molecule with one or more non-aromatic all-carbon rings

In organic chemistry, an alicyclic compound contains one or more all-carbon rings which may be either saturated or unsaturated, but do not have aromatic character. Alicyclic compounds may have one or more aliphatic side chains attached.

== Cycloalkanes ==
Cyclopropane is the smallest alicyclic compound.

The simplest alicyclic compounds are the monocyclic cycloalkanes: cyclopropane, cyclobutane, cyclopentane, cyclohexane, cycloheptane, cyclooctane, and so on. Bicyclic alkanes include decalin, housane, and norbornane. Polycyclic alkanes include cubane, basketane, and tetrahedrane.

Spiro compounds have two or more rings that are connected through only one carbon atom.

The mode of ring-closing in the formation of many alicyclic compounds can be predicted by Baldwin's rules.

Otto Wallach, a German chemist, received the 1910 Nobel Prize in Chemistry for his work on alicyclic compounds.

== Cycloalkenes ==
Cyclohexene is an alicyclic compound with a double bond.

Monocyclic cycloalkenes are cyclopropene, cyclobutene, cyclopentene, cyclohexene, cycloheptene, cyclooctene, and so on. Bicyclic alkenes include norbornene and norbornadiene.

Two more examples are shown below, methylenecyclohexane on the left and 1-methylcyclohexene on the right:

Left: exocyclic double bond Right: regular double bond

An exocyclic group is always shown outside the ring structure, take for instance the exocyclic double bond of the former molecule. Isotoluenes are a prominent class of compounds with exocyclic double bonds.

The placement of double bonds in many alicyclic compounds can be predicted with Bredt's rule.
