= 1-Methylcyclohexene =

Names
- Preferred IUPAC name 1-Methylcyclohex-1-ene
- Other names: 2,3,4,5-Tetrahydrotoluene; 1-Methyl-1-cyclohexene

Identifiers
CAS Number	591-49-1
3D model (JSmol)	Interactive image
Beilstein Reference	1304483
ChEBI	CHEBI:229299
ChemSpider	11086
ECHA InfoCard	100.008.836
EC Number	209-718-0
PubChem CID	11574
UNII	TE4P8Q2044
UN number	3295
CompTox Dashboard (EPA)	DTXSID3060451; DTXSID70862258; DTXSID10862257
- InChI: InChI=1S/C7H12/c1-7-5-3-2-4-6-7/h5H,2-4,6H2,1H3 Key: CTMHWPIWNRWQEG-UHFFFAOYSA-N
- SMILES: CC1=CCCCC1

Properties
Chemical formula	C_{7}H_{12}
Molar mass	96.173 g·mol^{−1}
Appearance	colorless liquid
Density	0.811 g/mL at 20 °C
Melting point	−120.4 °C (−184.7 °F; 152.8 K)
Boiling point	110 °C (230 °F; 383 K)
Solubility in water	0.052 g/kg for 1-methylcyclohexene
Refractive index (n_{D})	1.44

Hazards
- GHS labelling
Pictograms	(GHS02: Flammable) (GHS07: Exclamation mark) (GHS08: Health hazard)
Signal word	Warning
Hazard statements	H225, H304, H315, H319, H335
Precautionary statements	P210, P233, P240, P241, P242, P243, P261, P264, P271, P280, P301+P310, P302+P352, P303+P361+P353, P304+P340, P305+P351+P338, P312, P321, P331, P332+P313, P337+P313, P362, P370+P378, P403+P233, P403+P235, P405, P501
Flash point	−3 °C (27 °F; 270 K)
Safety data sheet (SDS)	MSDS (1-methylcyclohexene)
- Except where otherwise noted, data are given for materials in their standard state (at 25 °C [77 °F], 100 kPa). Infobox references

1-Methylcyclohexene is an organic compound consisting of cyclohexene with a methyl group substituent attached to the alkene group. Two other structural isomers are known: 3-methylcyclohexene and 4-methylcyclohexene. All are colorless volatile liquids. They are specialized reagents. Methylcyclohexenes are a cyclic olefins.

== Synthesis and reactions ==
Methylcyclohexenes are formed by the partial hydrogenation of toluene to methylcyclohexane over ruthenium catalyst.

Ozonolysis of 1-methylcyclohexene results in ring-opening.

== Stereochemical probe ==
1-Methylcyclohexene is used as a probe of the stereochemistry of reactions involving alkenes because it is prochiral and the two sp^{2}-carbon atoms differ.

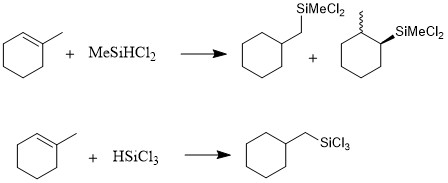
Hydrosilylation of 1-methylcyclohexene

The regioselectivity and stereoselectivity of hydrosilylation of 1-methylcyclohexene with chloro(methyl)silanes depends on the number of chlorine atoms in the hydrosilylating agent. Using chlorodimethylsilane produces a mixture of seven different products including cis- and trans-isomers of 2-, 3-, 4-chlorodimethyl(methylcyclohexyl)silanes and chlorodimethyl(cyclohexylmethyl)silane. The poor selectivity is due to the migration of the double bond in the cyclohexene ring. Reaction with dichloromethylsilane is more regioselective and stereoselective, only giving three of the seven products obtained from monochlorodimethylsilane. With trichloromethylsilane, trichlorocyclohexylmethylsilane is the only possible product and is obtained at 60 percent yield. All these products can be further reacted with Grignard reagents such as ethynylmagnesium bromide to synthesize ethynyl derivatives.

Oxidation of 1-methylcyclohexene catalyzed by cytochrome P450 yields a 2:1 mixture of hydroxylation to epoxidation products.

The stereochemistry of hydroformylation has been examined using 1-methylcyclohexene. The main product has the formyl group on the less substituted alkene-carbon, trans with respect to the methyl substituent.
