= (1R,3R)-1,2,3-Trimethylcyclopentane =

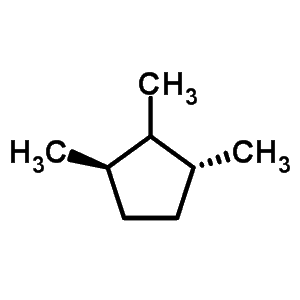

Names
- IUPAC name (1R,3R)-1,2,3-Trimethylcyclopentane
- Other names Cyclopentane, 1,2,3-trimethyl-, cis-1,2,trans-1,3- cis-1,2-trans-3-Trimethylcyclopentane; Cyclopentane,1,2,3-trimethyl-, (1a,2a,3b)-}}

Identifiers
CAS Number	15890-40-1
3D model (JSmol)	Interactive image
ChemSpider	25623
PubChem CID	27533
- InChI: InChI=1S/C8H16/c1-6-4-5-7(2)8(6)3/h6-8H,4-5H2,1-3H3/t6-,7-/m1/s1 Key: VCWNHOPGKQCXIQ-RNFRBKRXSA-N
- SMILES: C[C@@H]1CC[C@H](C1C)C

Properties
Chemical formula	C_{8}H_{16}
Molar mass	112.216 g·mol^{−1}
Melting point	−113 °C (−171 °F; 160 K)
Boiling point	118 °C (244 °F; 391 K)

Hazards
- Occupational safety and health (OHS/OSH)
Main hazards	prolonged exposure may result in cancer or health defects
Flash point	9.2 °C (48.6 °F; 282.3 K)
- Except where otherwise noted, data are given for materials in their standard state (at 25 °C [77 °F], 100 kPa). Infobox references

(1R,3R)-1,2,3-Trimethylcyclopentane is an organic hydrocarbon alicyclic cycloalkane compound with the molecular formula C_{8}H_{16}. It is a saturated cyclopentane with three methyl substituents branching off carbons 1,2, and 3. The methyl groups off carbons 1 and 3 are trans with respect to each other, while the methyl group off carbon 2 has undefined stereochemistry, allowing it to be either cis or trans with respect to methyl 1 or 3.

Each carbon atom within the cyclopentane ring is sp^{3} hybridized with the theoretical C-C-C bond angles near 108 degrees. Therefore ring strain is less prominent compared to other cycloalkanes as there is minimal deviation from the ideal tetrahedral bond angle, 109.5 degrees. However, in a planar molecule such as (1R,3R)-1,2,3-trimethylcyclopentane eclipsing interactions of adjacent C-H, adjacent methyl groups, and adjacent methyl groups & C-H bonds can contribute considerable strain. Therefore, the ring distorts slightly to adopt a minimum energy conformation that reduces the unfavorable eclipsing interactions. There are two puckered conformations exist for five-member ring systems. Such conformations include the envelope (IHIPOE, ACUHUB) and the half-chair (LISLOO, ABIKUR); please refer to figure at right. Little energy differences exist between each conformation, and it is not uncommon for five-membered ring systems such as (1R,3R)-1,2,3-trimethylcyclopentane to adopt a moderate conformation that lies somewhere between the two.

== Isomers ==
Various stereoisomers exist for (1R,3R)-1,2,3-trimethylcyclopentane. Because (1R,3R)-1,2,3-trimethylcyclopentane is a cycloalkane, its three methyl substituents are capable of exhibiting cis/trans isomerism. This implies that the methyl groups in positions 1,2, and 3 may occupy different spatial arrangements (i.e.they may either lay cis or trans with respect to each other). Such stereoisomers include: Cyclopentane, 1,2,3-trimethyl-,(1α,2β,3α)-, Cyclopentane, 1,2,3-trimethyl-,(1α,2α,3β)-, Cyclopentane, 1,2,3-trimethyl-, and 1,2(cis),3(trans)-trimethylcyclopentane.

== Occurrences ==
(1R,3R)-1,2,3-Trimethylcyclopentane has been identified by the United States Environmental Protection Agency in their Master List of Compounds Emitted by Mobile Sources as a component of mobile source air toxins that can be found in gasoline exhaust and liquefied petroleum gas (LPG) exhaust. Mobile source air toxins are compounds emitted from highway vehicle and non-road equipment via exhaust or evaporative emissions that are known or suspected to cause cancer or other serious health or environmental defects. Non-cancer health defects that may result from prolonged exposure to mobile source air toxins include: neurological, cardiovascular, liver, kidney, and respiratory effects as well as adverse effects on the immune and reproductive systems. Mobile sources are responsible for direct emissions of air toxins and contribute to precursor emissions which react to form secondary pollutants.
