= Toluene (data page) =

Chemical data page

This page provides supplementary chemical data on toluene.

== Structure and properties ==
Structure and properties
Index of refraction, n_{D}
1.4969 at 20 °C
Abbe number
?
Dielectric constant, ε_{r}
2.379 ε_{0} at 25 °C
Bond strength
?
Bond length
?
Bond angle
?
Magnetic susceptibility
?
Surface tension
28.52 dyn/cm at 25 °C
Viscosity

1.1813 mPa·s	at −25 °C
1.0787 mPa·s	at −20 °C
0.9888 mPa·s	at −15 °C
0.9095 mPa·s	at −10 °C
0.8393 mPa·s	at −5 °C
0.7770 mPa·s	at 0 °C
0.7214 mPa·s	at 5 °C
0.6717 mPa·s	at 10 °C
0.6270 mPa·s	at 15 °C
0.5867 mPa·s	at 20 °C
0.5503 mPa·s	at 25 °C
0.5173 mPa·s	at 30 °C
0.4873 mPa·s	at 35 °C
0.4599 mPa·s	at 40 °C
0.4349 mPa·s	at 45 °C
0.4120 mPa·s	at 50 °C

== Thermodynamic properties ==
Phase behavior
Triple point	178.15 K (−94.99 °C), ? Pa
Critical point	591.79 K (318.64 °C), 4.109 MPa
Std enthalpy change of fusionΔ_{fus}H^{~~o~~}	6.636 kJ/mol
Std entropy change of fusionΔ_{fus}S^{~~o~~}	37.25 J/(mol·K)
Std enthalpy change of vaporizationΔ_{vap}H^{~~o~~}	38.06 kJ/mol
Std entropy change of vaporizationΔ_{vap}S^{~~o~~}	87.30 J/(mol·K)
Solid properties
Std enthalpy change of formation Δ_{f}H^{~~o~~}_{solid}	? kJ/mol
Standard molar entropy S^{~~o~~}_{solid}	? J/(mol K)
Heat capacity c_{p} _{liquid}	181,2 J/(mol K)
Heat capacity c_{p} _{gas}	103,6 J/(mol K)
Liquid properties
Std enthalpy change of formation Δ_{f}H^{~~o~~}_{liquid}	+12.0 kJ/mol
Standard molar entropy S^{~~o~~}_{liquid}	220.96 J/(mol K)
Heat capacity c_{p}	155.96 J/(mol K)
Gas properties
Std enthalpy change of formation Δ_{f}H^{~~o~~}_{gas}	+50.00 kJ/mol
Standard molar entropy S^{~~o~~}_{gas}	? J/(mol K)
Heat capacity c_{p}	103.7 J/(mol K)
van der Waals' constants	a = 2438 L^{2} kPa/mol^{2} b = 0.1463 liter per mole

== Vapor pressure of liquid ==
P in mm Hg	1	10	40	100	400	760	1520	3800	7600	15200	30400	45600
T in °C	−25	6.4	35	42

== Spectral data ==
UV-Vis
Spectrum	NIST
Lambda-max	253, 259, 261, 268nm
Log Ε	2.36, 2.42, 2.43, 2.27
IR
Spectrum	NIST
Major absorption bands	3028, 1605, 1496, 729, 696 cm^{−1}
NMR
Proton NMR	(CDCl_{3}, 300 MHz) δ 7.17–7.11 (m, 2H), 7.08–7.01 (m, 3H), 2.32 (s, 3H)
Carbon-13 NMR	(CDCl_{3}, 100 MHz) δ 137.7, 128.7, 127.9, 125.0, 20.8
Other NMR data	?
MS
Masses of main fragments	?

This box:
- Except where noted otherwise, data relate to Standard temperature and pressure.
- Reliability of data general note.
