= Methylcyclohexene =

Methylcyclohexene can refer to any of three compounds:

- 1-Methylcyclohexene
- 3-Methylcyclohexene
- 4-Methylcyclohexene
