= Isotoluene =

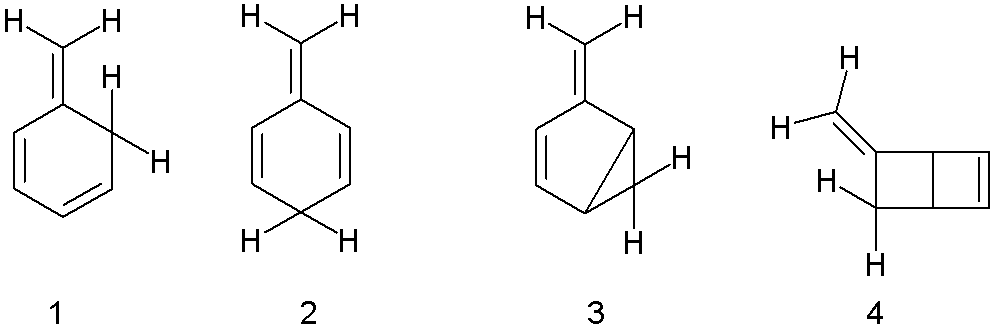
The isotoluenes

The isotoluenes in organic chemistry are the non-aromatic toluene isomers with an exocyclic double bond. They are of some academic interest in relation to aromaticity and isomerisation mechanisms.

The three basic isotoluenes are ortho-isotoluene or 5-methylene-1,3-cyclohexadiene (here labelled 1); para-isotoluene (2); and meta-isotoluene (3). Another structural isomer is the bicyclic compound 5-methylenebicyclo[2.2.0] hexene (4).

The o- and p-isotoluenes isomerise to toluene, a reaction driven by aromatic stabilisation. It is estimated that these compounds are 96 kJ mol^{−1} less stable.

The isomerisation of p-isotoluene to toluene takes place at 100 °C in benzene with bimolecular reaction kinetics by an intermolecular free radical reaction. The intramolecular isomerisation, a 1,3-sigmatropic reaction, is unfavorable because an antarafacial mode is enforced. Other dimer radical reaction products are formed as well.

The ortho-isomer is found to isomerise at 60 °C in benzene, also in a second order reaction. The proposed reaction mechanism is a concerted intermolecular ene reaction. The reaction product is either toluene or a mixture of dimerized ene reaction products, depending on the exact reaction conditions.

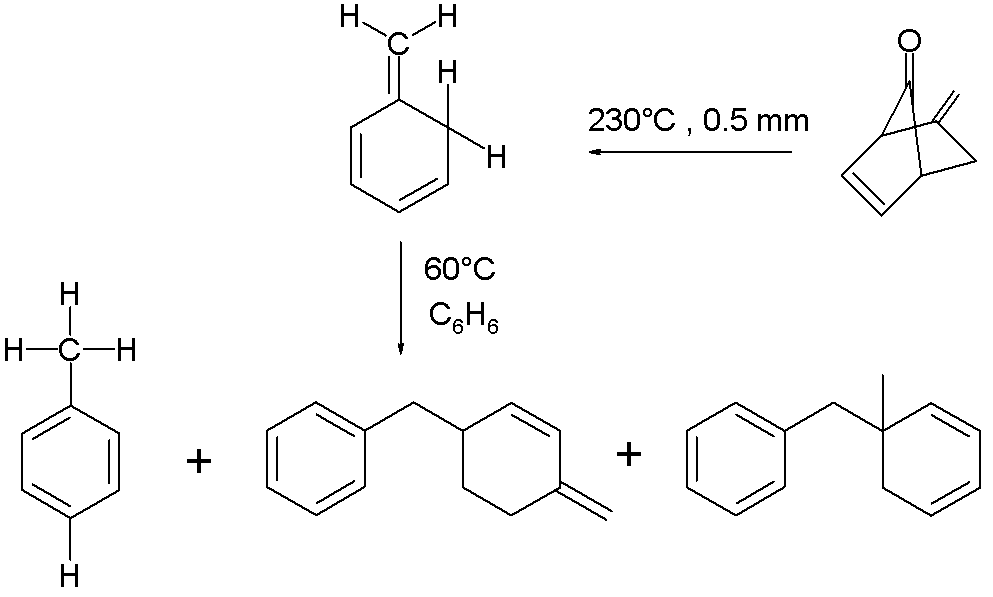
ortho-isotoluene synthesis and reactions

Ortho-isotoluene has been researched in connection with the mechanism of initiator-free polymerization of polystyrene.

== See also ==
- Pentacene
