= Conia-ene reaction =

Chemical reaction

Named after	Jean-Marie Conia
Reaction type	Group transfer

Identifiers
Organic Chemistry Portal	conia-ene-reaction

In organic chemistry, the Conia-ene reaction is an intramolecular cyclization reaction between an enolizable carbonyl such as an ester or ketone and an alkyne or alkene, giving a cyclic product with a new carbon-carbon bond. As initially reported by J. M. Conia and P. Le Perchec, the Conia-ene reaction is a heteroatom analog of the ene reaction that uses an enol as the ene component. Like other pericyclic reactions, the original Conia-ene reaction required high temperatures to proceed, limiting its wider application. However, subsequent improvements, particularly in metal catalysis, have led to significant expansion of reaction scope. Consequently, various forms of the Conia-ene reaction have been employed in the synthesis of complex molecules and natural products.

== History and mechanism ==
In the late 1960s, the laboratory of chemist Jean-Marie Conia investigated small carbocyclic molecules, specifically as products of ene-type reactions with carbonyls. These efforts culminated in a 1975 review paper titled “The Thermal Cyclisation of Unsaturated Carbonyl Compounds.”

In its original manifestation, the Conia-ene reaction comprised the intramolecular cyclization of ε,ζ-unsaturated ketones or aldehydes to functionalized cyclopentanes upon intense heating. The proposed mechanism invoked a six-membered, ene reaction-like transition state in which the enol tautomer reacts concertedly with the pendant alkene.

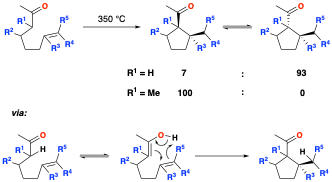

The same conditions were found to give six- and nine-membered rings with the appropriate substrates, although with lower yields and diastereoselectivity. In the case of γ,δ- and δ,ε-unsaturated ketones, equilibrium favored the linear product over the cyclopropane or cyclobutane. Alkynyl ketones were also found to cyclize under thermal conditions, giving a mixture of the conjugated and skipped cyclic enones.

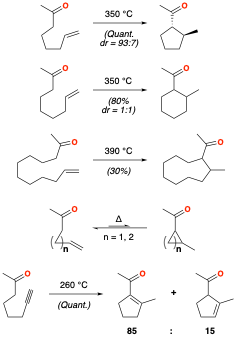

Two key drawbacks prevented wider implementation of the initial Conia-ene reaction. First, molecules with additional functional groups were often incompatible with the high temperatures required for conversion. Second, regio- and diastereoselectivity depended entirely on the substrate, offering little to no control over the orientation of the product.

== Advancements ==
In the decades after the discovery of the Conia-ene reaction, several improvements allowed for milder reaction conditions and greater control of product stereo- and regiochemistry. For example, the carbonyl component, formerly a ketone or aldehyde, became a substituted β-ketoester or malonate ester. Such carbonyls enolize much more readily, yielding better access to the desired enol tautomer. Additionally, the alkene component was replaced with an alkyne, which not only gave better cyclization in accordance with Baldwin’s rules, but also furnished a product containing an alkene that served as a useful handle for further transformations. Finally, recent efforts have featured metal-mediated and metal-catalyzed Conia-ene reactions that can be rendered asymmetric using chiral ligands.

== Activation modes ==
These advancements have produced five main types of Conia-ene reactions characterized by the operative activation mode: namely, enolate, alkyne, or ene-yne activation, and one- or two-metal dual activation. Note that though the mechanisms of Conia-ene variants differ from the initial ene-like cyclization, they are still considered Conia-ene or Conia-ene-type reactions. In addition, due to the complexity of some Conia-ene reaction systems, the true mechanism may lay somewhere between several different activation modes.

=== Enolate activation ===
Enolate activation is the simplest Conia-ene activation mode. In this mode, the carbonyl starting material is treated with a strong base, such as nBuLi, NaH, or tBuOK, to form a metal-stabilized enolate, which then attacks the tethered alkyne and transfers the metal cation. An early example of enolate activation was reported by Taguchi and coworkers in 1999. The authors found that in the presence of catalytic base, alkynyl-substituted malonate esters undergo facile cyclization to the corresponding cyclopentanes. High yields were also obtained with substituted cyanoacetate, sulfonylacetate, and phosphonoacetate analogs.

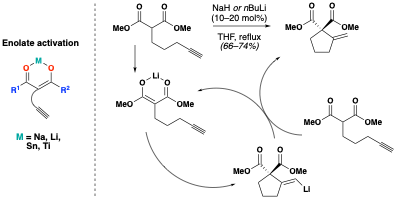

=== Alkyne activation ===
In Conia-ene reactions proceeding via alkyne activation, a suitable late transition metal (Au, Ag, Pt, Pd) coordinates to the alkyne and increases its electrophilicity; thus, the enol tautomer of the carbonyl can attack more readily. Toste et al. pioneered two of the first examples of alkyne activation in 2004. Using a cationic Au(I) complex, the authors formed a wide variety of cyclized products from linear β-ketoester starting materials. Notably, the reactions are run under mild conditions and give high diastereoselectivity. Moreover, by shortening the alkyne tether from three carbons to two, substituted cyclopentenes can also be accessed.

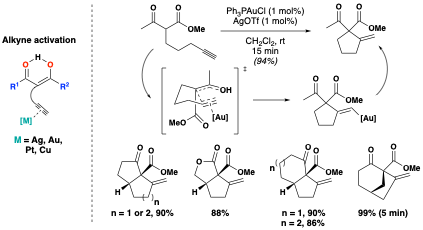

=== Ene-yne activation ===
In ene-yne activation, the least common of the five modes, a single metal species coordinates with the enol alkene and the tethered alkyne, simultaneously activating both moieties for reaction. Nickel, cobalt, and rhenium complexes have all been employed in this manner. A representative example was reported by Malacria et al. in 1994, in which an alkynyl substituted β-ketoester was treated with cyclopentadienyl cobalt complex and irradiation to give disubstituted methylene cyclopentane.

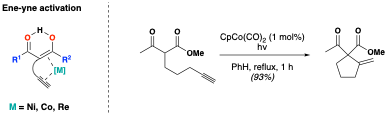

=== One-metal dual activation ===
To effect dual activation by a single metal, the same metal species that activates the enolate also interacts with the alkyne. Though the precise mechanisms are poorly understood and likely vary from case to case, metals such as In, Zn, Fe, and Cu are proposed to operate via this mode. One reaction system thought to proceed via one-metal dual activation is that developed by Shaw et al. in 2014. Using a catalytic Fe(III)-(Salen) complex, Shaw and coworkers were able to access chiral cyclopentanes from an array of alkynyl-tethered β-ketoesters and analogs thereof. The reaction tolerated a wide range of ketones (phenyl, homoallyl, cyclopropyl, 2-furyl, etc.), esters (ethyl, tert-butyl, etc.), and ester analogs (nitro, phosphono, cyano, sulfonyl, etc.).

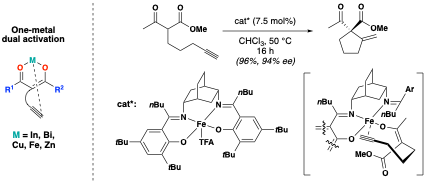

=== Two-metal dual activation ===
Two-metal dual activation represents the combination of the enolate activation mode and the alkyne activation mode into a single reaction system. Generally, a hard, oxophilic metal (K, Na, Ag) activates the enolate oxygen, while a soft, carbophilic metal (Pd, Cu, Mo) coordinates with the alkyne. In some instances, however, the precise role of each metal is unclear. For example, in a 2005 study Toste et al. found that treatment of an alkynyl-tethered β-ketoester with a Pd(II) phosphine complex and Yb(OTf)_{3} effected asymmetric cyclization to the corresponding cyclopentane. It is proposed that a Pd-enolate adds into a Yb-activated alkyne, though there is also precedent for Pd activation of alkynes.

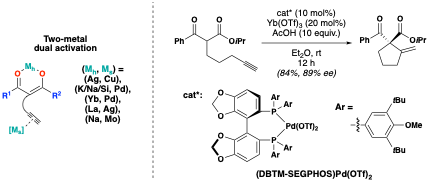

== Applications in total synthesis ==
Following their development of Au-catalyzed Conia-ene reactions, Toste and coworkers employed such a transformation toward the alkaloid natural product lycopladine A. Starting from chiral cyclohexenone 1, a series of enone functionalizations gave silyl enol ether 2 as the Conia-ene precursor. To effect cyclization, 2 was treated with catalytic AuCl(PPh_{3}) and AgBF_{4} to furnish vinyl iodide 3 in high yield as a single diastereomer. The remainder of the molecule was completed in three steps to give (+)-lycopladine A in eight steps and 17% overall yield.

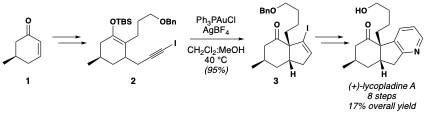

In 2012, Carreira et al. synthesized racemic gomerone C, a halogenated terpene isolated from the red algae Laurencia majuscula, and employed Au-catalyzed Conia-ene cyclization as the penultimate step. Having obtained silyl enol ether 7 in 11 steps from bicycle 6, itself the product of a Diels–Alder cycloaddition between siloxydiene 4 and enone 5, the authors subject 7 to 50 mol% Echavarren’s catalyst to deliver tricycle 8 in 65% yield. This compound is then elaborated to (±)-gomerone C by chlorination of the exo-methylene.

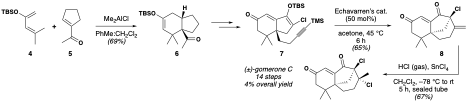

In 2020, Yang and coworkers employed a diastereoselective Conia-ene reaction during their asymmetric synthesis of (+)-waihoensene, a structurally dense terpenoid from Podocarpus totara var. waihoensis, first synthesized by the Lee group in 2017. Vinylogous ester 9 was first functionalized in six steps to chiral Conia-ene precursor 10. Subsequent treatment of 10 with tBuOK in DMSO gave bicycle 11 in 83% yield as a single diastereomer. This compound then required eight additional transformations to reach (+)-waihoensene in 15 steps and 4% overall yield.
