= Ene reaction =

Reaction in organic chemistry

In organic chemistry, the ene reaction (also known as the Alder-ene reaction by its discoverer Kurt Alder in 1943) is a chemical reaction between a relatively electron-rich allyl group (the ene) and an electron-poor π bond (the enophile). The reaction is a pericyclic group transfer; the enophile attacks to the ene to form a new σ bond with an allylic rearrangement and concomitant hydrogen migration:

Figure 1 - the ene reaction

The reaction resembles the Diels–Alder cyclization, with similar activating groups and transition geometries, but is much less spontaneous. It usually requires highly activated substrates, high temperatures, or a catalytic Lewis acid. Nevertheless, it has excellent functional group tolerance.

== Components ==
As is typical, intramolecular ene reactions proceed more facilely than the corresponding intermolecular reactions, because they have less negative entropies of activation. They occur even in the case of simple enophiles, such as unactivated alkenes and alkynes.

=== Ene ===
Enes are π-bonded molecules that contain at least one hydrogen atom at the allylic or propargylic position. Possible enes may be olefinic, acetylenic, allenic, aromatic, cyclopropyl, and certain carbon-heteroatom bonds. Strained enes and fused small ring systems undergo ene reactions at much lower temperatures. Conversely, arenes can act as an ene but require high temperatures; for example phenol reacts with dihydropyran at 150–170 °C (302–338 °F).

Heteroenes containing C=O, C=N and C=S bonds have been reported, but are rare. Contrariwise, enolates and similar species are common enes: their reactions are the Conia-ene reaction and its descendants.

Usually, the allylic hydrogen atoms of allenic components participate in ene reactions, but in the case of allenyl silanes, the allenic hydrogen atom α to the silicon substituent is the one transferred, affording a silylalkyne.

=== Enophile ===
Enophiles are typically electrophilic olefins and good dienophiles, but many π-bonded molecules with electron-withdrawing substituents participate. In addition to carbon-carbon multiple bonds (olefins, acetylenes), enophiles may contain carbon-hetero multiple bonds (C=O in the case of carbonyl-ene reactions, C=N, C=S, C≡P), hetero-hetero multiple bonds (N=N, O=O, Si=Si, N=O, S=O), cumulene systems (N=S=O, N=S=N, N=Se=N, C=C=O, C=C=S, SO_{2}) and charged π systems (C=N^{+}, C=S^{+}, C≡O^{+}, C≡N^{+}).

All-carbon ene reactions have, in general, a high activation barrier. Propylene + ethylene has a barrier of 138 kJ/mol (1.4 eV/instance). This barrier decreases substantially as the transition state becomes more polar; computations with the M06-2X functional and a def2-TZVPP basis set determine a barrier of 61.5 kJ/mol (0.6 eV/instance) for propylene + thioformaldehyde. More generally, they suggest that enophiles decrease the barrier in the order:

H_{2}C=CH_{2} > H_{2}C=NH > H_{2}C=CH(COOCH_{3}) > H_{2}C=O > H_{2}C=PH > H_{2}C=S

Complexation of the enophile to a Lewis acid also accelerates the ene reaction:

Improvements brought to the ene reaction by Lewis acid catalysis

== Mechanism ==
Orbital interactions relevant to the concerted mechanism for the ene reaction

The HOMO of the ene and the LUMO of the enophile comprise the main frontier orbital interaction in an ene reaction. The ene HOMO combines the vinyl π bond and the allylic C-H bond. The enophile LUMO has substantial π* character.

Like the Diels-Alder reaction, the ene reaction is often called a concerted reaction; it is designated [_{σ}2_{s} + _{π}2_{s} + _{π}2_{s}] in the Woodward-Hoffmann notation. Certainly, relatively nonpolar substrates react concertedly (but with a high activation barrier). Some computations suggest that more polar substrates have a lower activation barrier because the reaction mechanism transitions to an asynchronous, stepwise addition with ionic intermediates. On the other hand, the universally concerted nature of the ene process has both experimental and computational support.

=== Regioselectivity ===
The success of an ene reaction is largely determined by the steric accessibility of the allylic ene hydrogen. The abstracted H atom's order of thermal ene reactivity is irrespective of the product's thermodynamic stability and runs primary>secondary>tertiary. This preference can reverse with Lewis-acid-promoted reactions, which sometimes develop a large partial positive charge on an internal ene carbon during the reaction, requiring hyperconjugative stabilization.

The orientation of ene addition can be predicted from the relative stabilization of the developing partial charges in an unsymmetrical transition state with early formation of the σ bond. The major regioisomer will come from the transition state in which transient charges are best stabilized by the orientation of the ene and enophile.

=== Asymmetric induction ===
The ene reaction has a weak preference for an endo transition state, easily overridden by other steric interactions:

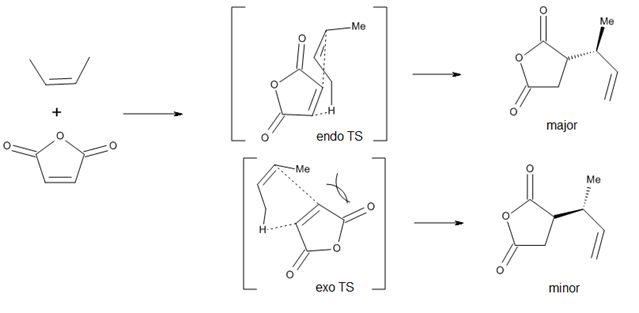
Endo preference for the ene reaction

The shape of the six-membered transition state is determined by 1,3-diaxial and 1,2-diequatorial repulsions:

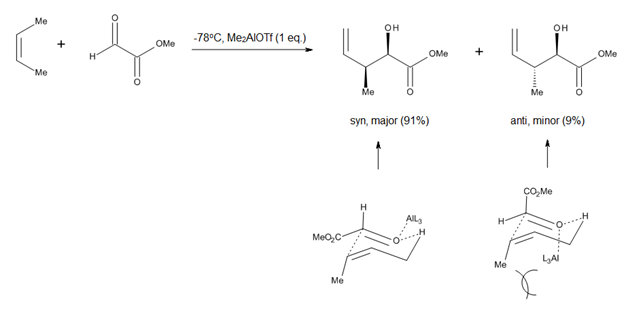

== Lewis acid catalysis ==
Thermal ene reactions have several drawbacks, such as the need for very high temperatures and the possibility of side reactions, like proton-catalyzed olefin polymerization or isomerization reactions. Alkylaluminum halides are well known as proton scavengers, and their use as Lewis acid catalysts in ene reactions has greatly expanded the scope of these reactions and has allowed their study and development under significantly milder conditions.

Since a Lewis acid can directly complex to a carbonyl oxygen, numerous trialkylaluminum catalysts have been developed for carbonyl-activated enophiles. In particular, Me_{2}AlCl is a very useful catalyst because the methanide ligands can scavenge protons to afford methane and aluminum alkoxide:

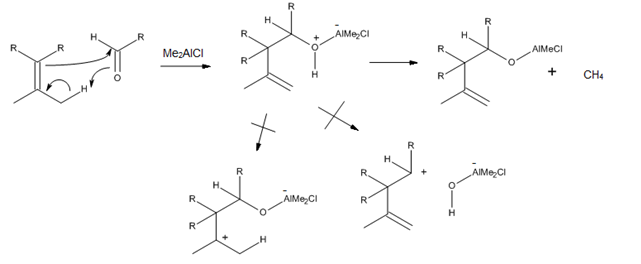
Me_{2}AlCl-catalyzed carbonyl-ene reactions

The addition of a Lewis acid can allow sufficiently low temperatures that the enantiomeric preferences of the transition state effect a single regioisomer:

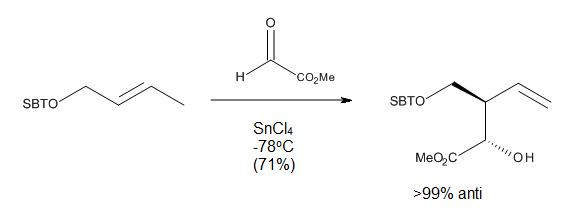
Lewis acid catalyzed, directed carbonyl-ene reaction.

=== Chiral Lewis acids ===
Mikami has reported the use of a chiral titanium complex, prepared in situ from (i-PrO)_{2}TiX_{2} and optically pure binaphthol, in an asymmetric ene reaction:

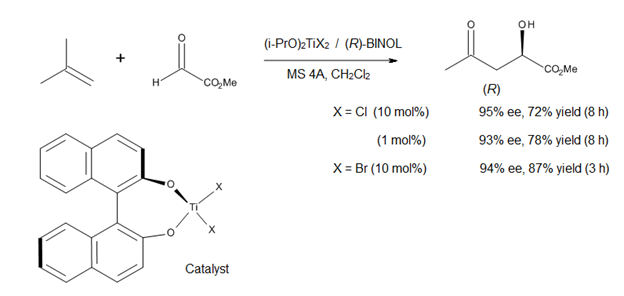
Asymmetric glyoxylate-ene reaction catalyzed by a chiral titanium complex

However, this method is only applicable to 1,1-disubstituted olefins, due to the modest Lewis acidity of the titanium-BINOL complex. Corey and co-workers explain the high enantioselectivity observed with an early transition state for this reaction: the aldehyde, activated by complexation, forms a pentacoordinate Ti structure. Formyl CH—O hydrogen bonding occurs to the stereoelectronically most favorable oxygen lone pair of the BINOL ligand. In such a structure, the top (re) face of the formyl group is much more accessible to a nucleophile attack, as the bottom (si) face is shielded by the neighboring naphthol moiety.

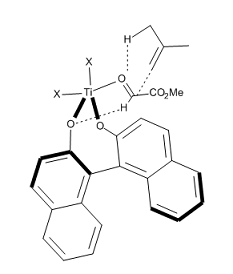
Transition state proposed for the reaction

Evans and co-workers have proposed a new type of enantioselective C2-symmetric Cu(II) catalysts to which substrates can chelate through two carbonyl groups:

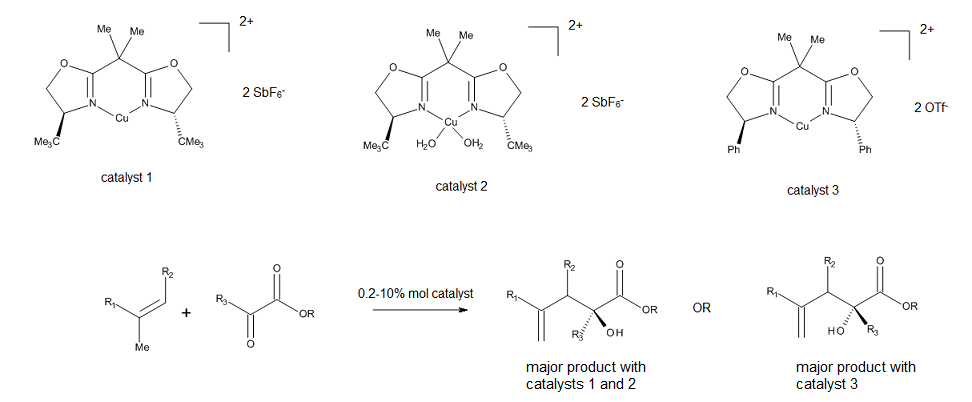
C2-symmetric Cu(II) catalysts developed for the enantioselective carbonyl-ene reactions of olefins and ethyl glyoxylate. Catalyst 2, in particular, is bench-stable and can be stored indefinitely

The reaction has a wide scope, owing to the high Lewis acidity of the catalysts, which can activate even weakly nucleophilic olefins, such as 1-hexene and cyclohexene:

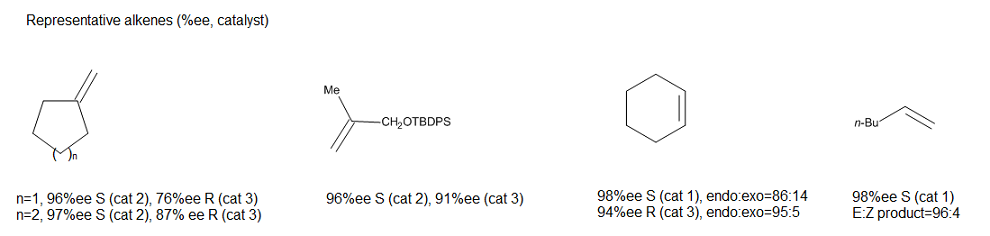
Scope of the reaction catalyzed by C2-symmetric Cu(II) chiral Lewis acids

The catalysts were found to afford high levels of asymmetric induction in several processes, including the ene reaction of ethyl glyoxylate with different unactivated olefins. For catalysts 1 and 2, the asymmetric induction is believed to result from the formation of a square-planar catalyst-glyoxylate complex. The aldehyde's re face is blocked by the tert-butyl substituents, thus allowing incoming olefins to attack only the si face. In catalyst 3, the enantiomeric preference is reversed; this is believed to occur because the metal center becomes tetrahedral:

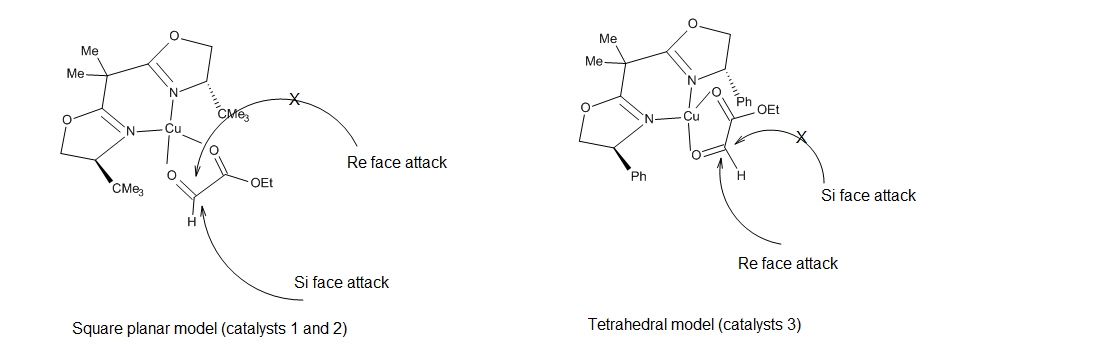
Square planar and tetrahedral Cu (II) stereochemical models.

== Commercial applications ==
Isoprene is produced commercially in two steps from isobutylene, starting with its ene reaction with formaldehyde. Dehydration of the resulting isopentenol gives isoprene:

== Reverse reaction ==
The reverse process, a retro-ene reaction, has been observed in the extrusion of thermodynamically stable molecules like carbon dioxide or dinitrogen. For instance, kinetic data and computational studies indicate that thermolysis of but-3-enoic acid to give propene and carbon dioxide proceeds via a retro-ene mechanism. Similarly, propargylic diazenes decompose readily through a retro-ene mechanism to give allene products and nitrogen gas (see Myers allene synthesis).

== See also ==
- Diels-Alder reaction
- Thiol-ene reaction
- -ene
- Certain isotoluenes isomerize by an ene mechanism
