= Heptyne =

Heptynes are alkynes with one triple bond and the molecular formula C_{7}H_{12}.

The isomers are:

- 1-Heptyne
- 2-Heptyne
- 3-Heptyne
