= Methylenecyclohexane =

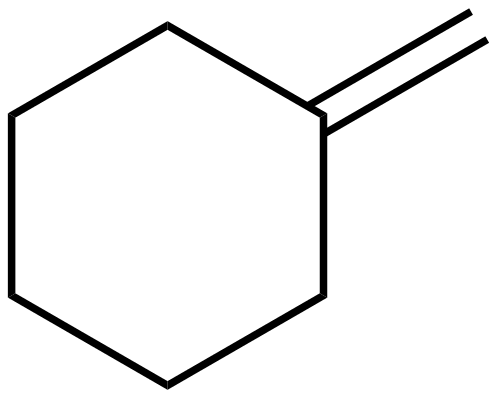

Names
- Preferred IUPAC name Methylidenecyclohexane
- Other names Methylenecyclohexane

Identifiers
CAS Number	1192-37-6
3D model (JSmol)	Interactive image
ChemSpider	13846
ECHA InfoCard	100.013.412
EC Number	214-752-4
PubChem CID	14502
UNII	ET4NT9H9LB
CompTox Dashboard (EPA)	DTXSID4061595
- InChI: InChI=1S/C7H12/c1-7-5-3-2-4-6-7/h1-6H2 Key: YULMNMJFAZWLLN-UHFFFAOYSA-N; InChI=1/C7H12/c1-7-5-3-2-4-6-7/h1-6H2 Key: YULMNMJFAZWLLN-UHFFFAOYAJ
- SMILES: C=C1CCCCC1

Properties
Chemical formula	C_{7}H_{12}
Molar mass	96.170 g/mol
Boiling point	102 to 103 °C (216 to 217 °F; 375 to 376 K)
- Except where otherwise noted, data are given for materials in their standard state (at 25 °C [77 °F], 100 kPa). verify (what is ?) Infobox references

Methylenecyclohexane (IUPAC name: methylidenecyclohexane) is an organic compound with the molecular formula C_{7}H_{12}.

== Synthesis ==
It can be produced by a Wittig reaction or a reaction with a Tebbe's reagent from cyclohexanone. It can also be synthesized as a side product of the dehydration of 2-methylcyclohexanol into 1-methylcyclohexene.

== Structure ==
Methylenecyclohexane is an unsaturated hydrocarbon, containing a cyclohexane ring with a methylene (methylidine) group attached.

== See also ==
- Methylcyclohexane
- Methylenecyclopropane
