= Lewis acids and bases =

Chemical bond theory

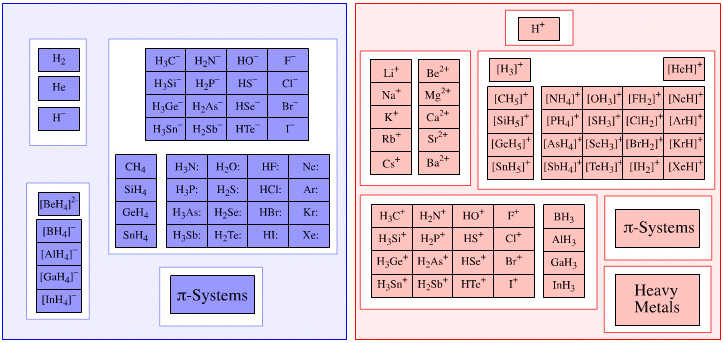
Diagram of some Lewis bases (left) and acids (right)

A Lewis acid is a chemical species that contains an empty orbital which is capable of accepting an electron pair from a Lewis base to form a Lewis adduct. A Lewis base, then, is any species that has a filled orbital containing an electron pair which is not involved in bonding but may form a dative bond with a Lewis acid to form a Lewis adduct. For example, NH_{3} is a Lewis base, because it can donate its lone pair of electrons. Trimethylborane [(CH_{3})_{3}B or Me_{3}B] is a Lewis acid, as it is capable of accepting a lone pair. In a Lewis adduct, the Lewis acid and base share an electron pair furnished by the Lewis base, forming a dative bond. In the context of a specific chemical reaction between NH_{3} and Me_{3}B, a lone pair from NH_{3} will form a dative bond with the empty orbital of Me_{3}B to form an adduct NH_{3}•BMe_{3}.

Lewis acids and bases are named for the American physical chemist Gilbert N. Lewis.

The terms nucleophile and electrophile are sometimes interchangeable with Lewis base and Lewis acid, respectively. These terms, especially their abstract noun forms nucleophilicity and electrophilicity, emphasize the kinetic aspect of reactivity, while the Lewis basicity and Lewis acidity emphasize the thermodynamic aspect of Lewis adduct formation.

== Depicting adducts ==
In many cases, the interaction between the Lewis base and Lewis acid in a complex is indicated by an arrow indicating the Lewis base donating electrons toward the Lewis acid using the notation of a dative bond—for example, Me_{3}B←NH_{3}. Some sources indicate the Lewis base with a pair of dots (the explicit electrons being donated), which allows consistent representation of the transition from the base itself to the complex with the acid:

Me_{3}B + :NH_{3} → Me_{3}B:NH_{3}

A center dot may also be used to represent a Lewis adduct, such as Me_{3}B·NH_{3}. Another example is boron trifluoride diethyl etherate, BF_{3}·Et_{2}O. In a slightly different usage, the center dot is also used to represent hydrate coordination in various crystals, as in MgSO_{4}·7H_{2}O for hydrated magnesium sulfate, irrespective of whether the water forms a dative bond with the metal.

Although there have been attempts to use computational and experimental energetic criteria to distinguish dative bonding from non-dative covalent bonds, for the most part, the distinction merely makes note of the source of the electron pair, and dative bonds, once formed, behave simply as other covalent bonds do, though they typically have considerable polar character. Moreover, in some cases (e.g., sulfoxides and amine oxides as R_{2}S → O and R_{3}N → O), the use of the dative bond arrow is just a notational convenience for avoiding the drawing of formal charges. In general, however, the donor–acceptor bond is viewed as simply somewhere along a continuum between idealized covalent bonding and ionic bonding.

== Lewis acids ==
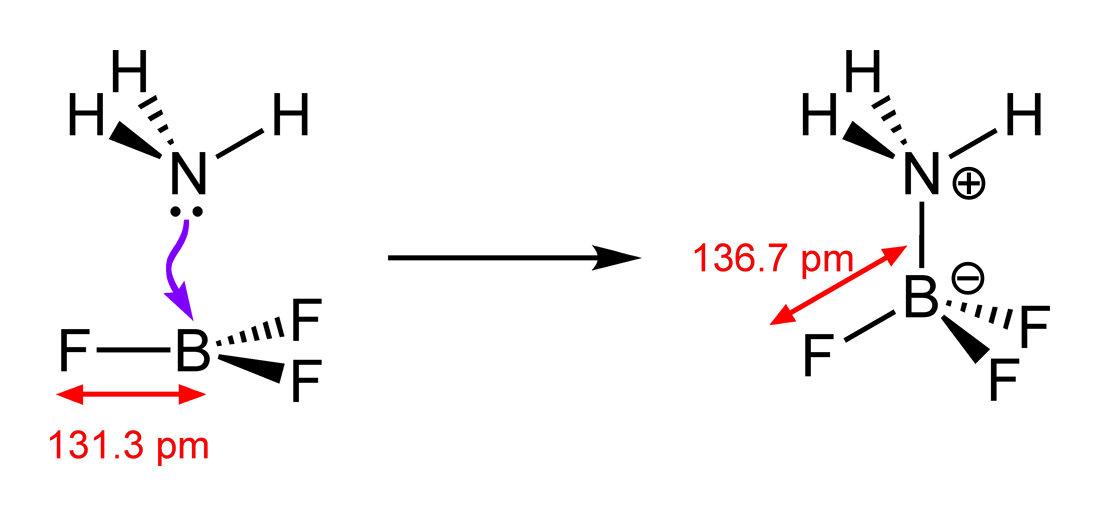
Major structural changes accompany binding of the Lewis base to the coordinatively unsaturated, planar Lewis acid BF_{3}

Lewis acids are diverse and the term is used loosely. Simplest are those that react directly with the Lewis base, such as boron trihalides and the pentahalides of phosphorus, arsenic, and antimony.

In the same vein, CH^{+}_{3} can be considered to be the Lewis acid in methylation reactions. However, the methyl cation never occurs as a free species in the condensed phase, and methylation reactions by reagents like CH_{3}I take place through the simultaneous formation of a bond from the nucleophile to the carbon and cleavage of the bond between carbon and iodine (S_{N}2 reaction). Textbooks disagree on this point: some asserting that alkyl halides are electrophiles but not Lewis acids, while others describe alkyl halides (e.g. CH_{3}Br) as a type of Lewis acid. The IUPAC states that Lewis acids and Lewis bases react to form Lewis adducts, and defines electrophile as Lewis acids.

=== Simple Lewis acids ===
Some of the most studied examples of such Lewis acids are the boron trihalides and organoboranes:

BF_{3} + F^{−} → BF^{−}_{4}

In this adduct, all four fluoride centres (or more accurately, ligands) are equivalent.

BF_{3} + OMe_{2} → BF_{3}OMe_{2}

Both BF_{4}^{−} and BF_{3}OMe_{2} are Lewis base adducts of boron trifluoride.

Many adducts violate the octet rule, such as the triiodide anion:

I_{2} + I^{−} → I^{−}_{3}

The variability of the colors of iodine solutions reflects the variable abilities of the solvent to form adducts with the Lewis acid I_{2}.

Some Lewis acids bind with two Lewis bases, a famous example being the formation of hexafluorosilicate:

SiF_{4} + 2 F^{−} → SiF^{2−}_{6}

=== Complex Lewis acids ===
Most compounds considered to be Lewis acids require an activation step prior to formation of the adduct with the Lewis base. Complex compounds such as Et_{3}Al_{2}Cl_{3} and AlCl_{3} are treated as trigonal planar Lewis acids but exist as aggregates and polymers that must be degraded by the Lewis base. A simpler case is the formation of adducts of borane. Monomeric BH_{3} does not exist appreciably, so the adducts of borane are generated by degradation of diborane:

B_{2}H_{6} + 2 H^{−} → 2 BH^{−}_{4}

In this case, an intermediate B_{2}H^{−}_{7} can be isolated.

Many metal complexes serve as Lewis acids, but usually only after dissociating a more weakly bound Lewis base, often water.

[Mg(H_{2}O)_{6}]^{2+} + 6 NH_{3} → [Mg(NH_{3})_{6}]^{2+} + 6 H_{2}O

=== H^{+} as Lewis acid ===
The proton (H^{+}) is one of the strongest but is also one of the most complicated Lewis acids. It is convention to ignore the fact that a proton is heavily solvated (bound to solvent). With this simplification in mind, acid-base reactions can be viewed as the formation of adducts:

- H^{+} + NH_{3} → NH^{+}_{4}
- H^{+} + OH^{−} → H_{2}O

=== Applications of Lewis acids ===
A typical example of a Lewis acid in action is in the Friedel–Crafts alkylation reaction. The key step is the acceptance by AlCl_{3} of a chloride ion lone-pair, forming AlCl^{−}_{4} and creating the strongly acidic, that is, electrophilic, carbonium ion.

RCl + AlCl_{3} → R^{+} + AlCl^{−}_{4}

== Lewis bases ==
A Lewis base is an atomic or molecular species where the highest occupied molecular orbital (HOMO) is highly localized. Typical Lewis bases are conventional amines such as ammonia and alkyl amines. Other common Lewis bases include pyridine and its derivatives. They are nucleophilic in nature.

Some of the main classes of Lewis bases are:

- amines of the formula NH_{3−x}R_{x} where R = alkyl or aryl. Related to these are pyridine and its derivatives.
- phosphines of the formula PR_{3−x}Ar_{x}.
- compounds of O, S, Se and Te in oxidation state −2, including water, ethers, ketones

The most common Lewis bases are anions. The strength of Lewis basicity correlates with the pK_{a} of the parent acid: acids with high pK_{a}'s give good Lewis bases. As usual, a weaker acid has a stronger conjugate base.

- Examples of Lewis bases based on the general definition of electron pair donor include:
  - simple anions, such as H^{−} and F^{−}
  - other lone-pair-containing species, such as H_{2}O, NH_{3}, HO^{−}, and CH_{3}^{−}
  - complex anions, such as sulfate
  - electron-rich π-system Lewis bases, such as ethyne, ethene, and benzene

The strength of Lewis bases have been evaluated for various Lewis acids, such as I_{2}, SbCl_{5}, and BF_{3}.

Heats of binding of various bases to BF_{3}
Lewis base	Donor atom	Enthalpy of complexation (kJ/mol)
Quinuclidine	N	150
Et_{3}N	N	135
Pyridine	N	128
Acetonitrile	N	60
DMA	O	112
DMSO	O	105
THF	O	90.4
Et_{2}O	O	78.8
Acetone	O	76.0
EtOAc	O	75.5
Trimethylphosphine	P	97.3
Tetrahydrothiophene	S	51.6

=== Applications of Lewis bases ===
Nearly all electron pair donors that form compounds by binding transition elements can be viewed as ligands. Thus, a large application of Lewis bases is to modify the activity and selectivity of metal catalysts. Chiral Lewis bases, generally multidentate, confer chirality on a catalyst, enabling asymmetric catalysis, which is useful for the production of pharmaceuticals. The industrial synthesis of the anti-hypertension drug mibefradil uses a chiral Lewis base (R-MeOBIPHEP), for example.

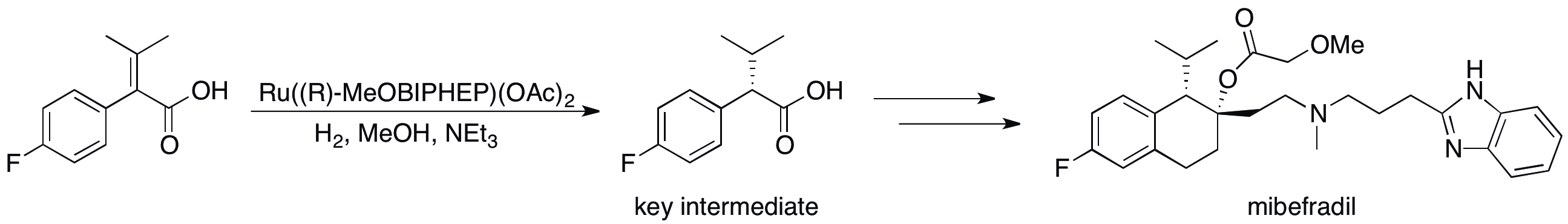

== Hard and soft classification ==
Lewis acids and bases are commonly classified according to their hardness or softness. In this context hard implies small and nonpolarizable and soft indicates larger atoms that are more polarizable.

- typical hard acids: H^{+}, alkali/alkaline earth metal cations, boranes, Zn^{2+}
- typical soft acids: Ag^{+}, Mo(0), Ni(0), Pt^{2+}
- typical hard bases: ammonia and amines, water, carboxylates, fluoride and chloride
- typical soft bases: organophosphines, thioethers, carbon monoxide, iodide

For example, an amine will displace phosphine from the adduct with the acid BF_{3}. In the same way, bases could be classified. For example, bases donating a lone pair from an oxygen atom are harder than bases donating through a nitrogen atom. Although the classification was never quantified it proved to be very useful in predicting the strength of adduct formation, using the key concepts that hard acid—hard base and soft acid—soft base interactions are stronger than hard acid—soft base or soft acid—hard base interactions. Later investigation of the thermodynamics of the interaction suggested that hard—hard interactions are enthalpy favored, whereas soft—soft are entropy favored.

== Quantifying Lewis acidity ==
Many methods have been devised to evaluate and predict Lewis acidity. Many are based on spectroscopic signatures such as shifts NMR signals or IR bands e.g. the Gutmann-Beckett method and the Childs method.

The ECW model is a quantitative model that describes and predicts the strength of Lewis acid base interactions, −ΔH. The model assigned E and C parameters to many Lewis acids and bases. Each acid is characterized by an E_{A} and a C_{A}. Each base is likewise characterized by its own E_{B} and C_{B}. The E and C parameters refer, respectively, to the electrostatic and covalent contributions to the strength of the bonds that the acid and base will form. The equation is

−ΔH = E_{A}E_{B} + C_{A}C_{B} + W

The W term represents a constant energy contribution for acid–base reaction such as the cleavage of a dimeric acid or base. The equation predicts reversal of acids and base strengths. The graphical presentations of the equation show that there is no single order of Lewis base strengths or Lewis acid strengths. and that single property scales are limited to a smaller range of acids or bases.

== History ==
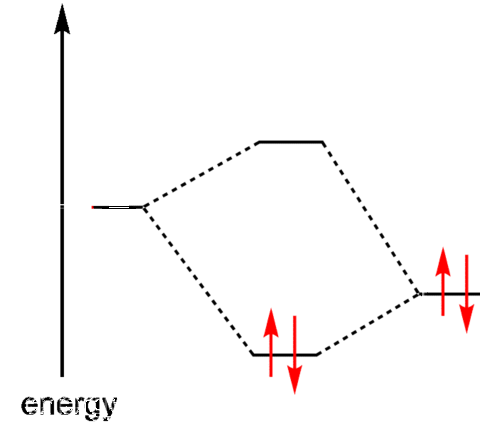
MO diagram depicting the formation of a dative covalent bond between two atoms

The concept originated with Gilbert N. Lewis who studied chemical bonding. In 1923, Lewis wrote: "An acid substance is one which can employ an electron lone pair from another molecule in completing the stable group of one of its own atoms." The Brønsted–Lowry acid–base theory was published in the same year. The two theories are distinct but complementary. A Lewis base is also a Brønsted–Lowry base, but a Lewis acid does not need to be a Brønsted–Lowry acid. The classification into hard and soft acids and bases (HSAB theory) followed in 1963. The strength of Lewis acid-base interactions, as measured by the standard enthalpy of formation of an adduct can be predicted by the Drago–Wayland two-parameter equation.

=== Reformulation of Lewis theory ===
Lewis had suggested in 1916 that two atoms are held together in a chemical bond by sharing a pair of electrons. When each atom contributed one electron to the bond, it was called a covalent bond. When both electrons come from one of the atoms, it was called a dative covalent bond or coordinate bond. The distinction is not very clear-cut. For example, in the formation of an ammonium ion from ammonia and hydrogen the ammonia molecule donates a pair of electrons to the proton; the identity of the electrons is lost in the ammonium ion that is formed. Nevertheless, Lewis suggested that an electron-pair donor be classified as a base and an electron-pair acceptor be classified as acid.

A more modern definition of a Lewis acid is an atomic or molecular species with a localized empty atomic or molecular orbital of low energy. This lowest-energy unoccupied molecular orbital (LUMO) can accommodate a pair of electrons.

=== Comparison with Brønsted–Lowry theory ===
A Lewis base is often a Brønsted–Lowry base as it can donate a pair of electrons to H^{+}; the proton is a Lewis acid as it can accept a pair of electrons. The conjugate base of a Brønsted–Lowry acid is also a Lewis base as loss of H^{+} from the acid leaves those electrons which were used for the A—H bond as a lone pair on the conjugate base. However, a Lewis base can be very difficult to protonate, yet still react with a Lewis acid. For example, carbon monoxide is a very weak Brønsted–Lowry base but it forms a strong adduct with BF_{3}.

In another comparison of Lewis and Brønsted–Lowry acidity by Brown and Kanner, 2,6-Di-tert-butylpyridine reacts to form the hydrochloride salt with HCl but does not react with BF_{3}. This example demonstrates that steric factors, in addition to electron configuration factors, play a role in determining the strength of the interaction between the bulky di-t-butylpyridine and tiny proton.

== See also ==
- Acid
- Base (chemistry)
- Acid–base reaction
- Brønsted–Lowry acid–base theory
- Chiral Lewis acid
- Frustrated Lewis pair
- Gutmann–Beckett method
- ECW model
- Philosophy of chemistry
