= 4-Methylcyclohexene =

Methylcyclohexene

Names
- Preferred IUPAC name 4-Methylcyclohex-1-ene
- Other names 2,3,4,5-Tetrahydrotoluene

Identifiers
CAS Number	591-47-9
3D model (JSmol)	Interactive image
Beilstein Reference	1901299
ChemSpider	11084
ECHA InfoCard	100.008.834
EC Number	209-715-4
PubChem CID	11572
UNII	H5WXT3SV31; TE4P8Q2044
UN number	3295
CompTox Dashboard (EPA)	DTXSID10862257; DTXSID10862257
- InChI: InChI=1S/C7H12/c1-7-5-3-2-4-6-7/h2-3,7H,4-6H2,1H3 Key: FSWCCQWDVGZMRD-UHFFFAOYSA-N
- SMILES: CC1CCC=CC1

Properties
Chemical formula	C_{7}H_{12}
Molar mass	96.173 g·mol^{−1}
Appearance	Colorless liquid
Density	0.799 g/mL
Melting point	−115.5 °C (−175.9 °F; 157.7 K)
Boiling point	103 °C (217 °F; 376 K)
Solubility in water	low

Hazards
- GHS labelling
Pictograms	(GHS02: Flammable) (GHS07: Exclamation mark) (GHS08: Health hazard)
Signal word	Warning
Hazard statements	H225, H304, H315, H319, H335
Precautionary statements	P210, P233, P240, P241, P242, P243, P261, P264, P271, P280, P301+P310, P302+P352, P303+P361+P353, P304+P340, P305+P351+P338, P312, P321, P331, P332+P313, P337+P313, P362, P370+P378, P403+P233, P403+P235, P405, P501
Flash point	−3 °C (27 °F; 270 K)
Safety data sheet (SDS)	MSDS (1-methylcyclohexene)
- Except where otherwise noted, data are given for materials in their standard state (at 25 °C [77 °F], 100 kPa). Infobox references

4-Methylcyclohexene is an organic compound consisting of cyclohexene with a methyl group substituent attached to carbon most distant from the alkene group. Two other structural isomers are known: 1-methylcyclohexene and 3-methylcyclohexene. All are colorless volatile liquids classified as a cyclic olefins. They are specialized reagents.

Methylcyclohexenes are formed by the partial hydrogenation of toluene to methylcyclohexane over ruthenium catalyst.

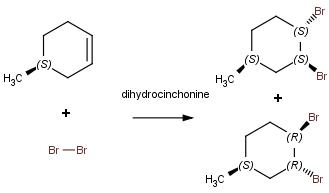
Bromination of methylcyclohexene

In the presence of a Cinchona alkaloid, bromination of an alkene can leads to optically active dibromides. For 4-methylcyclohexene, the (S)-configuration leads to two different products: the bromines can add at the axial positions, giving the orientation (1S,3R,4R), or at the equatorial positions, giving the orientation (1S,3S,4S). Similarly, the (R)-configuration produces two different products: axial addition yields the configuration (1R,3S,4S) and equatorial addition yields (1R,3R,4R).
