= 3-Methylcyclohexene =

Names
- Preferred IUPAC name 3-Methylcyclohex-1-ene

Identifiers
CAS Number	591-48-0
3D model (JSmol)	Interactive image
Beilstein Reference	1848550
ChemSpider	11085
EC Number	209-717-5
PubChem CID	11573
UNII	H5WXT3SV31; TE4P8Q2044
UN number	3295
CompTox Dashboard (EPA)	DTXSID70862258
- InChI: InChI=1S/C7H12/c1-7-5-3-2-4-6-7/h3,5,7H,2,4,6H2,1H3 Key: UZPWKTCMUADILM-UHFFFAOYSA-N
- SMILES: CC1CCCC=C1

Properties
Chemical formula	C_{7}H_{12}
Molar mass	96.173 g·mol^{−1}
Appearance	colorless liquid
Density	0.805 g/mL
Melting point	−124 °C (−191 °F; 149 K)
Boiling point	104 °C (219 °F; 377 K)
Solubility in water	low

Hazards
- GHS labelling
Pictograms	(GHS02: Flammable) (GHS07: Exclamation mark) (GHS08: Health hazard)
Signal word	Warning
Hazard statements	H225, H304, H315, H319, H335
Precautionary statements	P210, P233, P240, P241, P242, P243, P261, P264, P271, P280, P301+P310, P302+P352, P303+P361+P353, P304+P340, P305+P351+P338, P312, P321, P331, P332+P313, P337+P313, P362, P370+P378, P403+P233, P403+P235, P405, P501
Flash point	−3 °C (27 °F; 270 K)
Safety data sheet (SDS)	MSDS (1-methylcyclohexene)
- Except where otherwise noted, data are given for materials in their standard state (at 25 °C [77 °F], 100 kPa). Infobox references

3-Methylcyclohexene is an organic compound consisting of cyclohexene with a methyl group substituent adjacent to the alkene group. Two other structural isomers are known: 1-methylcyclohexene and 4-methylcyclohexene. All are colorless volatile liquids classified as a cyclic olefins. They are specialized reagents.

== Synthesis ==
3-Methylcyclohexene is produced from 3-methylcyclohexanone.
