= Toluene =

Aromatic hydrocarbon

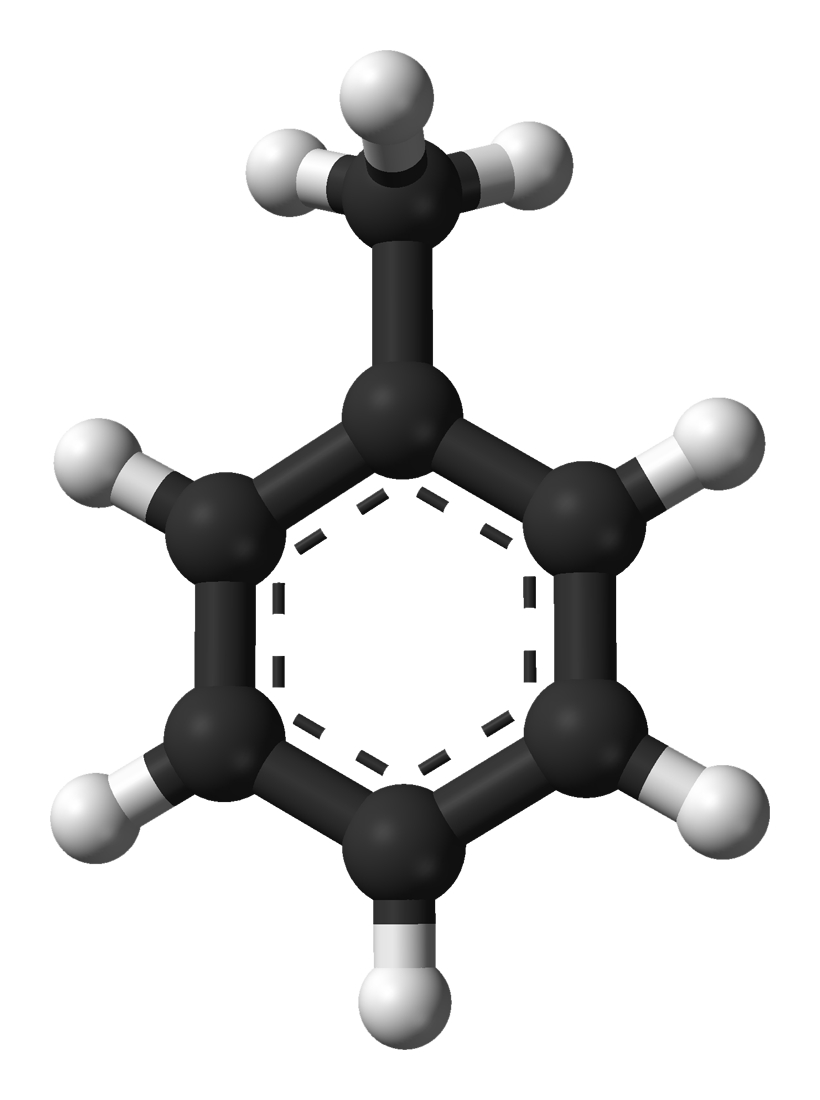

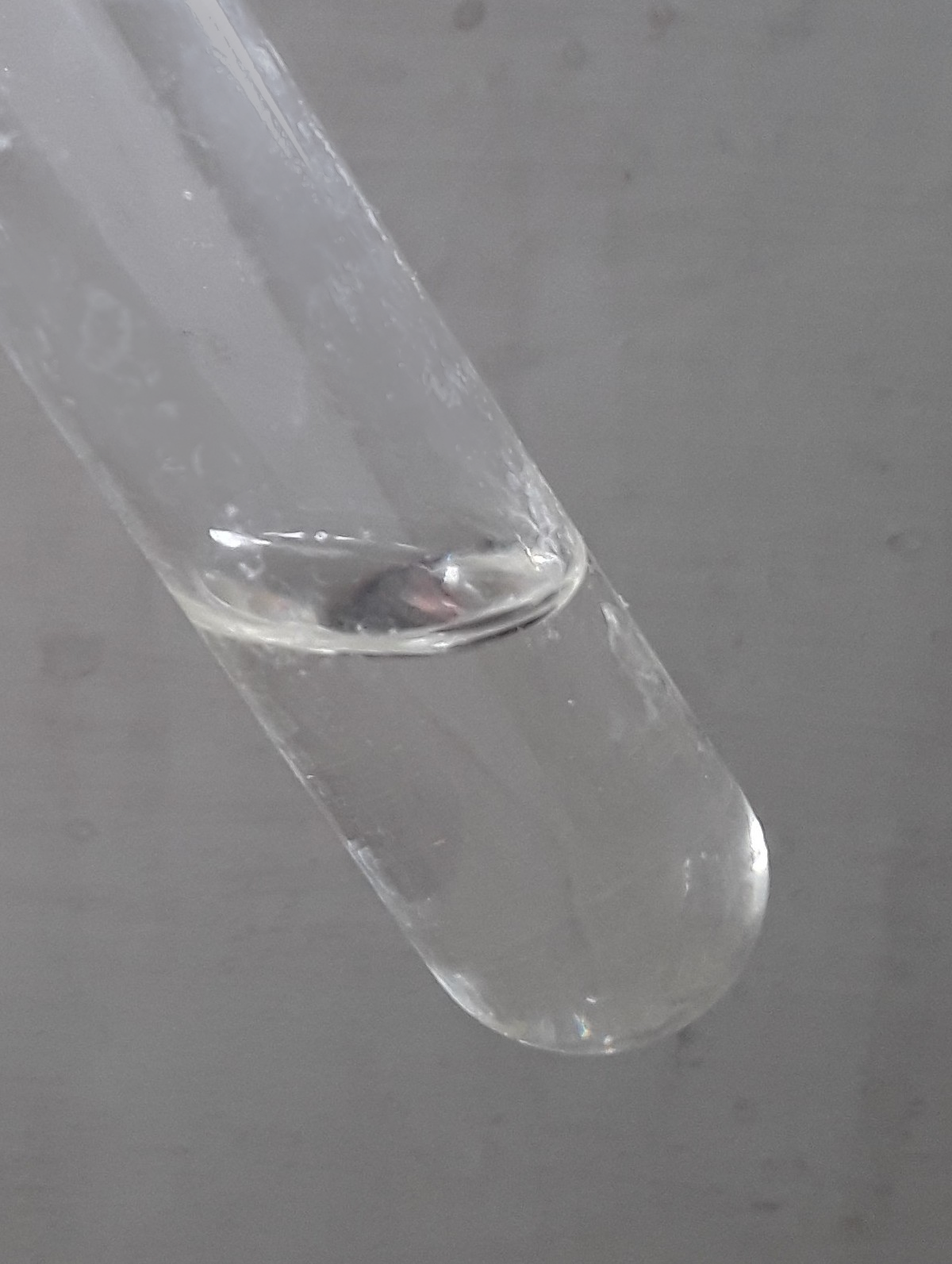
- Sample of toluene

Names
- Preferred IUPAC name Toluene
- Systematic IUPAC name Methylbenzene
- Other names: Methyl benzene; Phenylmethane; Toluol (historic, German)

Identifiers
CAS Number	108-88-3
3D model (JSmol)	Interactive image
Abbreviations	MB; PhMe; MePh; PhCH_{3} BnH; Tol
ChEBI	CHEBI:17578
ChEMBL	ChEMBL9113
ChemSpider	1108
DrugBank	DB01900
ECHA InfoCard	100.003.297
IUPHAR/BPS	5481
KEGG	C01455
PubChem CID	1140
RTECS number	XS5250000
UNII	3FPU23BG52
UN number	1294
CompTox Dashboard (EPA)	DTXSID7021360
- InChI: InChI=1S/C7H8/c1-7-5-3-2-4-6-7/h2-6H,1H3 Key: YXFVVABEGXRONW-UHFFFAOYSA-N; InChI=1/C7H8/c1-7-5-3-2-4-6-7/h2-6H,1H3 Key: YXFVVABEGXRONW-UHFFFAOYAT
- SMILES: Cc1ccccc1

Properties
Chemical formula	C_{7}H_{8}
Molar mass	92.141 g·mol^{−1}
Appearance	Colorless liquid
Odor	sweet, pungent, benzene-like
Density	0.8623 g/mL (25 °C)
Melting point	−95.0 °C (−139.0 °F; 178.2 K)
Boiling point	110.60 °C (231.08 °F; 383.75 K)
Solubility in water	0.54 g/L (5 °C); 0.519 g/L (25 °C); 0.63 g/L (45 °C); 1.2 g/L (90 °C)
log P	2.73
Vapor pressure	2.8 kPa (20 °C)
Magnetic susceptibility (χ)	−66.1·10^{−6} cm^{3}/mol
Thermal conductivity	0.1310 W/(m·K) (25 °C)
Refractive index (n_{D})	1.4941 (25 °C)
Viscosity	0.560 mPa·s (25 °C)

Structure
Dipole moment	0.375 D

Thermochemistry
Heat capacity (C)	157.3 J/(mol·K)
Std enthalpy of formation (Δ_{f}H^{⦵}_{298})	12.4 kJ/mol
Std enthalpy of combustion (Δ_{c}H^{⦵}_{298})	3.910 MJ/mol

Hazards
- Occupational safety and health (OHS/OSH)
Main hazards	highly flammable
- GHS labelling
Pictograms	(GHS02: Flammable) (GHS08: Health hazard) (GHS07: Exclamation mark)
Signal word	Danger
Hazard statements	H225, H304, H315, H336, H361d, H373
Precautionary statements	P210, P240, P301+P310, P302+P352, P308+P313, P314, P403+P233
NFPA 704 (fire diamond)	2 3 0
Flash point	4 °C (39 °F; 277 K)
Autoignition temperature	480 °C (896 °F; 753 K)
Explosive limits	1.1–7.1%
Threshold limit value (TLV)	50 mL/m^{3}, 190 mg/m^{3}
- Lethal dose or concentration (LD, LC)
LC_{50} (median concentration)	>26700 ppm (rat, 1 h); 400 ppm (mouse, 24 h)
LC_{Lo} (lowest published)	55,000 ppm (rabbit, 40 min)
- NIOSH (US health exposure limits)
PEL (Permissible)	TWA 200 ppm C 300 ppm 500 ppm (10-minute maximum peak)
REL (Recommended)	TWA 100 ppm (375 mg/m^{3}); ST 150 ppm (560 mg/m^{3})
IDLH (Immediate danger)	500 ppm
Safety data sheet (SDS)	SIRI.org

Related compounds
Related aromatic hydrocarbons	benzene; xylene; naphthalene
Related compounds	methylcyclohexane; methylcyclohexene

Supplementary data page
- Toluene (data page)
- Except where otherwise noted, data are given for materials in their standard state (at 25 °C [77 °F], 100 kPa). verify (what is ?) Infobox references

Toluene (/ˈtɒl.juiːn/), also known as toluol (/ˈtɒl.ju.ɒl, -ɔːl, -oʊl/), is a substituted aromatic hydrocarbon with the chemical formula C_{6}H_{5}CH_{3}, often abbreviated as PhCH_{3}, where Ph stands for the phenyl group. Toluene is a colorless, water-insoluble liquid with a sweet smell, and is partially responsible for the aroma of gasoline and paint fumes. It is a mono-substituted benzene derivative, consisting of a methyl group (CH_{3}) attached to a phenyl group by a single bond. As such, its systematic IUPAC name is methylbenzene. Toluene is predominantly used as an industrial feedstock and a solvent.

As the solvent in some types of paint thinner, permanent markers, contact cement and certain types of glue, toluene is sometimes used as a recreational inhalant and has the potential of causing severe neurological harm.

== History ==
The compound was first isolated and kept in 1837 through a distillation of pine oil by Pierre Joseph Pelletier and Filip Neriusz Walter, who named it rétinnaphte. In 1841, Henri Étienne Sainte-Claire Deville isolated a hydrocarbon from balsam of Tolu (an aromatic extract from the tropical Colombian tree Myroxylon balsamum), which Deville recognized as similar to Walter's rétinnaphte and to benzene; hence he called the new hydrocarbon benzoène. In 1843, Jöns Jacob Berzelius recommended the alternative name for it which was toluin. In 1850, French chemist Auguste Cahours isolated from a distillate of wood a hydrocarbon which he recognized as similar to Deville's benzoène and which Cahours named toluène.

== Chemical properties ==
The distance between carbon atoms in the toluene ring is 0.1399 nm. The C-CH_{3} bond is longer at 0.1524 nm, while the average C-H bond length is 0.111 nm.

=== Ring reactions ===
Toluene reacts as a normal aromatic hydrocarbon in electrophilic aromatic substitution. Because the methyl group has greater electron-releasing properties than a hydrogen atom in the same position, toluene is more reactive than benzene toward electrophiles. It undergoes sulfonation to give p-toluenesulfonic acid, and chlorination by Cl_{2} in the presence of FeCl_{3} to give ortho- and para- isomers of chlorotoluene.

Nitration of toluene gives mono-, di-, and trinitrotoluene, all of which are widely used. Dinitrotoluene is the precursor to toluene diisocyanate, a precursor to polyurethane foam. Trinitrotoluene (TNT) is an explosive.

Complete hydrogenation of toluene gives methylcyclohexane. The reaction requires a high pressure of hydrogen and a catalyst.

=== Side chain reactions ===
The C-H bonds of the methyl group in toluene are benzylic, therefore they are weaker than C-H bonds in simpler alkanes. Reflecting this weakness, the methyl group in toluene undergoes a variety of free radical reactions. For example, when heated with N-bromosuccinimide (NBS) in the presence of AIBN, toluene converts to benzyl bromide. The same conversion can be effected with elemental bromine in the presence of UV light or even sunlight.

Toluene may also be brominated by treating it with HBr and H_{2}O_{2} in the presence of light.

C_{6}H_{5}CH_{3} + Br_{2} → C_{6}H_{5}CH_{2}Br + HBr

Benzoic acid and benzaldehyde are produced commercially by partial oxidation of toluene with oxygen. Typical catalysts include cobalt or manganese naphthenates. Related but laboratory-scale oxidations involve the use of potassium permanganate to yield benzoic acid and chromyl chloride to yield benzaldehyde (Étard reaction).

The methyl group in toluene undergoes deprotonation only with very strong bases; its pK_{a} is estimated using acidity trends to be approximately 43 in dimethyl sulfoxide (DMSO) and its ion pair acidity is extrapolated to be 41.2 in cyclohexylamine (Cesium Cyclohexylamide) using a Bronsted correlation.

=== Miscibility ===
Toluene is miscible (soluble in all proportions) with ethanol, benzene, diethyl ether, acetone, chloroform, glacial acetic acid and carbon disulfide, but immiscible with water.

== Production ==
Toluene occurs naturally at low levels in crude oil and is a byproduct in the production of gasoline by a catalytic reformer or ethylene cracker. It is also a byproduct of the production of coke from coal. Final separation and purification is done by any of the distillation or solvent extraction processes used for BTX aromatics (benzene, toluene, and xylene isomers).

=== Other preparative routes ===
Toluene can be prepared by a variety of methods. For example, benzene reacts with methanol in presence of a solid acid to give toluene and water:

$$\ce{C6H6 + CH3OH ->[t^o]C6H5CH3 + H2O}$$

== Uses ==
Toluene is one of the most abundantly produced chemicals. Its main uses are (1) as a precursor to benzene and xylenes, (2) as a solvent for thinners, paints, lacquers, adhesives, and (3) as an additive for gasoline. In 2013, worldwide sales of toluene amounted to about 24.5 billion US dollars.

=== Precursor to benzene and xylenes ===
Toluene is converted to benzene via hydrodealkylation:

C_{6}H_{5}CH_{3} + H_{2} → C_{6}H_{6} + CH_{4}

Its transalkylation gives a mixture of benzene and xylenes.

=== Solvent ===
Toluene is widely used in the paint, dye, rubber, chemical, glue, printing, and pharmaceutical industries as a solvent. Nail polish, paintbrush cleaners, and stain removers may contain toluene. Manufacturing of explosives (TNT) uses it as well. Toluene is also found in cigarette smoke and car exhaust. If not in contact with air, toluene can remain unchanged in soil or water for a long time.

Toluene is a common solvent, e.g. for paints, paint thinners, strippers, silicone sealants, many chemical reactants, rubber, printing ink, adhesives (glues), lacquers, leather tanners, and disinfectants.

=== Fuel ===
Toluene is an octane booster in gasoline fuels for internal combustion engines as well as jet fuel and turbocharged engines in Formula One.

In Australia in 2003, toluene was found to have been illegally combined with petrol in fuel outlets for sale as standard vehicular fuel. Toluene incurs no fuel excise tax, while other fuels are taxed at more than 40%, providing a greater profit margin for fuel suppliers. The extent of toluene substitution is claimed to be 60%.

=== Niche applications ===
In the laboratory, toluene is used as a solvent for carbon nanomaterials, including nanotubes and fullerenes, and it can also be used as a fullerene indicator. The color of the toluene solution of C_{60} is bright purple. Toluene is used as a cement for fine polystyrene kits (by dissolving and then fusing surfaces) as it can be applied very precisely by brush and contains none of the bulk of an adhesive. Toluene can be used to break open red blood cells in order to extract hemoglobin in biochemistry experiments. Toluene has also been used as a coolant for its good heat transfer capabilities in sodium cold traps used in nuclear reactor system loops. Toluene had also been used in the process of removing the cocaine from coca leaves in the production of Coca-Cola syrup.

== Toxicology and metabolism ==
The environmental and toxicological effects of toluene have been extensively studied.

Toluene is irritating to the eyes, skin, and respiratory tract. It is absorbed slowly through the skin. It can cause systemic toxicity by inhalation or ingestion. Inhalation is the most common route of exposure. Symptoms of toluene poisoning include central nervous system effects (headache, dizziness, drowsiness, ataxia, euphoria, tremors, hallucinations, seizures, and coma), chemical pneumonitis, respiratory depression, ventricular arrhythmias, nausea, vomiting, and electrolyte imbalances.

Inhalation of toluene in low to moderate levels can cause tiredness, confusion, weakness, drunken-type actions, memory loss, nausea, loss of appetite, hearing loss, and colour vision loss. Some of these symptoms usually disappear when exposure is stopped. Inhaling high levels of toluene in a short time may cause light-headedness, nausea, or sleepiness, unconsciousness, and even death. Toluene is, however, much less toxic than benzene, and as a consequence, largely replaced it as an aromatic solvent in chemical preparation. The US Environmental Protection Agency (EPA) states that the carcinogenic potential of toluene cannot be evaluated due to insufficient information.

Toluene occurs as an indoor air pollutant in a number of processes including electrosurgery, and can be removed from the air with an activated carbon filter.

Similarly to many other solvents such as 1,1,1-trichloroethane and some alkylbenzenes, toluene has been shown to act as a non-competitive NMDA receptor antagonist and GABA_{A} receptor positive allosteric modulator. Additionally, toluene has been shown to display antidepressant-like effects in rodents in the forced swim test (FST) and the tail suspension test (TST), likely due to its NMDA antagonist properties.

Toluene inhibits excitatory ion channels such as the NMDA receptor, nicotinic acetylcholine receptor, and the serotonin 5-HT_{3} receptor. It also potentiates the function of inhibitory ion channels, such as the GABA_{A} and glycine receptors. In addition, toluene disrupts voltage-gated calcium channels and ATP-gated ion channels.

=== Recreational use ===
Toluene is sometimes used as a recreational inhalant ("glue sniffing"), likely on account of its euphoric and dissociative effects, in a manner unintended by manufacturers. People inhale toluene-containing products (e.g., paint thinner, contact cement, correction pens, model glue, etc.) for its intoxicating effect. The possession and use of toluene and products containing it are regulated in many jurisdictions, for the supposed reason of preventing minors from obtaining these products for recreational drug purposes. As of 2007, 24 US states had laws penalizing use, possession with intent to use, and/or distribution of such inhalants. In 2005 the European Union banned the general sale of products consisting of greater than 0.5% toluene.

=== Bioremediation ===
Several types of fungi including Cladophialophora, Exophiala, Leptodontidium (syn. Leptodontium), Pseudeurotium zonatum, and Cladosporium sphaerospermum, and certain species of bacteria can degrade toluene, using it as a source of carbon and energy.

== Cited sources ==
- Haynes, William M., ed. (2016). CRC Handbook of Chemistry and Physics (97th ed.). CRC Press. ISBN 978-1-4987-5429-3.
