= Benjamin (name) =

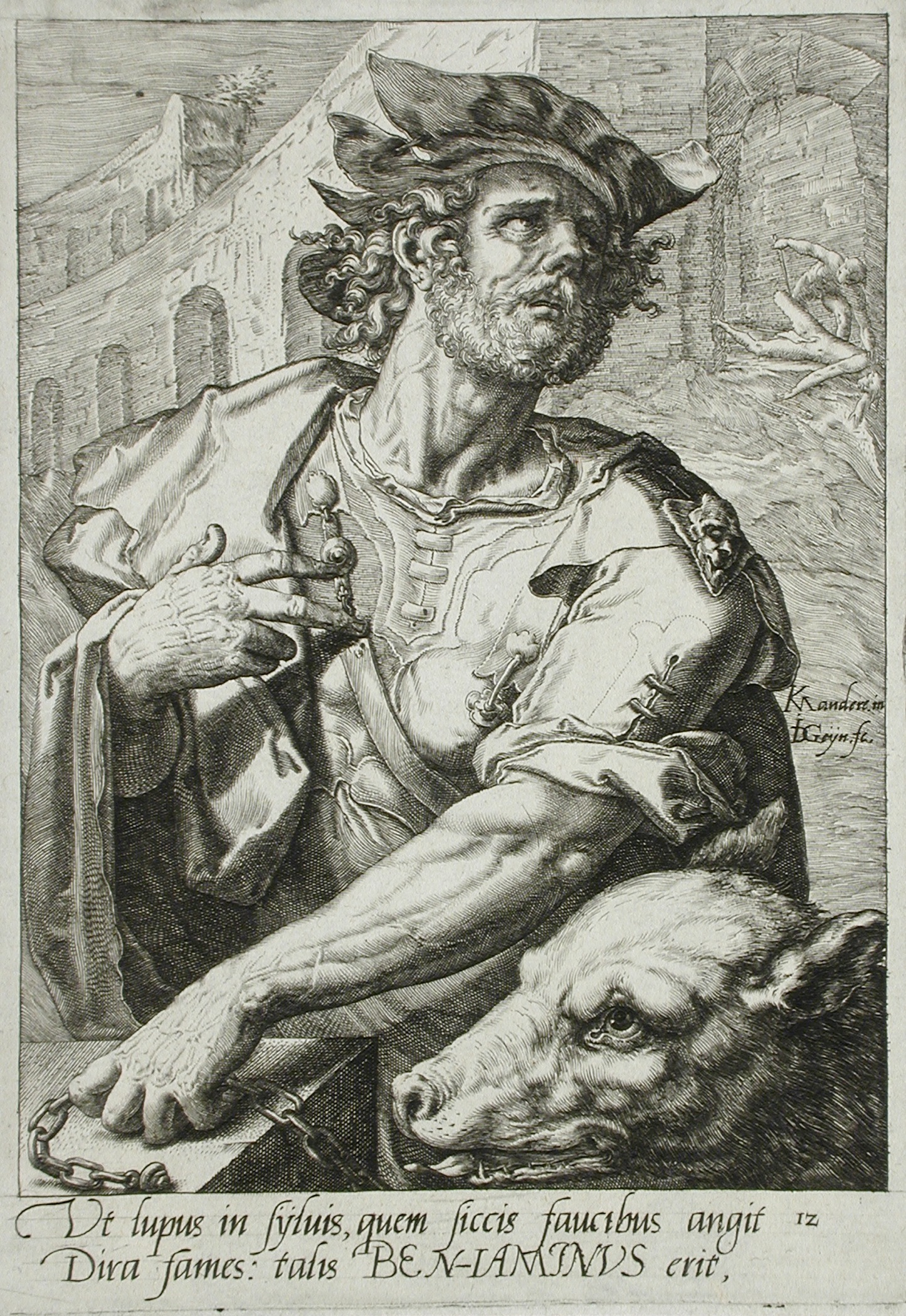
- Portrait of Benjamin, son of Israel and the first to use that name (by Jacob de Gheyn II)
- Pronunciation: /ˈbɛndʒəmɪn/ BEN-jə-min; French: [bɛ̃ʒamɛ̃] German: [ˈbɛnjamiːn] Hebrew: [bɪnjaˈmin] Swedish: [ˈbêːnjamɪn]
- Gender: Male

Origin
- Origin: בִּנְיָמִין Binyāmīn
- Meaning: 'Son of my right hand'

Other names
- Variant forms: Benyaameen, Benyāmīn, Binyaameen, Binyāmīn
- Nicknames: Ben, Bengie, Benj, Benjy, Benji, Benjoi, Benjie, Benjo, Benno, Benny, Benson, Benvolio, Benzino, Biniam

Benjamin is a common given name for males, derived from Hebrew בִּנְיָמִין, Binyāmīn, translating as 'son of the right [hand]' in both Hebrew and Arabic languages, although in the Samaritan Pentateuch the name appears as Binyamem: 'son of my days'.

Benjamin is often shortened to Ben, and sometimes to Benny, Benito, Benjy, Benji, etc. It is also a patronymic surname. Like many biblical names, it is popular in the Jewish, Christian and Muslim faiths alike, having many variant forms in other languages.

The "Benjamin of the family" is a phrase used in several languages to refer to the youngest son – especially when he is much younger than his brothers (see also the "youngest son" stock character in fiction). Sometimes the name is chosen for a son born to mature parents unlikely to have more children, especially if he has several older siblings. Both of these usages derive from the biblical son of Jacob of that name, who occupied that position in his family.

In some language with Sanskrit root, such as Thai language, Benja or Benjama is also derivative of pañca which means 'five' or 'the fifth'. And can be merged with Indra to form the name homophone name Benjamin (which means 'the fifth Indra', sometimes written Benchamin). There are also many similar name start with Banja- or Benjama- with other combination such as Benjawan (used by some actresses and models in Thailand) or Benjamat (female name, also means the flower Chrysanthemum).

Alternate versions of the name exist for females, like Benjamina.

== Variants ==
- Arabic: بنيامين (Binyāmīn)
- Assyrian Neo-Aramaic: ܒܸܢܝܵܡܹܝܢ (Binyāmēn)
- Bengali: বিনয়ামিন, বিন ইয়ামিন, বনিয়ামিন, বেঞ্জামিন, বেনজামিন (Binyamin, Bin Iẏamin, Boniamin, Beñjamin, Benjamin)
- Bosnian: Benjamin
- Chinese: 本杰明 (Běnjiémíng) / 本雅明 (Běnyǎmíng)
- Croatian: Benjamin
- Czech: Benjamín
- Dutch: Benjamin
- English: Benjamin
- Ethiopia: Biniyam
- Eritrea: Biniyam
- French: Benjamin
- Galician: Benxamín
- German: Benjamin
- Greek: Βενιαμίν (Veniamín)
- Hawaiian: Peni
- Hebrew: בנימין (Binyamín)
- Hindi: बिन्यामीन (Binyāmīn), बिन्यामिन (Binyāmin), बेंजमिन (Bēñjamin), बेंजामिन (Bēñjāmin)
- Hungarian: Benjámin
- Icelandic: Benjamín
- Indonesian: Benyamin, Benjamin
- Italian: Beniamino
- Latin: Benjamin
- Japanese: ベンジャミン (Benjamin)
- Korean: 벤자민 (Benjamin)
- Lithuanian: Benjaminas, Benas
- Macedonian: Бенџамин (Bendžamin), Венјамин (Venyamin)
- Marathi: बिन्यामीन (Binyāmīn), बिन्यामिन (Binyāmin), बेंजमिन (Bēñjamin), बेंजामिन (Bēñjāmin)
- Norwegian: Benjamin
- Persian: بنیامین (Binyāmīn)
- Polish: Beniamin
- Portuguese: Benjamim
- Romanian: Beniamin, Benjamin
- Russian: Вениамин (Veniamin, Venyamin), Веня (Venya)
- Serbian: Бењамин (Benjamin)
- Slovak: Benjamín
- Slovenian: Benjamin, Beno
- Spanish: Benjamín
- Swedish: Benjamin
- Telugu: బెన్యామీను (Benyāmīnu)
- Turkish: Bünyamin, Benyamin
- Urdu: بنیامین (Binyāmīn)
- Yiddish: Binyomin

== Given name ==
Notable people with the name Benjamin or its variant spellings include:

- Benjamin II (1818–1864), the pen name of a Romanian traveller
- Pope Benjamin II of Alexandria (1327–1339), Coptic Pope
- Benjamin (Khazar), ruler of the late 9th and early 10th centuries
- Saint Benjamin (disambiguation), multiple people
- Benjamin Adler (1903–1990), American electrical engineer and inventor
- Ben Affleck (born 1972), American film screenwriter, director and actor
- Benjamin Agosto (born 1982), American figure skater
- Benjamin Alarie (born 1977), Canadian legal scholar, law professor, and entrepreneur
- Benjamin De Almeida (born 1999), Canadian-American YouTuber and TikToker
- Benjamin Balleret (born 1983), Monegasque tennis player
- Benjamin Banneker (1731–1806), American author and surveyor
- Ben Barnes (actor) (born 1981), British actor
- Benjamin Biolay (born 1973), French singer, songwriter, producer and actor
- Benjamin Bowden (1906–1998), British industrial designer
- Benjamin F. Bowles (1869–1928), African American civil rights leader, and founder and president of Douglass University
- Benjamin Bowman (born 1979), American-Canadian violinist
- Benjamin Brahmer (born 2004), American football player
- Benjamin Breedlove (1993–2011), American YouTube and internet personality
- Benjamin Britten (1913–1976), British composer
- Benjamin Buit (born 2008), Dutch YouTuber
- Benjamin Burnley (born 1978), lead singer of American rock band Breaking Benjamin
- Benjamin Butler (1818–1893), American lawyer, politician, soldier and businessman
- Benjamin Cardozo (1870–1938), U.S. Supreme Court Justice
- Benjamin Carrigan (born 1998), Australian association football player
- Benjamin F. Cheatham (1820–1886), Confederate general and California gold miner
- Benjamin Chee Chee (1944–1977), Canadian artist
- Benjamin Colbath, American politician
- Benjamin Constant (1767–1830), Swiss-born French politician
- Benjamin Constant (military) (1836–1891), Brazilian general and politician
- Benjamin Cutting (born 1987), Australian cricketer
- Benjamin Dahlström (born 2003), Finnish footballer
- Benjamin Daviet (born 1989), French male cross-country skier and biathlete
- Benjamin Diskin (born 1982), American voice actor
- Benjamin Disraeli (1804–1881), Prime Minister of the United Kingdom
- Benjamin Faunce (1873–1949), American druggist and businessman
- Ben Folds (born 1966), American musician and songwriter
- Benjamin W. Fortson IV, American linguist
- Benjamin Franklin (1706–1790), one of the Founding Fathers of the United States
- Benjamin Frick (1796–1871), American politician from Pennsylvania
- Benjamin Graham (1894–1976), British-born American investor, economist, and professor
- Benjamin Guggenheim (1865–1912), American businessman and Titanic passenger
- Benjamin W. Gung (born 1953), Chinese American organic chemist and academic
- Benjamin Hall (disambiguation), multiple people, including
  - Benjamin Hall (athlete) (born 1984), Australian Paralympic athlete
  - Benjamin Hall (industrialist) (1778–1817), British politician
  - Benjamin Hall (journalist) (born 1982), British journalist
- Benjamin Hance (born 2000), Australian Paralympic swimmer
- Benjamin Harrison (disambiguation), multiple people, but most notably:
  - Benjamin Harrison (1833–1901), 23rd president of the United States
  - Benjamin Harrison V (1726–1791), a Founding Father of the United States, signer of the Declaration of Independence, and Governor of Virginia
- Benjamin Hick (1790–1842) English engineer and inventor
- Ben Hogan (1912–1997), American professional golfer
- Benjamin Huin (born 1992), French politician
- Ben Jonson (1572–1637), English playwright and poet, in his time second only to Shakespeare
- Benjamin Kallos (born 1981), American lawyer and politician
- Benjamin Kapp (born 2002), German curler
- Benjamin Kheng (born 1990), Singaporean singer
- Benjamin Kimutai (born 1971), Kenyan long-distance runner
- Benjamin Kowalewicz (born 1975), lead singer of Canadian rock band Billy Talent
- Benjamin H. Kline (1894–1974), American cinematographer and film director
- Benjamin Källman (born 1998), Finnish footballer
- Benjamin Lambert (1937–2014), American optometrist and politician
- Benjamin Lay (1682–1759), Anglo-American abolitionist, activist, and humanitarian
- Ben Lee (disambiguation), multiple people, including:
  - Ben Lee (born 1978), Australian musician and songwriter
  - Benjamin F. Lee (born 1841–1926), American bishop and educator
- Benjamin Lefebvre, American politician
- Benjamin Leiner (Benny Leonard; the "Ghetto Wizard"; 1896–1947), American world champion lightweight Hall of Fame boxer
- Benjamin Leuenberger (born 1982), Swiss businessman and former racing driver
- Benjamin Lock (born 1993), Zimbabwean tennis player
- Benjamin Luxon (1937–2024), British baritone singer
- Benjamin Lynch (born 2002), Irish-Canadian freestyle skier
- Benjamin Mazar (1906–1995), Israeli historian and archeologist; president of the Hebrew University of Jerusalem
- Benjamin McKenzie (born 1978), American actor
- Benjamin Millepied (born 1977), French dancer and choreographer
- Benjamin K. Miller (judge) (1936–2024), American judge
- Benjamin Mielke (born 1981), German bobsledder
- Benjamin Milstein (1918–2013), British heart surgeon
- Benjamin Miskowitsch (born 1984), German politician
- Benjamin Mkapa (1938–2020), 3rd president of Tanzania
- Benjamin Mwangata (born 1966), Tanzanian boxer
- Benjamin Netanyahu (born 1949), Israeli prime minister
- Benjamin Nolot, American documentary filmmaker
- Benjamin Noriega-Ortiz (born 1956), Puerto Rican-born interior designer
- Benjamin of Tudela, 12th-century Spanish rabbi
- Benjamin Okolski, American figure skater
- Benjamin Orr (1947–2000), American bass guitarist and singer-songwriter of The Cars
- Benjamin Østvold (born 2001), Norwegian ski jumper
- Benjamin Palm (born 2001), Ghanaian tennis player
- Benjamin Pavard (born 1996), French professional footballer
- Benjamin Peltonen, Finnish recording artist, known mononymously as Benjamin
- Benjamin Franklin Perera, Sri Lankan Sinhala diplomat
- Benjamin Perrin, Canadian professor
- Benjamin Pritchard (rower), British para-rower
- Benjamin Raschke (born 1982), German politician
- Benjamin Reemst (born 2000), Dutch footballer
- Benjamin Wood Richards (1797–1851), 59th mayor of Philadelphia
- Benjamin Rush (1746–1813), American politician, revolutionary, humanitarian, physician, educator, and founder of Dickinson College
- Don Benjamin Rupasinghe Gunawardena (1904–1971), Sri Lankan politician
- Benjamin Shapiro (born 1984), American conservative political commentator
- Benjamin Frank Shelton (1902–1963) American singer
- Benjamin Šeško (born 2003), Slovenian professional footballer
- Ben Simm (disambiguation), multiple people, Benjamin, including Sim, Sims, Simms
- Benjamin Smoke (1960–1999), American musician
- Benjamin Spock (1903–1998), American pediatrician, political activist, and writer
- Benjamin St-Juste (born 1997), Canadian-American football player
- Benyamin Sueb (1939–1995), Indonesian actor
- Ben Stiller (born 1965), American actor
- Benjamin Tatar (born 1994), Bosnia and Herzegovina footballer
- Benjamin Tee, Singaporean scientist and inventor
- Benj Thall (born 1978), American director, film editor, and former child actor
- Benjamin Timbrell (c. 1683 – 1754), English master builder and architect
- Benjamin (Benji) Ungar (born 1986), American fencer
- Benjamin Verbič (born 1993), Slovenian professional footballer
- Benjamin de Vries (born 1923), Dutch-Israeli economic historian
- Benjamin Wade (1800–1878), American lawyer and US senator
- Benjamin Wallace (circus owner) (1847–1921), American circus owner
- Benjamin Wallace (writer), American author and magazine writer
- Benjamin Washburne (born 2001), American pararower
- Benjamin Lee Whorf (1897–1941), American linguist, known for contributing to the Sapir-Whorf hypothesis
- Ben Whitehead also known as Benjamin Whitehead, English actor and voice actor
- Benjamin Wildman-Tobriner (born 1984), American 2008 Gold Medal Olympic swimmer and former world record holder
- Benjamin Willoughby (1855–1940), Justice of the Indiana Supreme Court
- Benjamin Yuen (born 1981), Hong Kong actor and singer
- Benjamin Yusupov (born 1962), Israeli classical composer, conductor and pianist
- Benjamin Zablocki (1941–2020), American sociologist
- Benjamin Zendel, Canadian psychologist
- Benjamin E. Zeller, American academic
- Benjamin Zephaniah (1958–2023), British poet and writer
- Benjamin Zhang Bin (born 1974), Chinese Manhua artist and illustrator
- Biniam Girmay (born 2000), Eritrean professional road cyclist
- Biniam Mehary (born 2006), Ethiopian middle and long-distance runner

=== Fictional characters ===
- Benjamin, a donkey from George Orwell's novel Animal Farm
- Benjamin the Elephant (original German name Benjamin Blümchen), the main character of the same named television series
- Benjamin Bunny, Peter Rabbit's cousin in The Tale of Benjamin Bunny by Beatrix Potter
- Benjamin Button, the title character of both short story and film
- Benjamin C. L., known as Soldier Boy, from the third season of Amazon Prime Video's The Boys
- Benjamin Franklin Parker, known as Uncle Ben, from Marvel Comics's Spider-Man
- Principal Benjamin Krupp, the school principal and title character from Captain Underpants
- Benjamin (Ben) Linus, a recurring antagonist in Lost
- Capt. Benjamin Franklin "Hawkeye" Pierce, the main character from the M*A*S*H novels, the film and the television series
- Benjamin Jacob "Ben" Grimm, also known as the Thing, from Marvel Comics
- Benjamin Sisko, Commanding Officer of Deep Space Nine in the Star Trek: Deep Space Nine television series
- Benjamin Kirby Tennyson (better known as Ben or Ben 10) from Cartoon Network's Ben 10 franchise
- Ben Solo, son of Han Solo and Leia Organa, main character in the sequel trilogy of Star Wars Saga portrayed by Adam Driver

== Surname ==
- Abraham Cornelius Benjamin (1897–1968), American philosopher
- Adam Benjamin Jr. (1935–1982), American politician
- Adam Benjamin (musician), American musician
- Albert Benjamin (1909–2006), Scottish bridge player
- Alec Benjamin (born 1994), American singer-songwriter
- André Benjamin, the birth name of André 3000 (born 1975), American musician and actor, co-founder of Outkast
- Anna Smeed Benjamin (1834–1924), American social reformer
- Arthur Benjamin (1893–1960), Australian composer
- Asher Benjamin (1773–1845), American architect
- Benoit Benjamin (born 1964), American basketball player
- Clinton Benjamin (died 2005), Nauruan politician
- Collin Benjamin (born 1978), Namibian footballer
- Emmanuel Benjamin (born 1955), Indian cricketer
- Eno Benjamin (born 1999), American football player
- Eugene S. Benjamin (1862–1941), American businessman and philanthropist
- François Benjamin (born 1962), Canadian politician
- Floella Benjamin (born 1949), British actress and businesswoman
- George Benjamin (composer) (born 1960), British composer
- Georges C. Benjamin (born 1952), American public health official
- H. Jon Benjamin (born 1966), American comedian and actor
- Harry Benjamin (1885–1986), German-born American sexologist
- Hilde Benjamin (1902–1989), East German judge and politician
- J. J. Benjamin (1818–1864), Romanian-Jewish historian and traveler
- Jessica Benjamin (born 1946), American feminist and psychoanalyst
- Joel Benjamin (born 1964), American chess grandmaster
- John Benjamin (disambiguation), multiple people
- Jon Benjamin (disambiguation), multiple people
- Judah P. Benjamin (1811–1884), American politician and treasurer of CSA
- Kelvin Benjamin (born 1991), American football wide receiver
- Leanne Benjamin (born 1964), Australian ballet dancer
- Lewis Saul Benjamin (1874–1932), birth name of English author Lewis Melville
- Lucy Benjamin (born 1970), British actress
- Maurice Benjamin, British Empire aerial gunner
- Medea Benjamin, political activist
- Melanie Benjamin (author) (born 1962), pen name of American writer Melanie Hauser
- Melanie Benjamin (Ojibwe leader), chief executive of the Mille Lacs Band of Ojibwe
- Miles Benjamin (born 1988), English rugby union player
- Quanteisha Benjamin (born 1991/92), Canadian singer
- Rai Benjamin (born 1997), American track athlete
- Raphael Benjamin (1846–1906), British-born Australian and American rabbi
- Regina Benjamin (born 1956), 18th Surgeon General of the United States
- René Benjamin (1885–1948), French author
- Rich Benjamin, American journalist and writer
- Richard Benjamin (born 1938), American actor and film director
- Rick Benjamin (disambiguation), multiple people
- Ryan Benjamin (disambiguation), multiple people
- Shelton Benjamin (born 1975), American wrestler
- Simeon Benjamin (1792–1868), American businessman, philanthropist, and benefactor of Elmira College
- Stan Benjamin (1914–2009), American baseball player
- Trevor Benjamin (born 1979), English-born Jamaican footballer
- Walter Benjamin (1892–1940), German philosopher, literary critic and writer
- Zoe Benjamin (1882–1962), born Sophia Benjamin, Australian early childhood educator

=== Fictional characters ===
- Judy Benjamin, main character in the 1980 film Private Benjamin

== See also ==
- Benjamin (disambiguation)
- Benjamina (name)
