= Benjamina (name) =

- Gender: Female

Origin
- Word/name: בִּנְיָמִין Binyāmīn
- Meaning: "Son of my right hand."

Benjamina is a feminine given name and may refer to:

- Benjamina Karić (1991), Bosnian politician
- Benjamina Miyar (1888–1961), Spanish photographer, watchmaker and member of the Spanish anti-fascist resistance

== See also ==
- Benjamin (name)
- Benjaminas
