= Vinylcyclopropane (5+2) cycloaddition =

Chemical reaction

Vinylcyclopropane (5+2) cycloaddition is a type of cycloaddition between a vinylcyclopropane (VCP) and an olefin or alkyne to form a seven-membered ring.

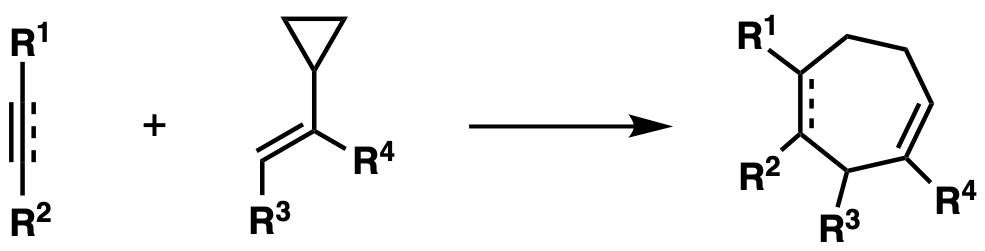

Examples of thermal VCP (5+2) cycloaddition are relatively rare, but still feasible in certain cases. However, vinylcyclopropanes readily undergo formal (5+2) processes catalyzed by transition metal complexes. Since the initial report of a rhodium-catalyzed VCP (5+2) cycloaddition from Paul A. Wender's research group, other reaction protocols have been developed with transition metal complexes of rhodium, ruthenium, iron, nickel, iridium and other metals.

== Mechanism ==
=== Thermal reactions ===
Vinylcyclopropanes can undergo formal (5+2) cycloadditions with highly activated dienophiles such as tetracyanoethylene (TCNE). The proposed reaction mechanism involves an initial [2+2] cycloaddition between the vinylcyclopropane and TCNE, followed by rearrangement to furnish the seven-membered ring in the product. Evidences have shown that depending on the reaction conditions, the rearrangement step can occur via either radical or ionic intermediates.

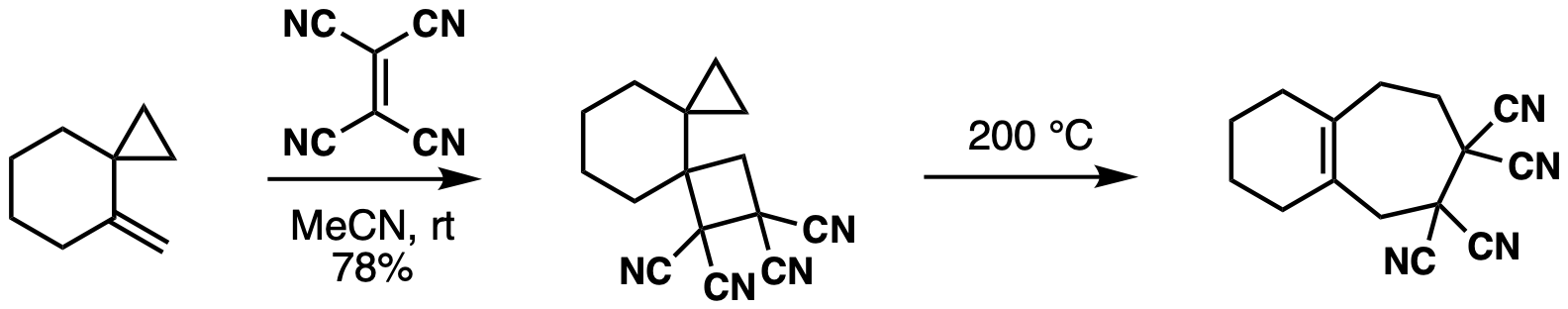

Facile (5+2) cycloaddition is also observed when the vinylcyclopropane moiety is part of a strained heterobicyclic system. A zwitterionic intermediate is proposed for this reaction.

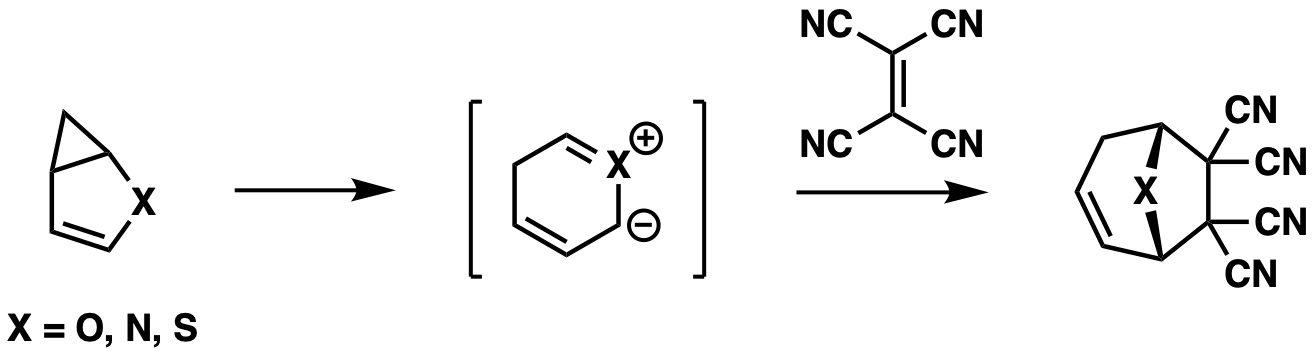

=== Metal-Catalyzed reactions ===
==== Rhodium-catalyzed reactions ====
In his initial disclosure, Paul Wender proposed a cyclometalation mechanism for Rh-catalyzed VCP (5+2) cycloaddition, which is similar to Trost's mechanistic proposal for Ru-catalyzed reactions (see next section). However, DFT calculation studies by Kendall Houk and co-workers suggested a different mode of action in intermolecular cases. The Rh-VCP complex first undergoes a C-C bond activation event to form a rhodium π-allyl complex, a process that can be best visualized as the conceptual equivalent of cyclometalation with a diene. Subsequent alkyne coordination followed by 1,2-migratory insertion and reductive elimination affords the heptadiene product.

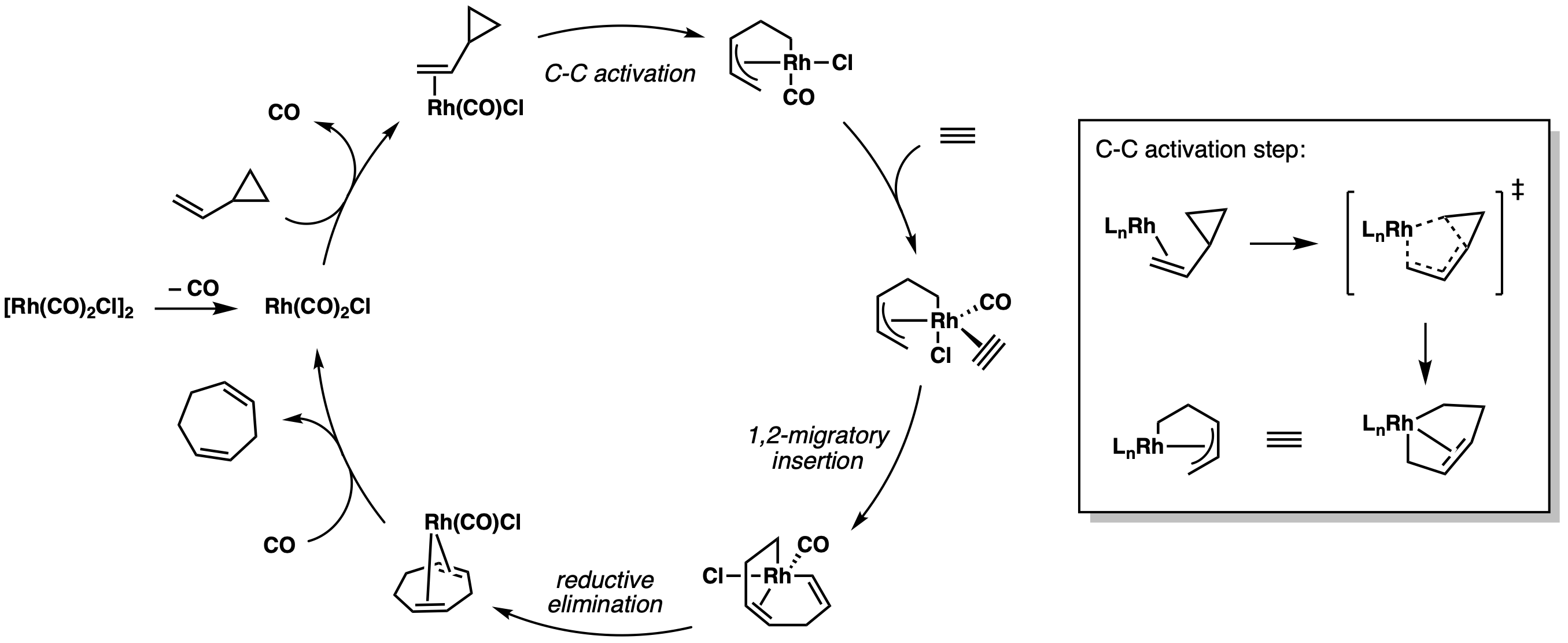

==== Ruthenium-catalyzed reactions ====
Barry M. Trost and co-workers proposed a mechanism for Ru-catalyzed VCP (5+2) cycloaddition that is slightly different from its rhodium counterpart. Cyclometalation of the ruthenium complex with the enyne takes place first to form a ruthenacyclopentene intermediate with a pendant cyclopropane ring. Subsequent C-C bond activation, which can be viewed as conceptually analogous to tautomerization of metal π-allyl complexes, and reductive elimination afford the final product.

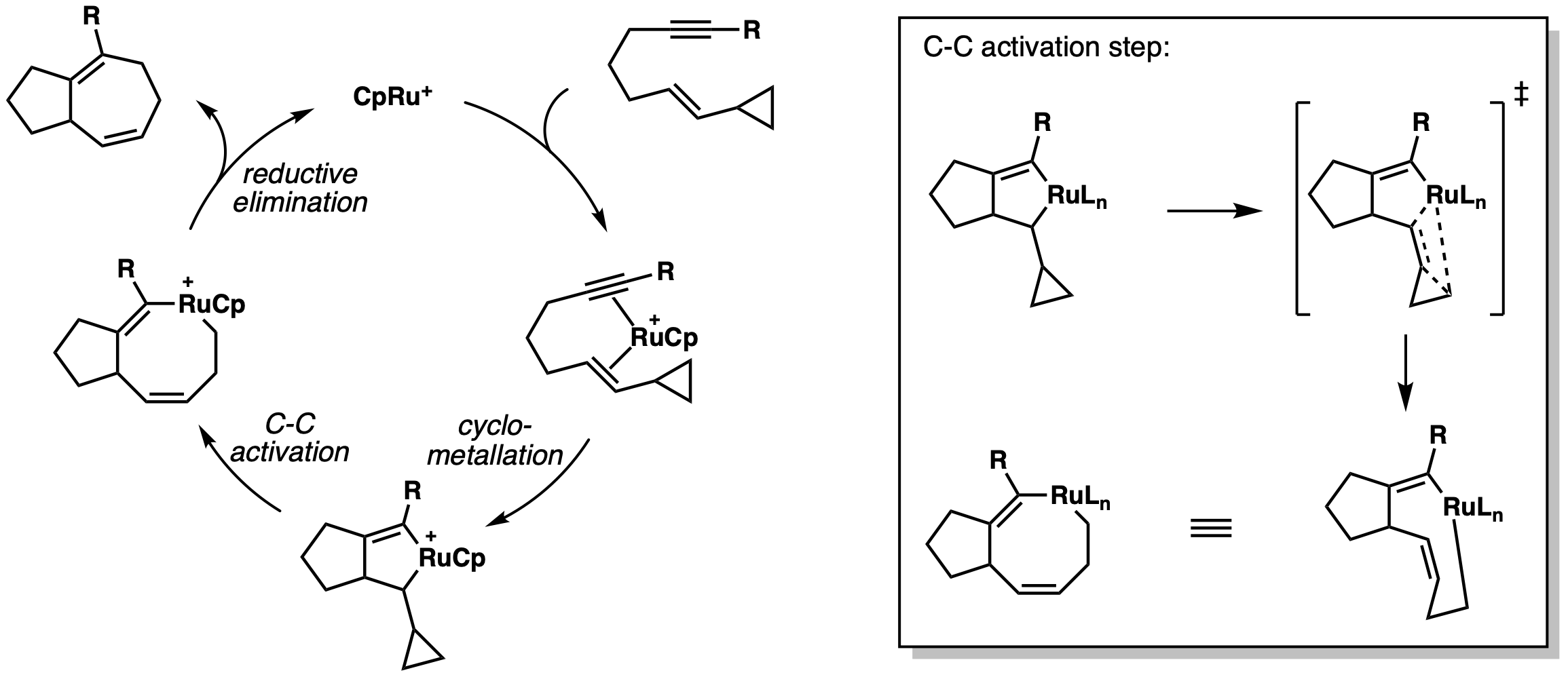

== Reaction scope ==
Intramolecular (5+2) cycloaddition of VCP with a tethered alkyne, alkene, or allene have been reported.

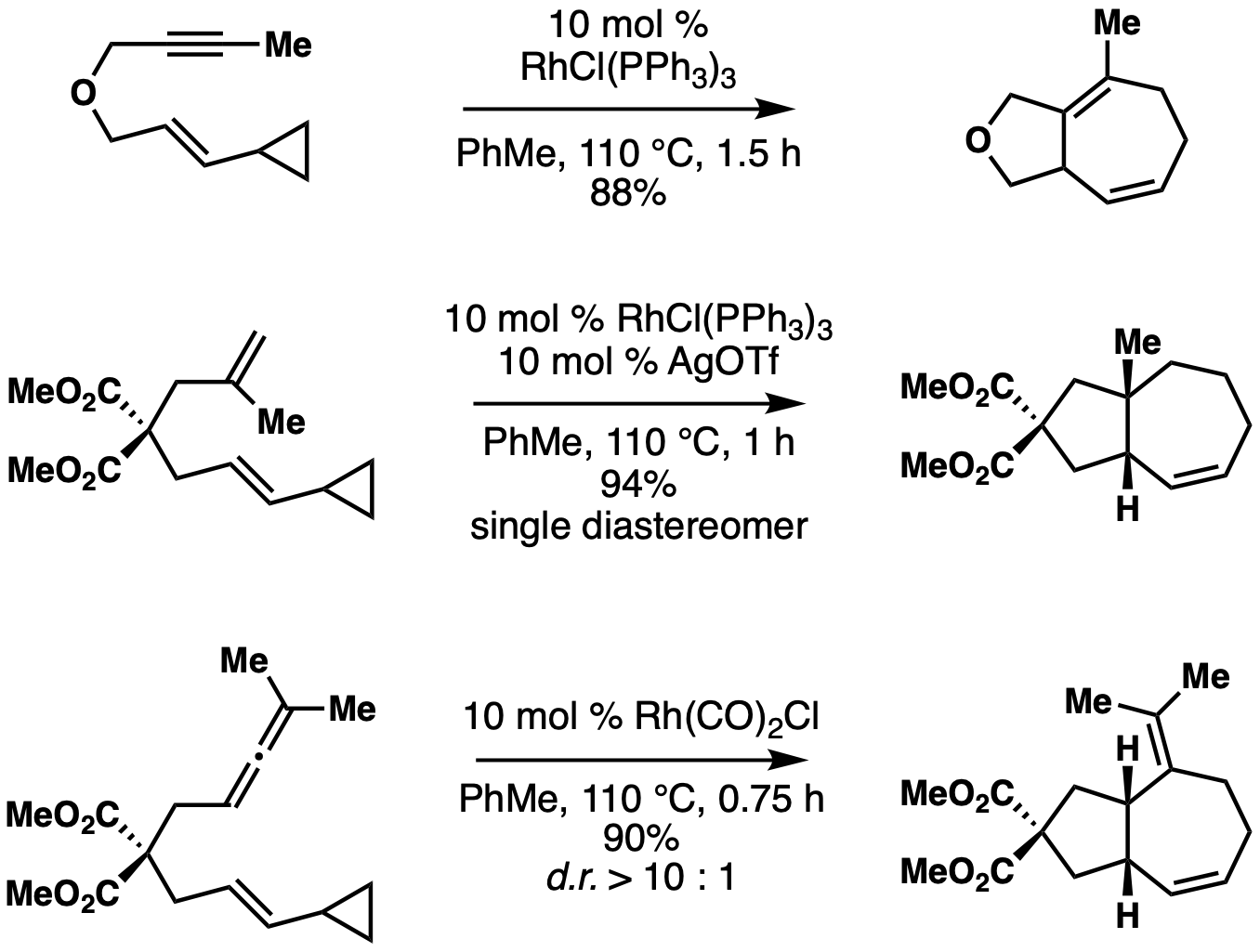

Examples of intermolecular VCP cycloaddition with alkynes were also reported. However, a heteroatom substituent (e.g. a siloxy group) or a sterically bulky group on the vinylcyclopropane is usually required.

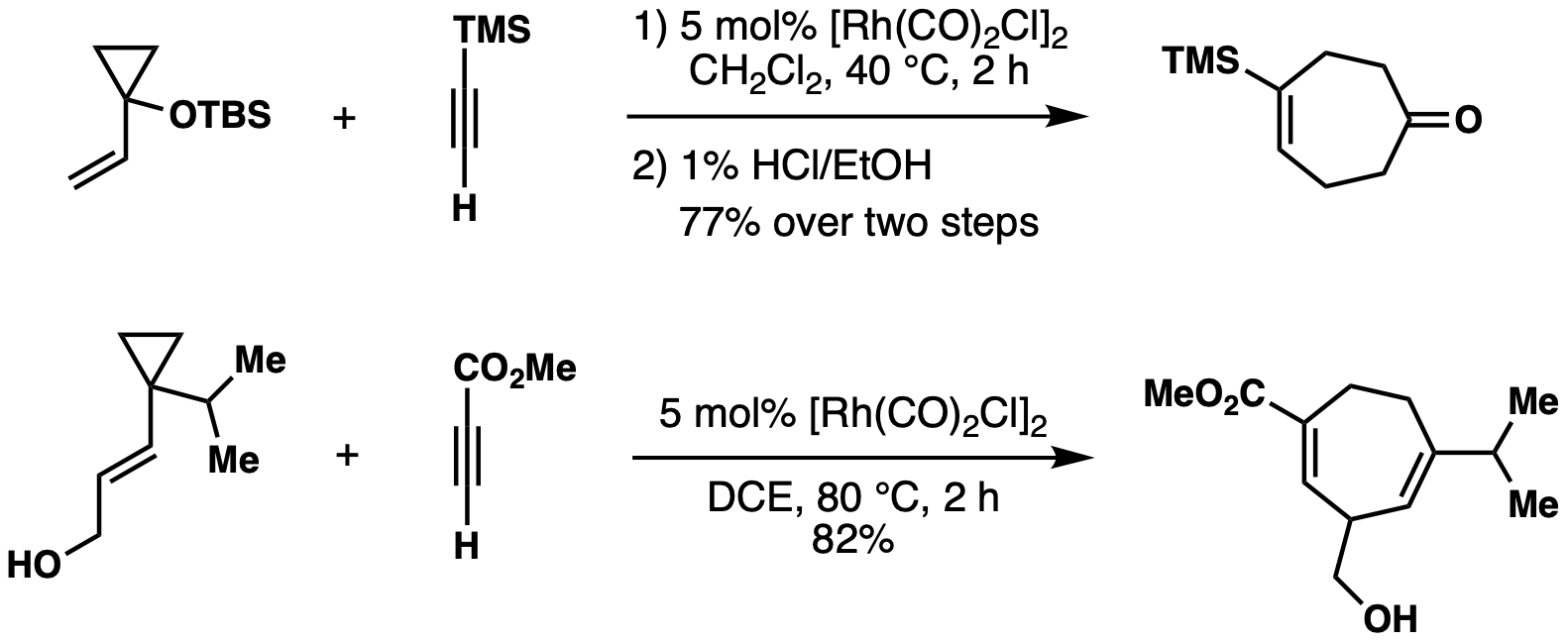

== Other variants ==
=== Asymmetric (5+2) cycloaddition ===
An enantioselective version of the reaction was reported by Wender et al in 2005, featuring a Rh-BINAP catalyst that induces up to >99% enantiomeric excess.

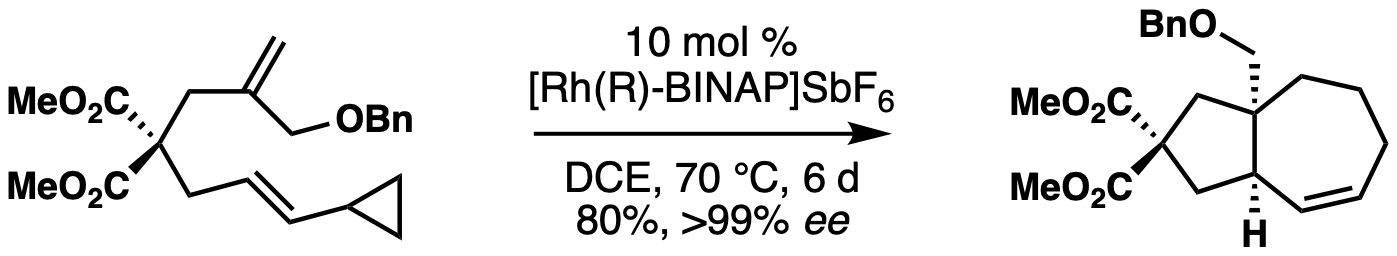

=== Bridged (5+2) cycloaddition ===
Yu and co-workers reported a unique variant of the reaction that preferentially forms bridged bicyclic compounds.

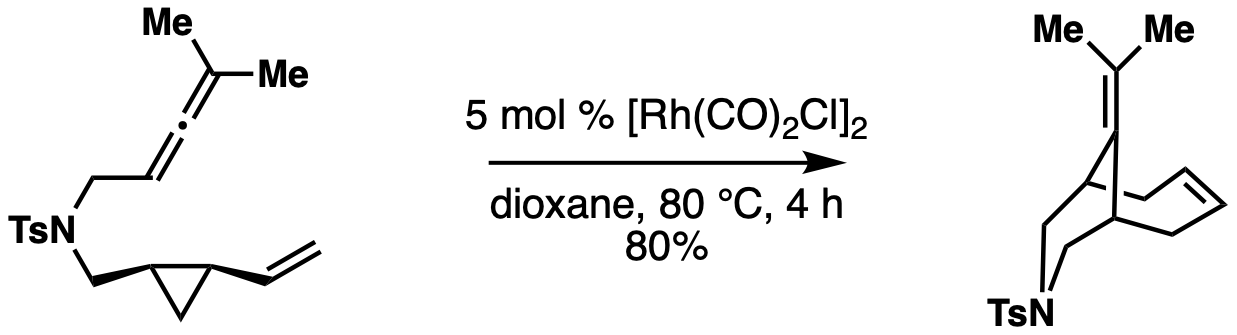

=== Tandem allylic alkylation/(5+2) cycloaddition ===
Martin and co-workers developed an allylic alkylation/(5+2) cycloaddition sequence that forms the enyne precursor in situ with Tsuji-Trost allylic substitution chemistry.

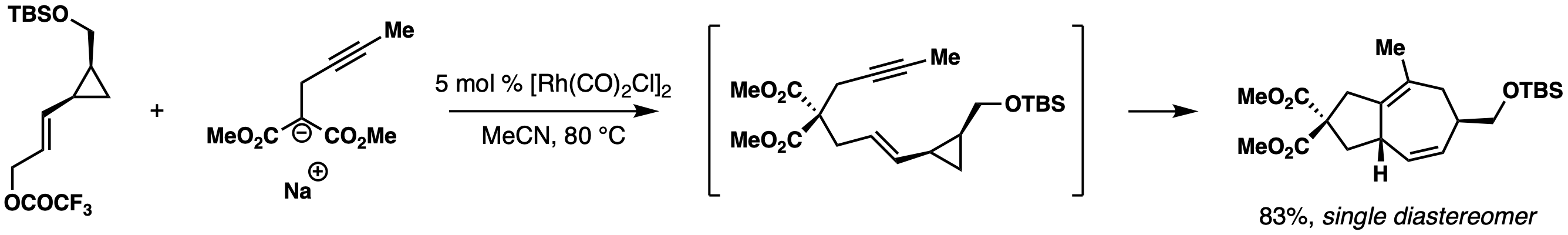

== Applications in total syntheses ==
Metal-catalyzed VCP (5+2) cycloaddition has found applications in the total syntheses of a variety of molecules such as (+)-dictamnol, (+)-aphanamol I, (+)-allocyathin B_{2} (–)-pseudolaric acid B, and (+)-frondosin A.

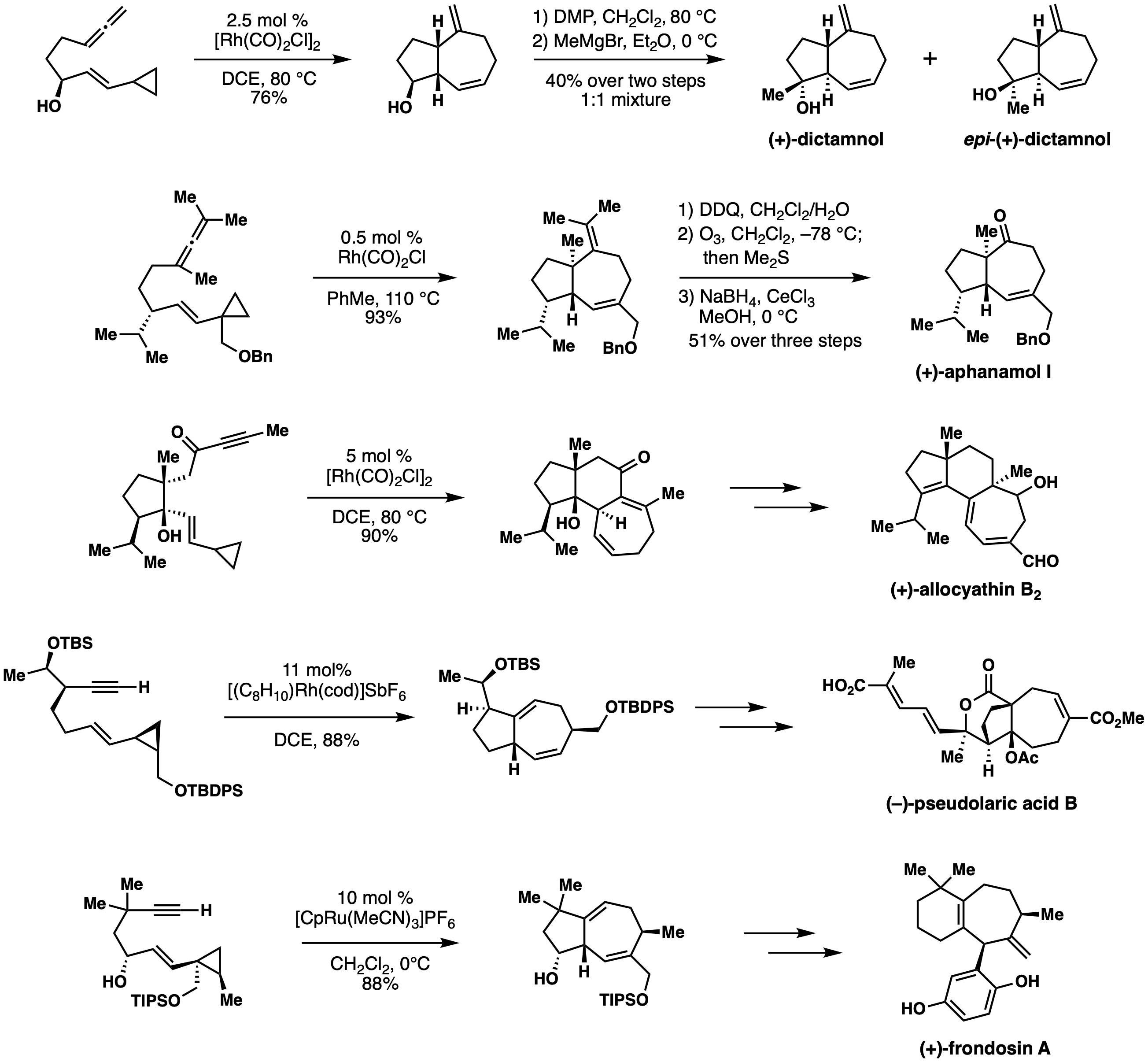

== See also ==
- Cycloaddition
- Cyclopropane
- Vinylcyclopropane rearrangement
