= Benjamin Gung =

Chinese American academic

Benjamin W. Gung (born July 15, 1953) is a Chinese American organic chemist and academic. He is an emeritus Professor of Chemistry at Miami University.

Gung and his research group have concentrated on two main areas: organic synthesis, including the total synthesis of natural products and the development of new methodologies, and the study of nonbonding interactions involving aromatic rings. Together, they have synthesized a variety of natural products.

Gung is ranked among the top 2 percent of researchers worldwide, according to a recent Stanford University study that used citation analysis to identify leading scholars among nearly eight million authors.

== Education and career ==
After receiving a bachelor's degree in chemistry from Nanjing University in China in 1982, Gung pursued graduate studies in organic chemistry at Kansas State University, where he completed his M.S. in 1984 and Ph.D. in 1987, studying under Richard McDonald and Duy Hua. Following a two-year postdoctoral appointment at the University of South Carolina under James Marshall, he joined the faculty at Miami University, in Oxford, Ohio in 1989. He was promoted to associate professor in 1994 and Full Professor in 2003, and during his tenure there, he spent his sabbatical leave doing research in the group of William Roush at the University of Michigan in 1999. Since 2024, he has been serving as an emeritus Professor.

Gung has supervised graduate and undergraduate students in chemistry research. He has held key roles, including serving as a reviewer for five NSF-Career Applications in 2004 and organizing an NSF-sponsored REU program at Miami University from 2004 to 2006. He also reviewed NIH Fellowship Study Sections from 2006 to 2011 and was a Co-PI on an NSF-DUE project from 2011 to 2014. After retiring in 2024, he continues collaborating with undergraduate students on research, with his publication, co-authored with Miami University students, focusing on amino acids and peptides as effective ligands for metal-centered catalysts

== Research ==
Gung has made contributions to the field of organic chemistry, with over 100 published journal articles. His research interests include stereochemistry in organic reactions, non-covalent molecular interactions, methods development, and computational chemistry. He is known for his studies in stereochemical mechanism and in the development of a Transannular [4+3] cycloaddition reaction with gold-stabilized allylic carbocations as reactive intermediate.

== Selected articles ==
- Gung, B. W. (1996). Diastereofacial selection in nucleophilic additions to unsymmetrically substituted trigonal carbons. Tetrahedron, 52(15), 5263–5301.
- Gung, B. W. (1999). Structure distortions in heteroatom-substituted cyclohexanones, adamantanones, and adamantanes: Origin of diastereofacial selectivity. Chemical reviews, 99(5), 1377–1386.
- Gung, B. W., Xue, X., & Reich, H. J. (2005). The strength of parallel-displaced arene− arene interactions in chloroform. The Journal of Organic Chemistry, 70(9), 3641–3644.
- Gung, B. W., Patel, M., & Xue, X. (2005). A threshold for charge transfer in aromatic interactions? A quantitative study of π-stacking interactions. The Journal of Organic Chemistry, 70(25), 10532–10537.
- Gung, B. W., & Amicangelo, J. C. (2006). Substituent Effects in C_{6}F_{6} C_{6}H_{5}X Stacking Interactions. The Journal of organic chemistry, 71(25), 9261–9270.
- Gung, B. W., Zou, Y., Xu, Z., Amicangelo, J. C., Irwin, D. G., Ma, S., & Zhou, H. C. (2008). Quantitative study of interactions between oxygen lone pair and aromatic rings: Substituent effect and the importance of closeness of contact. The Journal of Organic Chemistry, 73(2), 689–693.
