= John Benjamin =

John Benjamin may refer to:

- John F. Benjamin (1817–1877), U.S. Representative from Missouri
- John F. Benjamin (Medal of Honor), American Civil War soldier and Medal of Honor recipient
- John Oponjo Benjamin (born 1952), Sierra Leonean economist and politician
- John Toshack (born 1949), full name John Benjamin Toshack, Welsh footballer and football manager, known as John Benjamin in Spain

== See also ==
- Jon Benjamin (disambiguation)
