= Metal-centered cycloaddition reactions =

Type of chemical reaction

A metal-centered cycloaddition is a subtype of the more general class of cycloaddition reactions. In such reactions "two or more unsaturated molecules unite directly to form a ring", incorporating a metal bonded to one or more of the molecules. Cycloadditions involving metal centers are a staple of organic and organometallic chemistry, and are involved in many industrially-valuable synthetic processes.

There are two general types of metal-centered cycloaddition reactions: those in which the metal is incorporated into the cycle (a metallocycle), and those in which the metal is external to the cycle. These can be further divided into "true" cycloadditions (those that take place in a concerted fashion), and formal cycloadditions (those that take place in a stepwise fashion). Beyond that, they are classified by the number of atoms contributed to the cycle by each of the participants.

For example, olefin metathesis using a Grubbs catalyst typically involves a reversible [2+2] cycloaddition. A Ruthenium alkylidene and an alkene (or alkyne) react to form a metallocycle.

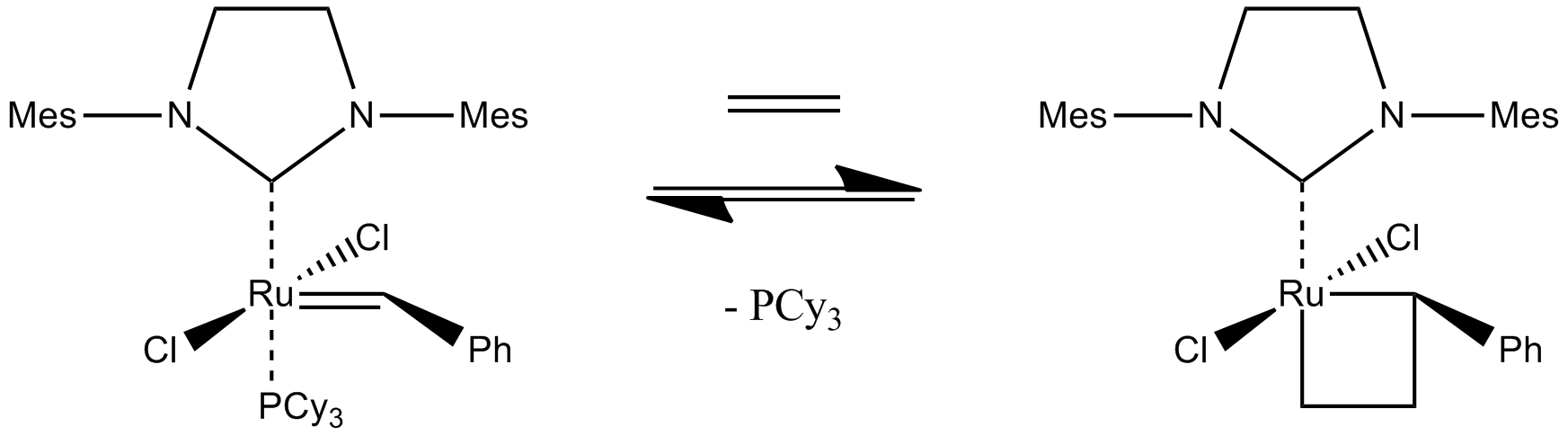
[2+2] cycloaddition of Grubbs catalyst with Ethene

== Roles of metals in cycloaddition reactions ==
=== Conformational control ===
A common role for a metal centre in cycloaddition reactions is to exert control over the conformation of the reactants. Metal ions are frequently a component of 1,3-dipolar cycloadditions, and Diels-Alder reactions. A Lewis acidic can coerce a Diene into the reactive cisoid conformation, thereby catalyzing the reaction the Diels-Alder reaction.

A crucial role of the metal in many cycloadditions reactions is to bind simultaneously to the reactants. This brings them into close proximity and encourages them to cyclize. The ligands associated with the metal can direct the approach of the reactants, providing control over regiochemistry and stereochemistry.

=== Stabilization of reactive species ===
Cycloadditions that require unstable synthons such as carbanions or carbenes are often possible using organometallic compounds. Several synthetic routes to cyclopropyl and cyclopropenyl compounds involve the cycloaddition of a metal carbene to an alkene or alkyne. Metal-stabilized allyl and pentadienyl complexes are used in [4+3] and [5+2] cycloadditions for preparing seven-membered rings.

=== Metallocycles ===
Alkylidenes and other carbene analogs participate readily in cycloaddition reactions. Cycloaddition reactions of Ruthenium phosphinidenes with alkenes and alkynes is an active area research and has promise as catalytic cycle for hydrophosphination.

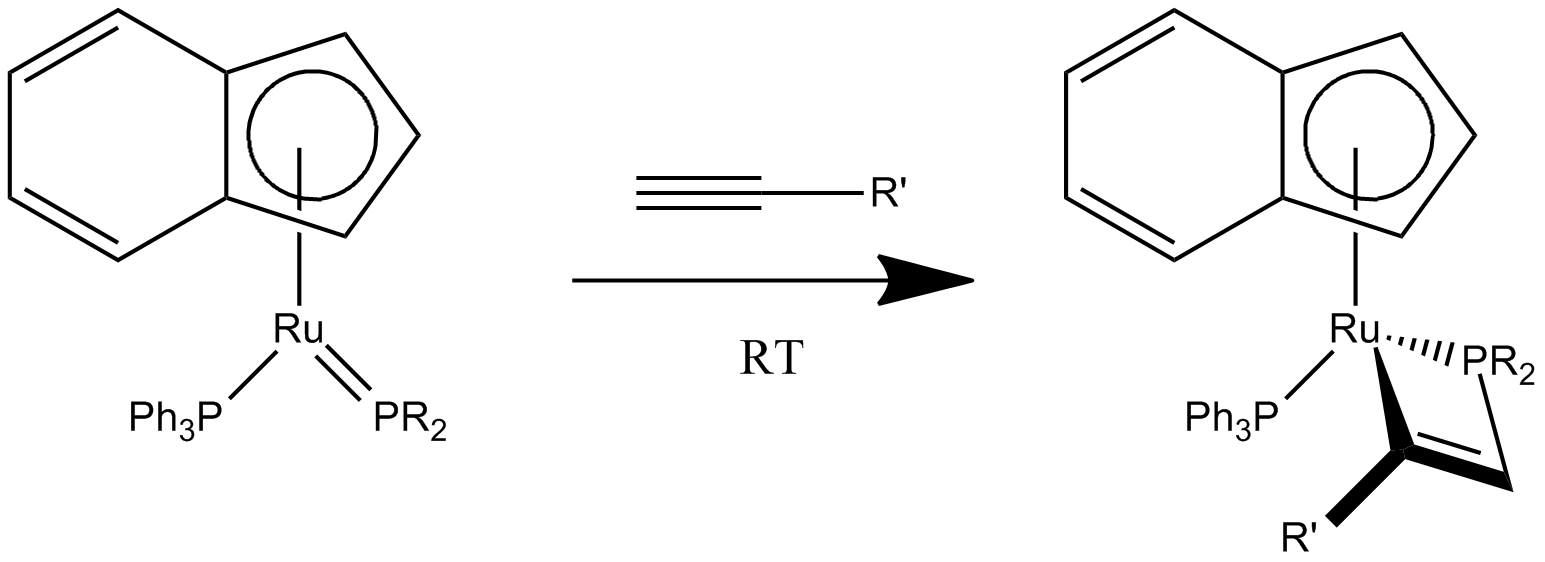
Cycloaddition of a Ruthenium phosphinidene with an alkyne

== Molecular orbital explanation ==
Underlying any attempt to explain cycloaddition reactions is Frontier Molecular Orbital Theory, which describes the interaction between the Highest Occupied Molecular Orbital (HOMO) and the Lowest Unoccupied Molecular Orbital (LUMO) of the reactants. A cycloaddition will only proceed if the HOMO and LUMO have an allowed symmetry and are similar in energy. Metals play a crucial role in cycloaddition reactions because they can bind to unsaturated molecules, changing the symmetries and energy levels of the HOMO and/or LUMO. The Woodward-Hoffmann rules and Green-Davies-Mingos rules can provide some indication of the effects of metal-bonding on cycloaddition reactions.

As an example, free Benzene is extremely unreactive in cycloadditions due to its aromaticity. Coordination of Benzene to a highly reduced Tricarbonylmanganese centre allows the Benzene to undergo cycloaddition with Diphenylketene.

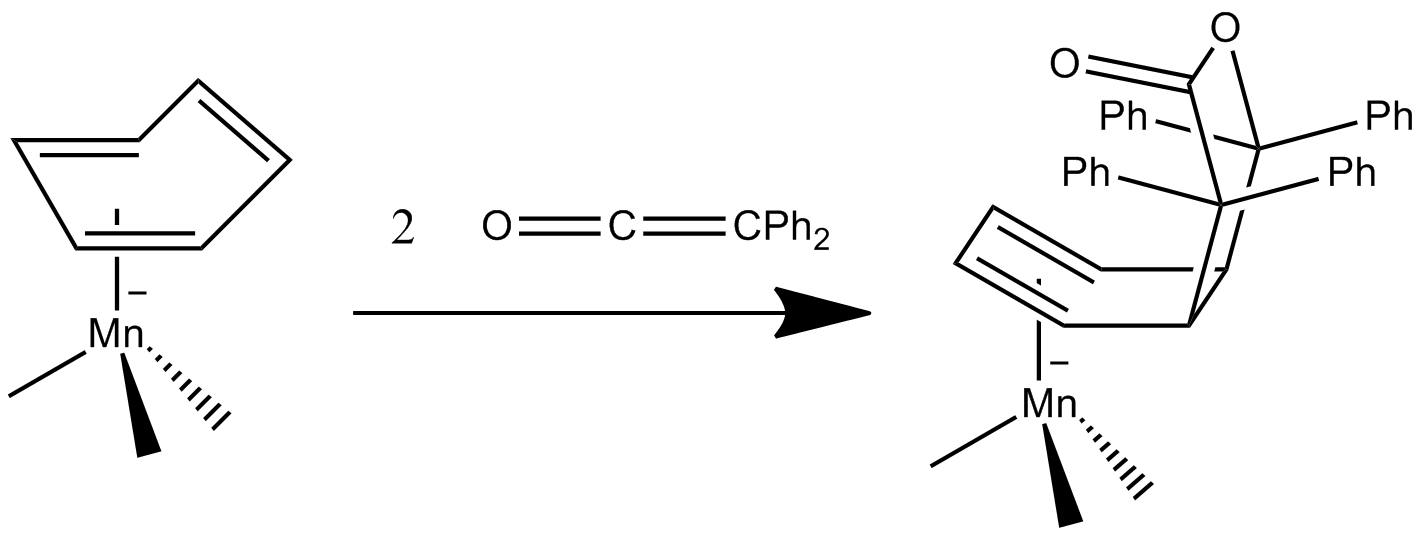
Cycloaddition of η^{6}-Benzyltricarbonylmanganate and two equivalents of Diphenylketene

== Examples ==
=== [2+2] cycloaddition of two alkynes ===
Although cyclobutadienes can only exist briefly in the free state, they can exist indefinitely as metal ligands. They can be formed as ligands in-situ by the [2+2] cycloaddition of sterically bulky alkynes bound to a metal.

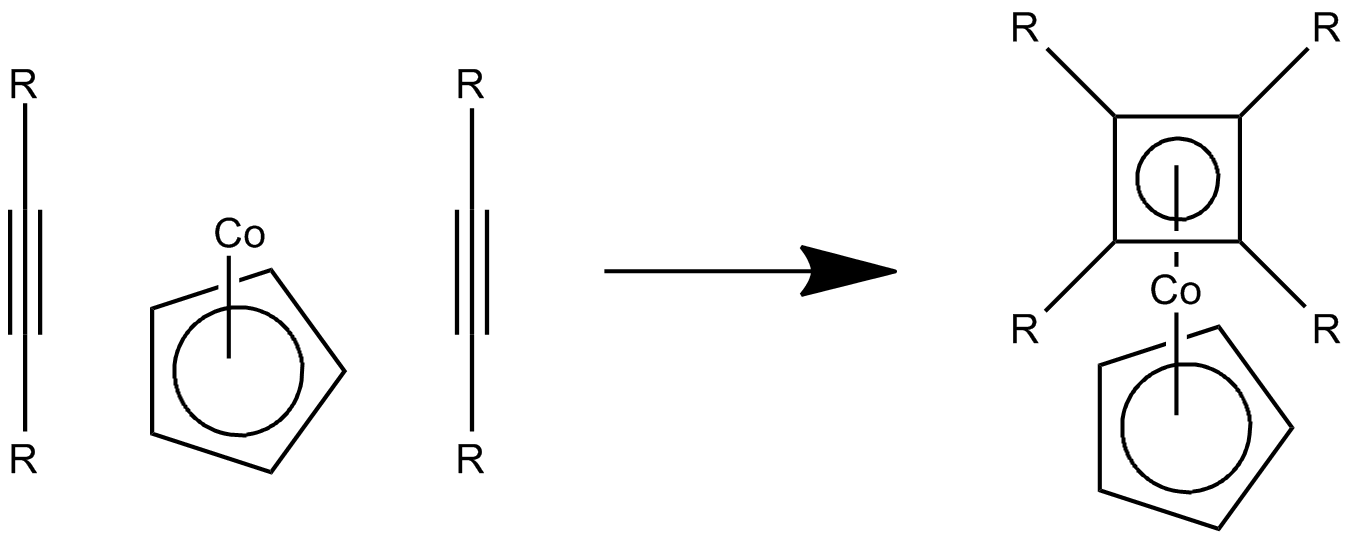
[2+2] cycloaddition of two internal alkynes at a Cobalt centre

=== Benzannulation ===
The Dötz reaction is a formal [3+2+1] cycloaddition of two alkynes, a carbene, and a carbonyl ligand to form a benzene ring.

The Dötz reaction

=== Formal [5+4] cycloaddition ===
An unusual formal [5+4] cycloaddition was reported by Kreiter et al. Nine-membered rings are unusual and only a handful of synthetic routes to rings of this size are known.

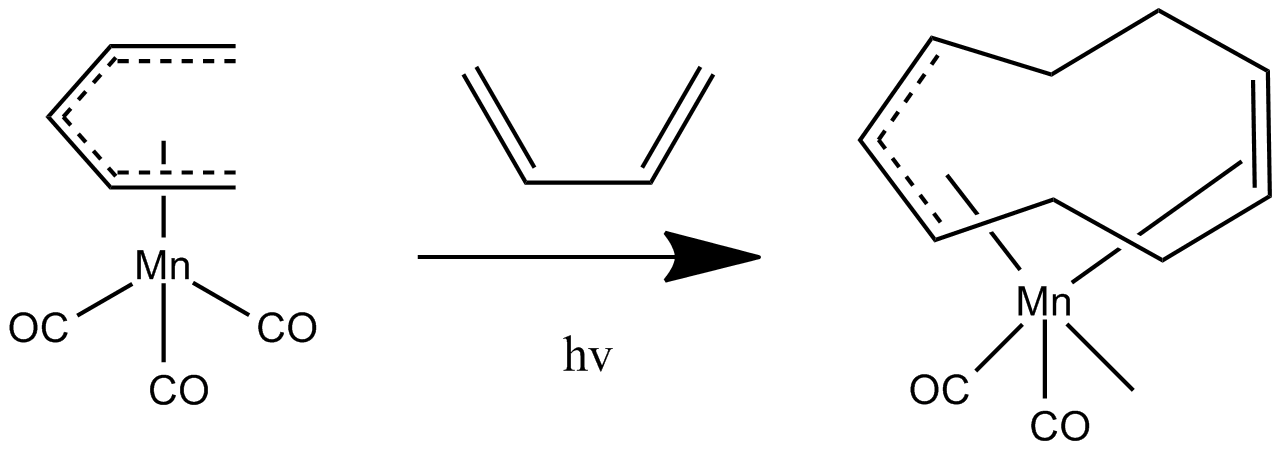
Photocatalyzed [5+4] cycloaddition

== See also ==
- Cycloaddition reaction
- Frontier Molecular Orbital Theory
- Organometallic chemistry
- Pericyclic reaction
- 1,3-Dipolar cycloaddition
- Diels-Alder reaction
