= Benjamin Lee =

Benjamin Lee may refer to:

- Benjamin Lee (footballer) (born 1989), Danish footballer
- Benjamin Lee (Australian politician) (1825–1917), English-born Australian politician
- Benjamin F. Lee (1841–1926), American religious leader and educator
- Benjamin W. Lee (1935–1977), Korean-American physicist
- Benjamin Lee (academic), professor of anthropology and philosophy at the New School
- Benjamin Lee (general) (1774–1828), American military leader and political figure
- Ben Lee (born 1978), Australian musician and actor
- Ben Lee (violinist) (born 1980), British electric violinist and composer
- Benny Lee (1916–1995), British comedy actor and singer

== See also ==
- Benjamin W. Leigh (1781–1849), American lawyer and politician
- Benjamin Lees (1924–2010), composer
