= 4+4 Photocycloaddition =

Chemical reaction

The [4+4] Photocycloaddition is a cycloaddition reaction in which two unsaturated molecules connect via four atoms from each molecule (hence "4 + 4") to create an eight-membered ring. As a photochemical reaction, it is promoted by some form of light, as opposed to a thermal process.

== Introduction ==
The earliest example of a [4+4] photocycloaddition was the photodimerization of anthracene, discovered in 1936. This reaction has remained one of the most reliable photocycloadditions and is the basis of continuing investigation.

Anthracene photodimerization

Other polycyclic aromatics undergo anthracene-like photocycloaddition, such as acridizinium salts. Biologically active natural products include pleuromutilin, kalmanol, crenulide, and longipenol.

[4+4] photocycloaddition approaches to the creation of cyclooctanoid systems offer several appealing features, including convergent assembly of the eight-membered ring from two relatively simpler four-carbon fragments, formation of two new carbon-carbon bonds, and the potential for introduction of up to four new stereocenters in one step.

== Mechanism and stereochemistry ==
=== Prevailing mechanism ===
[4+4] reactions are forbidden in the ground state and often entropically disfavored in the excited state. The mechanism of the [4+4] photocycloaddition is proposed to begin with the photoexcitation of a 1,3-diene system into the excited state. Because the orbital symmetry of the highest occupied molecular orbital (HOMO) in the excited diene is the same as that of the lowest unoccupied molecular orbital (LUMO) in another ground state diene, they are able to form an exciplex that decays to form the closed cyclooctane ring structure. Below is a Frontier Molecular Orbital diagram depicting the interaction between the two molecules of dienes.

FMO Orbital Theory depiction of a 4+4 photocycloaddition.

=== Stereochemistry ===
Stereochemical control within [4+4] reactions is not common, however it does exist. Enol-exo stereoselectivity is possible using certain cross-linking techniques and has been met with moderate success.

English: 4-mesyloxypyran-2-ones with pendent furans occurred with high exo selectivity, displaying stereochemical control exists in 4+4 photocycloaddition reactions.

Control over the configuration at newly established bridgehead centers by use of preexisting stereocenters has been largely unsuccessful, apart from one specialized example.

== Synthetic applications ==
Application of the [4+4] photocycloaddition is scarce because of competition with the [2+2] cycloaddition. However, when accessible, this method can be used to build 8-membered ring with complex stereocenters and structures in one step, as is seen in proposed syntheses for Taxol and molecules of the fusicoccin family. Additionally, while this reaction first forms fused rings, subsequent cleavages can afford macrocycles.

Forming the BC rings of Taxol

In this partial synthesis of the BC rings of Taxol, the framework buildup utilized an intramolecule [4+4] photocycloaddition of a relatively linear and simple 2-pyridone derivative, folding it into the desired fused rings with correct stereochemistry at C3, C8, and C15 (compare with Taxol on the right) and two double bonds on the B ring ready to accept trans-addition. Consequent lactam-ring opening and functionalization were expected to give Taxol.

Wrong isomer

Similarly, molecules of the fusicoccin family, featuring 5-8-5 ring systems, could be constructed rapidly using this reaction. Although the high stereoselectivity of this reaction to form trans-isomers made it unsuitable for the specific target molecules, the general ease to create the four tertiary chiral centers is still noteworthy.

Creating an eleven-membered ring by reduction of 8+5 fused rings

Use of [4+4] photocycloaddition need not be limited to the creation of 8-membered rings. By linking up a network of rings and then breaking the shared bonds, a single macrocycle with built-in stereocenters could be achieved.

== Limitations ==
Inevitably, [4+4] photocycloadditions carry the side reaction of [2+2] photocycloadditions. However, since these reactions are reversible, the most stable product may be formed through thermodynamic control.

A 4+4 cycloaddition occurring over two 2+2 cycloaddition steps.

== See also ==
- [2+2] Photocycloaddition
