= Benjamin Zendel =

Canadian psychologist

Benjamin Zendel is a Canadian psychologist, currently a Canada Research Chair in Aging and Auditory Neuroscience at Memorial University. He is the PI for the Cognitive Aging and Auditory Neuroscience Laboratory
