= Jon Benjamin =

Jon Benjamin may refer to:

- Jon Benjamin (Jewish leader) (born 1964), British lawyer, former chief executive of the Board of Deputies of British Jews
- Jon Benjamin (diplomat) (born 1963), British diplomat
- H. Jon Benjamin (born 1966), American actor and comedian

== See also ==
- John Benjamin (disambiguation)
