= Benjamin Miskowitsch =

German politician (born 1984)

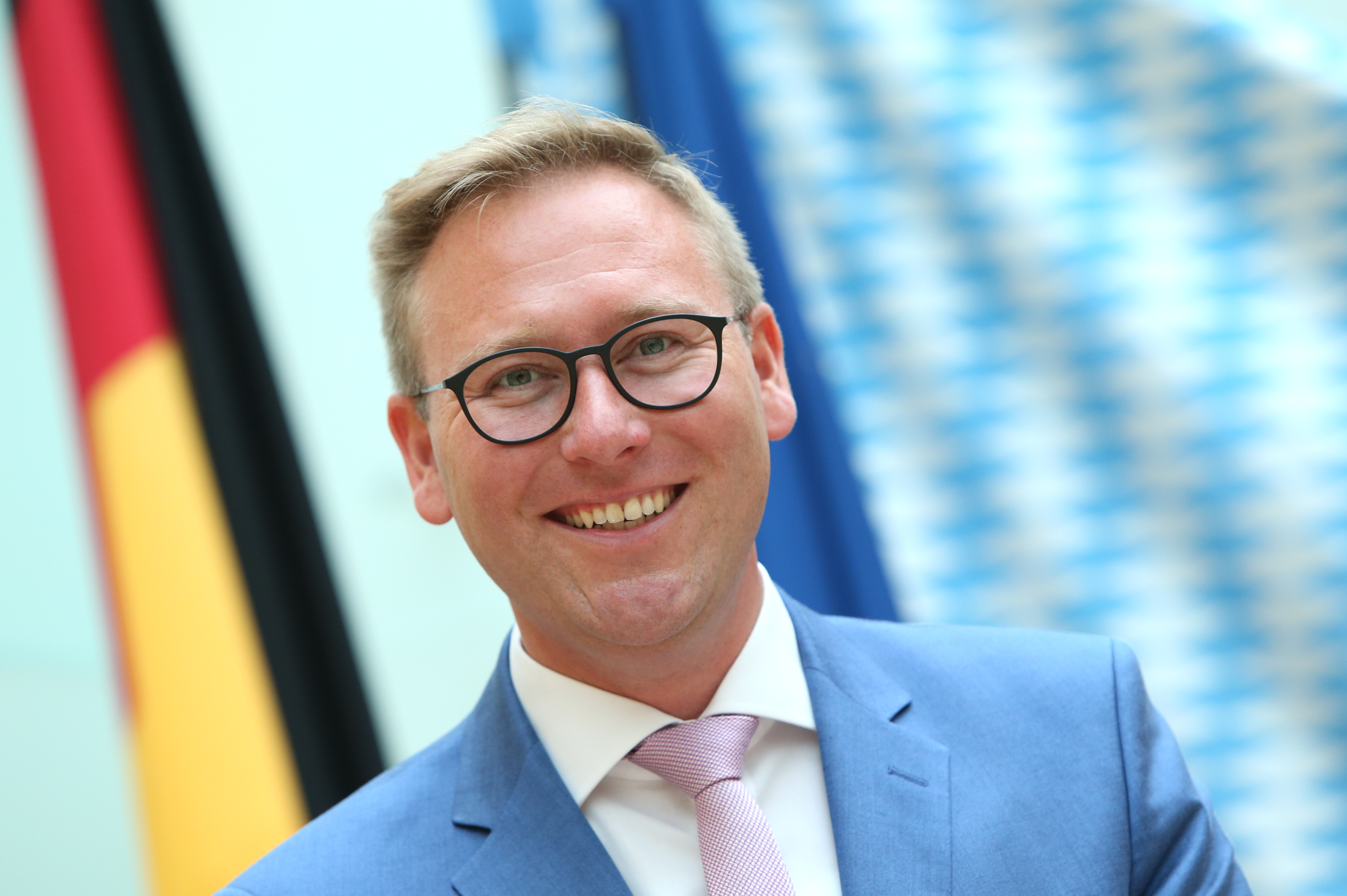
- Miskowitsch in 2020

Member of the Landtag of Bavaria
- Incumbent
- Assumed office 5 November 2018
- Constituency: Fürstenfeldbruck-Ost

Personal details
- Born: 24 September 1984 (age 41) Munich
- Party: Christian Social Union (since 2005)

Benjamin Miskowitsch (born 24 September 1984 in Munich) is a German politician serving as a member of the Landtag of Bavaria since 2013. He has been a municipal councillor of Mammendorf since 2008, and a district councillor of Fürstenfeldbruck since 2014.
