= Rick Benjamin =

Rick Benjamin may refer to:

- Rick Benjamin (announcer) (born 1952), American motor racing announcer
- Rick Benjamin (conductor), American bandleader, director and founder of The Paragon Ragtime Orchestra
- Rick Benjamin (trombonist), trombonist and contributor to numerous Elephant 6 Recording Co. albums
- Rick Benjamin (writer), American poet from Rhode Island

== See also ==
- Richard Benjamin (born 1938), American actor and film director
