= Benjaminas =

Benjaminas is a masculine Lithuanian given name and may refer to:

- Benjaminas Jakševičius (1895–1979), Lithuanian sculptor and partisan
- Benjaminas Viluckis (born 1961), Lithuanian hammer thrower
- Benjaminas Zelkevičius (born 1944), Lithuanian footballer and manager
