= Benjamin Lee (academic) =

Benjamin Lee is a professor of anthropology and philosophy at The New School, where he also served as provost from 2006 until 2008. Lee's primary academic interests include contemporary China; the cultural dimensions of globalization, particularly the effects of global financial flows; and modern theories of language.

Lee graduated from Johns Hopkins University with a BA in psychology and later attended the University of Chicago, where he received an MA in human development and a PhD in anthropology.

== Selected publications ==
- From Primitives to Derivatives (coauthor, 2004)
- Derivatives and the Globalization of Risk (coauthor, 2004)
- "The Subjects of Circulation," in U. Hedetoft and M. Hjort (Eds.)
- The Postnational Self: Belonging and Identity (2002)
- "Cultures of Circulation: The Imaginations of Modernity," Public Culture (coauthor, 2002)
- "Peoples and Publics," Public Culture (1998)
- Talking Heads: Language, Metalanguage, and the Semiotics of Subjectivity (1997)
- "Critical Internationalism," Public Culture (1995)
- "Going Public," Public Culture (1993)
- Semiotics, Self, and Society (coeditor, 1989)
- Semiotic Origins of the Mind Body Dualism (in Semiotics, Self, ...)
- Developmental Approaches to the Self (coeditor, 1983)
- Psychosocial Theories of the Self (editor, 1982)
- The Development of Adaptive Intelligence (coauthor, 1974)
