= Eugene S. Benjamin =

Eugene S. Benjmain
- Born: Eugene Simeon Benjamin; January 21, 1862; Leavenworth, Kansas, U.S.
- Died: June 21, 1941 (aged 79)
- Occupations: Business executive; philanthropist
- Spouse: Miriam Gutman (m. 1890)
- Children: 1
- Parent(s): Alfred Benjamin; Sophie Wolf

Eugene Simeon Benjamin (January 21, 1862 – June 21, 1941) was a Jewish-American business executive and philanthropist from New York.

== Life ==
Benjamin was born on January 21, 1862, in Leavenworth, Kansas, the son of Alfred Benjamin and Sophie Wolf. His father was an English immigrant from Birmingham, and his mother was from New York.

Benjamin came to New York City, New York, when he was a child and received a public school education. He began his business career as a clerk when he was fourteen. He became president of the firm Alfred Benjamin and Company, holding that position until 1913. He then served as a partner of I. S. Woolf and Company from 1915 to 1921. He was also a trade advisor for the Irving Bank and Trust Company until 1932. Active in Jewish charitable activities, he served as president of the Baron de Hirsch Fund from 1900 to 1922, after which he became its managing director. He was also president of the Woodbine Land Improvement Company, vice-president of the Jewish Agricultural Society, and a founder of the National Conference of Jewish Charities. In 1933, he wrote Practical Credit Analysis, which became a widely used textbook. He worked as a wholesale clothier and silk manufacturer, bank director, and advisor on commercial credits.

Benjamin was a member of the Ethical Culture Society and the Century Country Club. In 1890, he married Miriam Gutman. They had one child, Alfred.

Benjamin died at home from a long illness on June 21, 1941.
