= Ryan Benjamin =

Ryan Benjamin may refer to:

- Ryan Benjamin (long snapper) (born 1977), American football player
- Ryan Benjamin (running back) (born 1970), American football player
