= Simeon Benjamin =

American businessman and philanthropist

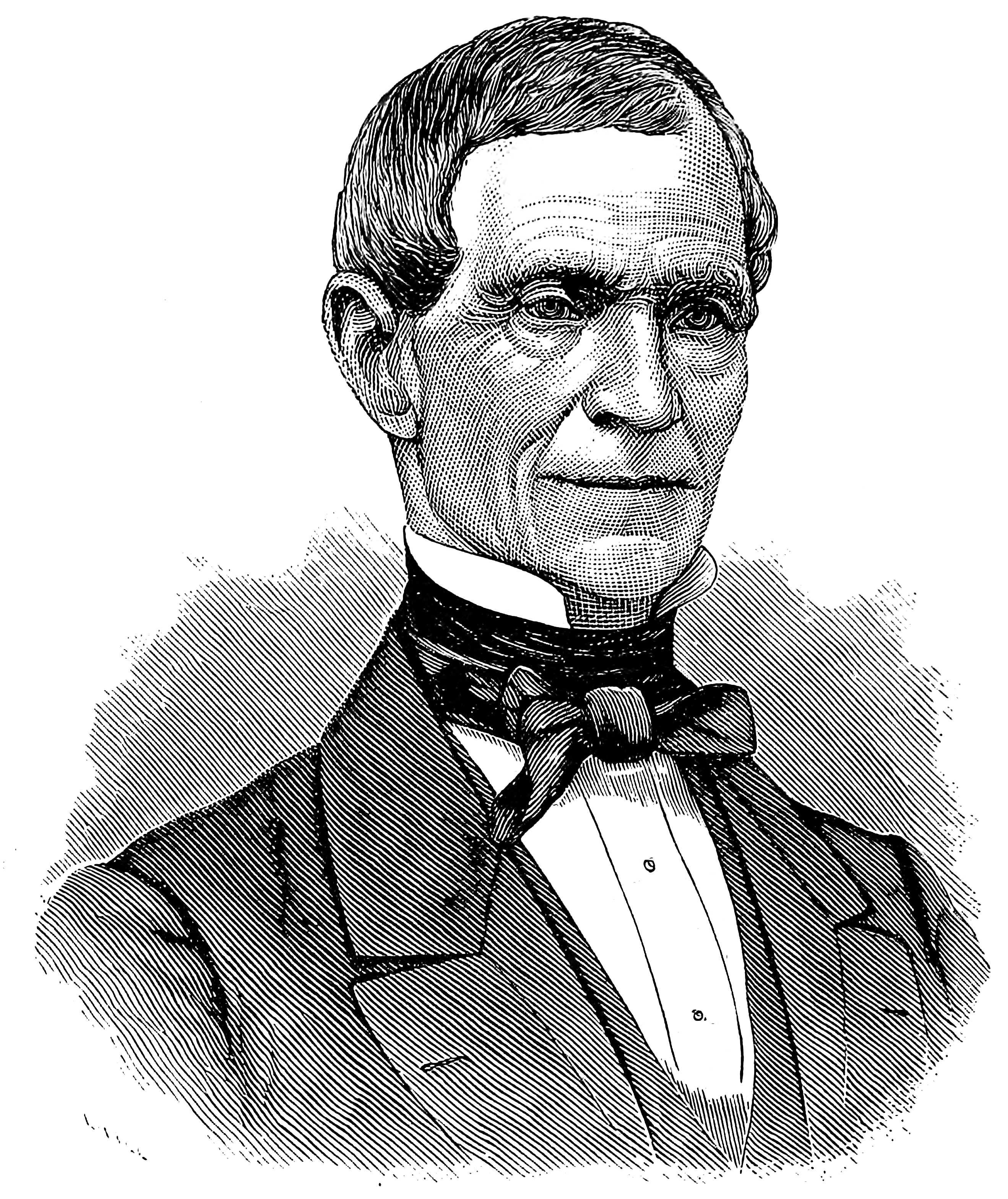
- Born: May 29, 1792; Upper Aquebogue, New York
- Died: September 1, 1868 (aged 76); Upper Aquebogue, New York
- Resting place: Woodlawn Cemetery
- Occupations: Businessman and philanthropist
- Known for: Founder of Elmira College
- Spouse: Sarah Wickham Goldsmith

Simeon Benjamin (May 29, 1792 – September 1, 1868) was a businessman, philanthropist, and founder of Elmira College.

== Early years ==
Simeon Benjamin was born on May 29, 1792, in Upper Aquebogue, in the Town of Riverhead, New York on Long Island. He was the third of eight children.

Because Benjamin was considered a feeble child, he was allowed experience working as a clerk in a country store in Aquebogue. At age 16, he clerked for two years in a store on Broadway in New York City, then at the start of the War of 1812 returned to Aquebogue to open his own dry goods store there. Benjamin prospered during the war, as his location in Riverhead enabled his store to avoid the blockade that otherwise prevented goods from reaching New York.

After the conclusion of the War of 1812, Benjamin returned to New York City where he operated a successful dry goods store at 371 Pearl Street for 20 years.

== Elmira years ==
Benjamin, having made a fortune in New York, moved to Elmira, New York in 1835 and began buying up real estate in town. Benjamin's fortune grew as Elmira expanded. Benjamin built churches, schools, and hotels in town, and helped establish a railroad connection between Elmira and Seneca Lake.

He later became president of the Chemung Railroad, vice president of the Elmira Rolling Mills Company, and president of the Bank of Chemung and the First National Bank. His wealth grew so considerable that he was considered for many years to be the wealthiest person in Chemung County.

During his entire time in Elmira, Benjamin lived at 500 Lake Street, at the corner of East Third Street. At the time it was considered "well out in the country."

Benjamin was active for 30 years in Elmira's First Presbyterian Church; he was a trustee of the church, and became an elder in 1836.

== Philanthropy ==
=== Elmira College ===
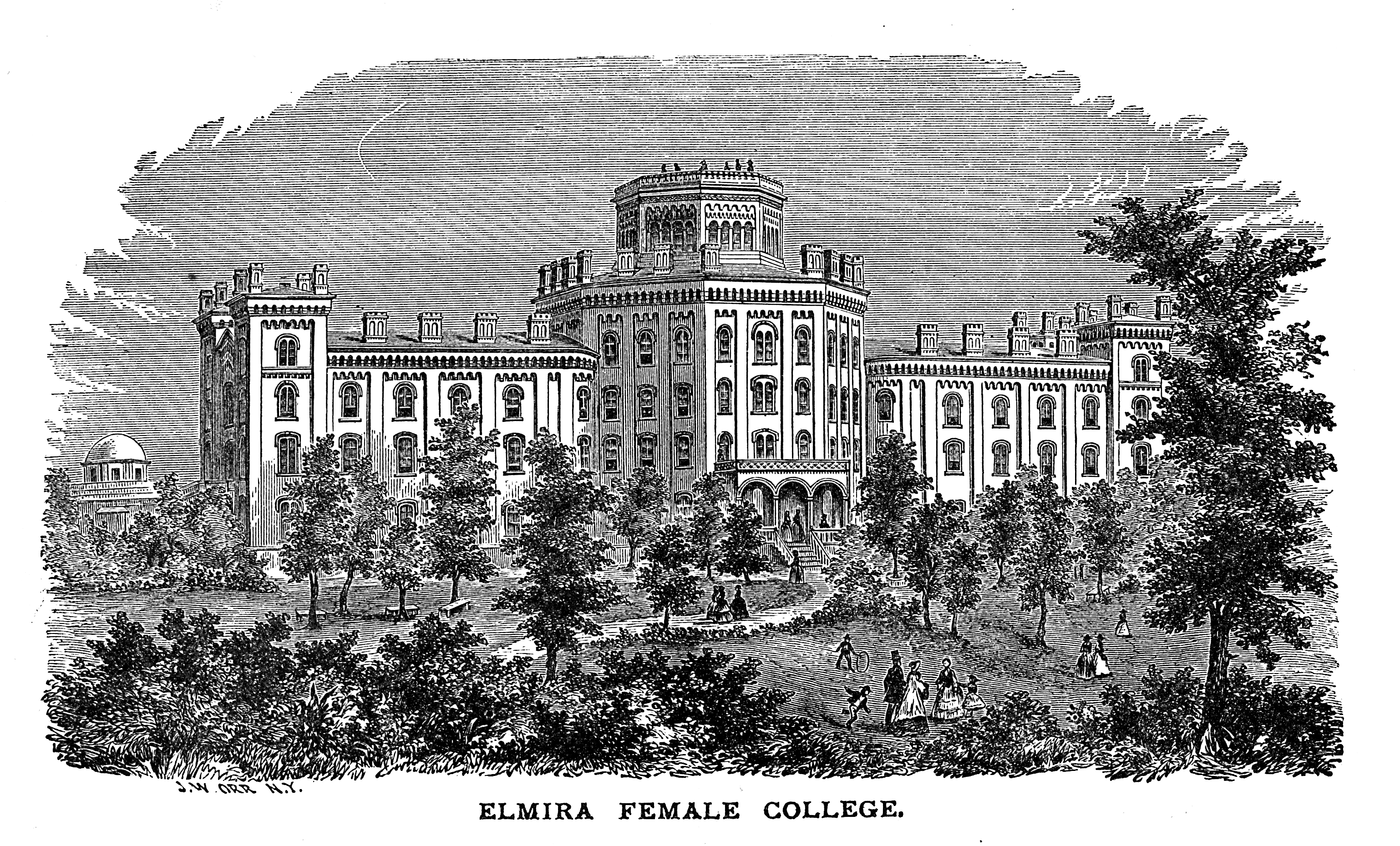
Elmira College in 1869

When plans to charter a women's college in Auburn, New York ran into financial difficulty, Benjamin pledged $5,000 to transfer the charter to Elmira. Benjamin became treasurer and chairman of the Board of Trustees of the new Elmira Female College. Elmira College was founded to be "a real college for women which shall be higher and better than any female institution in the country."

Benjamin selected the college's location on Prospect Hill, and it opened there on October 2, 1855, with 242 students. Benjamin's total contribution to Elmira College over the course of his life and his will totaled $80,000.

=== Other works ===
Benjamin's charitable work extended beyond Elmira college. He donated $10,000 during his lifetime, and bequested $20,000 in his will, to Hamilton College, where he was a trustee. He was also a trustee of Auburn Theological Seminary, to which he donated $10,000. He also gave $2000 to the Elmira Orphan Asylum.

Records indicate that Simeon Benjamin attended anti-slavery meetings. He also provided support in the form of "food, clothing, and cash" to the anti-slavery movement through the work of John W. Jones, a former slave who was Elmira's main "agent" of the Underground Railroad.

== Personal life ==
Benjamin was widely active in Presbyterian Churches in Aquebogue, Brooklyn, and Elmira. He supported the Temperance movement and abolition, and he had connections to the Underground Railroad.

Benjamin married Sarah Wickham Goldsmith, of Mattituck, New York. They had three sons and four daughters; all but one son and one daughter died in childhood. William, the surviving son, died shortly after graduating from Williams College. The surviving daughter married John T. Rathbun, of Elmira.

In 1867, Benjamin became ill with "bronchial affection" and diarrhea, and was largely confined to his home for over a year, unable to climb steps without assistance. Despite these health problems, he took his annual trip, accompanied by his daughter, to his birthplace in Riverhead, Long Island to visit his nephew. Benjamin died there on September 1, 1868, with his daughter by his side. His body was returned to Elmira for burial in Woodlawn Cemetery.

== Legacy ==
A statue of Benjamin stands on the Elmira College campus.

A song about Benjamin was composed by an Elmira College sophomore in 1958.
