= Benjamin Yusupov =

Tajik-Israeli musician (born 1962)

- בנימין יוסופוב
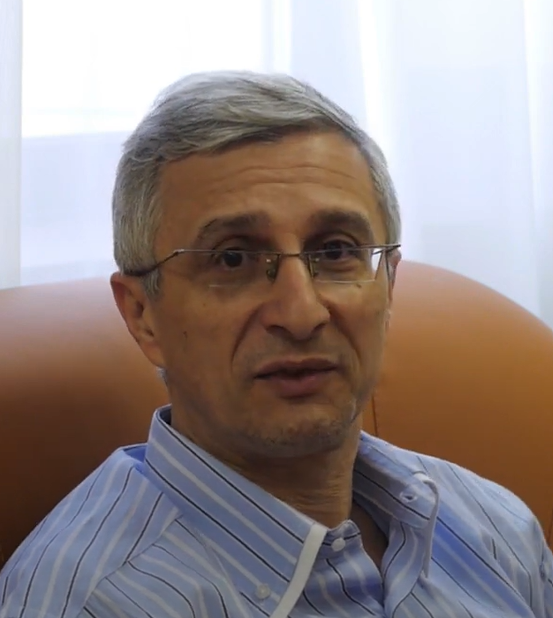
- Yusupov in 2014
- Born: 22 November 1962 (age 63); Dushanbe, Tajik SSR, Soviet Union
- Education: Tchaikovsky State Conservatory, Moscow
- Alma mater: Bar-Ilan University
- Occupations: Composer; Conductor; Pianist
- Notable work: Viola Tango Rock Concerto; Voices of Violin; Cello Concerto for Mischa Maisky
- Awards: Clone Prize (1992); Sherover Award (1993); Israeli Prime Minister Prize (1999, 2008); ACUM Prize (2002, 2004), the ACUM Prize for lifetime achievements (2016); Landau Award for the Performing Arts (2007); Engel Prize (2009)

Benjamin Yusupov (Hebrew: בנימין יוסופוב; born November 22, 1962, in Dushanbe, Tajikistan) is a classical composer, conductor and pianist.

== Biography ==
Yusupov was born in Dushanbe, Tajik SSR (today in Tajikistan) in 1962. He studied piano, composition and conducting at the Tchaikovsky State Conservatory in Moscow with Roman Ledeniov, Yuri Fortunatov and Dmitri Kitajenko. He received his PhD degree at Bar-Ilan University.

Yusupov works closely with outstanding artists as Maxim Vengerov, Mischa Maisky, Vadim Repin, Alexander Kniazev, Maxim Rysanov, Sergei Nakariakov, Konstantin Lifschitz, Reinhold Friedrich and others.

His extensive catalogue, which is published exclusively by Sikorski Musikverlag (Hamburg), has been performed extensively by a wide range of renowned artists and orchestra across the globe the likes of the London Philharmonic, Munich Philharmonic, Israel Philharmonic, Lucerne Symphony Orchestra, Copenhagen Philharmonic, Orchestre Philharmonique de Radio France, Bogota Philharmonic, New World Symphony, NDR Radio-Philharmonie Hannover, Iceland Symphony Orchestra, Belgrade Philharmonic, to name a few.

In 2005, Yusupov’s Viola Tango Rock Concerto - written for the internationally renowned violinist Maxim Vengerov – enjoyed a triumphant world-premiere by the NDR Radio-Philharmonie in Hannover. The music has been welcomed with great enthusiasm by audiences and critics around the globe. The work has been featured in a documentary film about the life of Maxim Vengerov titled "Living the Dream" produced by EMI Classics and distributed worldwide.

Yusupov has also written Cello concerto for Mischa Maisky, commemorating the cellist’s 60th birthday and premiered by Mischa Maisky with Lucerne Symphony Orchestra conducted by the author. The piece was commissioned by three major orchestras: Lucerne Symphony Orchestra, London Philharmonic and Israel Philharmonic.

“Voices of Violin” Concerto No.2 for violin and orchestra also represents an unusual idea: the soloist is invited to play six movements not only from different historical periods of time, not only from different geographical areas, but also different performance styles, styles of sound-making, bowing, intonation, grace notes and so on. The piece was commissioned by Trans-Siberian Art Festival 2014, Orchestre Philharmonique de Radio France and Berliner Symphoniker and performed by Vadim Repin to whom it’s dedicated.

The short list of venues Yusupov appeared as conductor includes KKL Lucerne, Berlin Philharmonie Hall, Amsterdam Concertgebouw, Prinzregententheater Munich, Cologne Philharmonie. He conducted among others Lucerne Symphony, Slovenian Philharmonic, Sinfonietta Amsterdam, Bogota Philharmonic, Iceland Symphony, Novosibirsk Philharmonic, Jerusalem Symphony, Bulgarian National Radio Orchestra, to name a few.

== Awards ==
Yusupov was awarded the Clone Prize (1992), the Sherover Award (1993), the Israeli Prime Minister Prizes (1999, 2008), the ACUM Prize (2002, 2004),the ACUM Prize for lifetime achievements (2016), the Landau Award for the Performing Arts (2007), and Engel Prize (2009).

== Selected works ==
=== Orchestral ===
- Falak (1988)
- Gabriel (1991)
- Symphony No. 1 (revised version) (1992)
- Nostalgia for string orchestra (1992)
- Aleph (1995)
- Iniquities (1998)
- "SHEVATIM" (Twelve Tribes) - SYMPHONY No. 2 (2005)
- Go Tango (2003)
- Postludium (2003)

=== Concertante ===
- Tanovor for flute and chamber orchestra (1994)
- Nola, Concerto for various flutes and string orchestra (1994)
- Concerto for violin and orchestra (1998)
- Dasht, Concerto for trombone, ethnic instruments and orchestra (1999)
- Maximum for flute, harp, violin, viola and orchestra (2003)
- Concerto for viola and orchestra (2003)
- Concerto-Intimo for piano and orchestra (2005)
- Concerto for cello and orchestra (2007)
- Con Moto for marimba (or piano) and string orchestra (2007)
- Images of the Soul, Concerto for two clarinets and orchestra (2010)
- Voices of Violin, Concerto No. 2 for violin and orchestra (2013)
- Listen to our cry, Concerto for trumpet, piano and string orchestra (2015)

=== Instrumental chamber music ===
- Kasida on Mourning for viola, piano and celesta, Op. 4 (1982)
- Sadoi Kuchsor (Mountain Sounds) for brass quintet (1985)
- String Quartet (1986)
- Fantasy for viola solo, Op. 16 (1988)
- Sonata for violoncello and piano (1988)
- Melancholy for piano (1984, 1995)
- Quintet for marimba (or piano) and string quartet (1996)
- Metaphor for harp (or piano) (1996)
- Jonona for flute, oud, double bass and percussion (1996)
- But in Vain for flute, viola and harp, Op. 44 (1997)
- What I Wished For for string quartet (1997)
- Segoh for flute, oud and percussion (1997)
- Sonata for two pianos (1983, 1998)
- Trio for violin, cello and piano (2000)
- Dirlo Bubin for flute, oud, double bass and percussion (2000)
- Crossroads No. 1 for alto flute, violin and crotales (2003)
- Crossroads No. 2 for piano (2004)
- Crossroads No. 3 for guitar (2006)
- Haqqoni – Crossroads No. 4 for clarinet, violin, violoncello, piano and tape (2007)
- Musica Mundi for string quartet (2008)
- Crossroads No. 5 for string sextet (2008)

=== Vocal ===
- Vocal Cycle by Japanese Poets for voice, viola and piano (1985)
- Feelings of Creation, Cantata for narrator, mixed choir, percussion, viola and piano (1995)
- Six Tanka for mezzo-soprano, violin (or viola) and piano (1998)
