= John F. Benjamin (Medal of Honor) =

- Born: Orange County, New York
- Military career
- Allegiance: United States of America
- Branch: United States Army
- Rank: Corporal
- Unit: (New York (state)) 2nd Regiment New York Volunteer Cavalry - Company M
- Conflicts: Battle of Sayler's Creek
- Awards: Medal of Honor

Corporal John F. Benjamin was an American soldier who fought in the American Civil War. Benjamin was awarded the country's highest award for bravery during combat, the Medal of Honor, for his action during the Battle of Sayler's Creek in Virginia on 6 April 1865. He was honored with the award on 3 May 1865.

== Medal of Honor citation ==
Capture of battle flag of 9th Virginia Infantry (C.S.A.).

== See also ==
- Battle of Sayler's Creek
- List of American Civil War Medal of Honor recipients: A–F
