= Benjamin Frick =

American politician (1796–1871)

Member of the Pennsylvania Senate from the Montgomery County district
- In office 1853–1855

Personal details
- Born: April 26, 1796 Coventry, Chester County, Pennsylvania, U.S.
- Died: October 4, 1871 (aged 75) Berks County, Pennsylvania, U.S.
- Resting place: Oak Grove Cemetery; Parker Ford, Pennsylvania, U.S.
- Party: Whig
- Spouse: Eleanor Davis (m. 1815)
- Children: 6
- Occupation: Politician; businessman

Benjamin Frick (April 26, 1796 – October 4, 1871) was an American politician from Pennsylvania. He served as a member of the Pennsylvania Senate, representing Montgomery County from 1853 to 1855.

== Early life ==
Benjamin Frick was born on April 26, 1796, in Coventry, Chester County, Pennsylvania, to Catherine (née Grumbacher) and John Frick.

== Career ==
Frick worked in the lumber business at Limerick Station on Schuylkill River. He was postmaster of Limerick Station for 20 years. He was secretary of the Perkiomen and Reading Turnpike Road Company from 1836 to 1871. He was director of Pottstown Bank and the Bank of Montgomery County in Norristown. He was a business agent for the Reading Company until he resigned in 1869. He owned several boats on the canal.

Frick was a Whig. He served as a member of the Pennsylvania Senate, representing Montgomery County from 1853 to 1855.

== Personal life ==
Frick married Eleanor "Ellen" Davis in 1815. They had six children, David, Elizabeth, James, Mary, Catharine Sisler, Charles. His grandson Montgomery was a businessman in Chester County.

Frick died on October 4, 1871, at his home in Berks County. He was buried at Oak Grove Cemetery in Parker Ford.
