= Veniamin =

Veniamin (Russian: Вениамин) is the Russian, Ukrainian and Greek version of the name Benjamin, and may refer to:

- Veniamin Alexandrov (1937–1991), Soviet professional ice hockey player
- Veniamin Belkin (1884–1951), Russian artist and painter
- Veniamin Fleishman, (1913–1941), Russian composer
- Veniamin Kagan (1869–1953), Russian mathematician and expert in geometry
- Veniamin Kaverin (1902–1989), Soviet writer associated with the early 1920s movement of the Serapion Brothers
- Veniamin (Kazansky) (1873–1922), bishop in the Russian Orthodox Church, Archbishop of Petrograd 1917–1922
- Veniamin Kondratyev (born 1970), Russian politician and governor of Krasnodar Krai
- Veniamin Levich (1917–1987), physicist, an expert in the field of electrochemical hydrodynamics
- Veniamin Mandrykin (born 1981), Russian professional football goalkeeper
- Veniamin of Petersburg (1874–1922), Metropolitan of Petrograd and Gdov 1917–1922
- Veniamin Smekhov (born 1940), Russian actor and stage director
- Veniamin Soldatenko (born 1939), former Soviet athlete who competed mainly in the 50 km walk
- Veniamin Tayanovich (born 1967), retired Russian freestyle swimmer

As a last name:

- Andrew Veniamin (1975–2004), Australian criminal, a suspected mass murderer and drug dealer
