= Benjamin de Vries =

Dutch-Israeli economic historian

Benjamin Willem de Vries (Hebrew: בנג'מין דה פריס; born 24 June 1923) is a Dutch-Israeli economic historian. He is an associate professor at Bar-Ilan University.

== Career ==
De Vries was born on 24 June 1923 in Amsterdam, the Netherlands. He studied economics at the University of Amsterdam and obtained his BA in 1948, a further MA in 1951, and finally his PhD in 1956. In 1957 he moved to Israel and started working at a cement factory. From 1958 to 1959 de Vries worked for the Israeli Export Institute. From 1960 until 1988, he was adjunct director of the export market research department of the Ministry of Industry and Trade.

From 1968 to 1970 de Vries was a lecturer of Business Administration at Tel Aviv University. In 1973 he moved to the Economic Department of Bar-Ilan University where he became a senior lecturer, in 1990 he was promoted to associate professor.

De Vries was elected a corresponding member of the Royal Netherlands Academy of Arts and Sciences in 1984.
