= Benjamin Hall =

Benjamin or Ben Hall may refer to:

== Actors ==
- Ben Hall (American actor) (1899–1985), bit-part character performer
- Ben Hall (Australian actor), played Ned Willis on Neighbours during 2016–2022

== Public officials ==
- Benjamin Hall (industrialist) (1778–1817), Welsh industrialist and MP
- Benjamin Hall, 1st Baron Llanover (1802–1867), British Whig/Liberal MP and reformer, son of above
- Benjamin F. Hall (1814–1891), American chief justice in Colorado during Civil War
- Benjamin F. Hall (Illinois politician), 19th century Illinois state representative
- Ben L. Hall (1936–2022), American state legislator and commissioner from New Mexico

== Sportsmen ==
- Ben Hall (footballer, born 1879) (1879–1963), English manager and trainer
- Ben Hall (baseball) (born 1983), American second baseman and college coach
- Benjamin Hall (athlete) (born 1984), Australian Paralympian
- Ben Hall (footballer, born 1997), Northern Irish defender for Linfield

== Writers ==
- Ben M. Hall (1921–1970), American theater historian
- Benjamin Hall (journalist) (born 1982), English-American TV and print personality

== Others ==
- Ben Hall (bushranger) (1837–1865), Australian legendary outlaw
  - Ben Hall (TV series), 1975 Australian 13-episode recounting of bushranger's life
  - The Legend of Ben Hall, 2016 Australian film about bushranger's life
- Benjamin D. Hall, American human genetics researcher

== See also ==
- Ben Hall, American University of Texas at Austin academic building a/k/a Benedict Hall
- Benn Hall, English conference, seminar, exhibition, concert and party venue in Rugby, Warwickshire
