= Diels–Alder reaction =

Chemical reaction

Reaction type	Cycloaddition

Identifiers
Organic Chemistry Portal	diels-alder-reaction
RSC ontology ID	RXNO:0000006

Diels–Alder reaction, simplest example

In organic chemistry, the Diels–Alder reaction is a chemical reaction between a conjugated diene and a substituted alkene, commonly termed the dienophile, to form a substituted cyclohexene derivative. It is the prototypical pericyclic reaction with a concerted mechanism; specifically, it is a thermally-allowed [4+2] cycloaddition with Woodward–Hoffmann symbol [_{π}4_{s} + _{π}2_{s}].

Simultaneously constructing two new carbon–carbon bonds, the Diels–Alder reaction reliably forms six-membered rings with good regio- and stereochemical control. Consequently, it is a powerful tool, widely applied to introduce chemical complexity in the synthesis of natural products and new materials.

The reaction was first described by Otto Diels and Kurt Alder in 1928. For its discovery, they were awarded the Nobel Prize in Chemistry in 1950.

The underlying concept has been generalized in several different directions. In the hetero-Diels–Alder reaction, π-systems involving heteroatoms, such as carbonyls and imines, furnish the corresponding heterocycles. Diels-Alder-like reactions occur for other ring sizes, although none matched the [4+2] reaction in scope and versatility. Because ΔH° and ΔS° are negative for a typical Diels–Alder reaction, the reverse of a Diels–Alder reaction becomes favorable at high temperatures. This retro-Diels–Alder reaction is of synthetic importance for only a limited range of Diels–Alder adducts, generally with some special structural features.

== Mechanism ==
The reaction is an example of a concerted pericyclic reaction. It is believed to occur via a single, cyclic transition state, with no intermediates generated during the course of the reaction. As such, the Diels–Alder reaction is governed by orbital symmetry considerations: it is classified as a [_{π}4_{s} + _{π}2_{s}] cycloaddition, indicating that it proceeds through the suprafacial/suprafacial interaction of a 4π electron system (the diene structure) with a 2π electron system (the dienophile structure), an interaction that leads to a transition state without an additional orbital symmetry-imposed energetic barrier and allows the Diels–Alder reaction to take place with relative ease.

A consideration of the reactants' frontier molecular orbitals (FMO) makes plain why this is so. (The same conclusion can be drawn from an orbital correlation diagram or a Dewar-Zimmerman analysis.) For the more common "normal" electron demand Diels–Alder reaction, the more important of the two HOMO/LUMO interactions is that between the electron-rich diene's ψ_{2} as the highest occupied molecular orbital (HOMO) with the electron-deficient dienophile's π* as the lowest unoccupied molecular orbital (LUMO). However, the HOMO–LUMO energy gap is close enough that the roles can be reversed by switching electronic effects of the substituents on the two components. In an inverse (reverse) electron-demand Diels–Alder reaction, electron-withdrawing substituents on the diene lower the energy of its empty ψ_{3} orbital and electron-donating substituents on the dienophile raise the energy of its filled π orbital sufficiently that the interaction between these two orbitals becomes the most energetically significant stabilizing orbital interaction. Regardless of which situation pertains, the HOMO and LUMO of the components are in phase and a bonding interaction results as can be seen in the diagram below. Since the reactants are in their ground state, the reaction is initiated thermally and does not require activation by light.

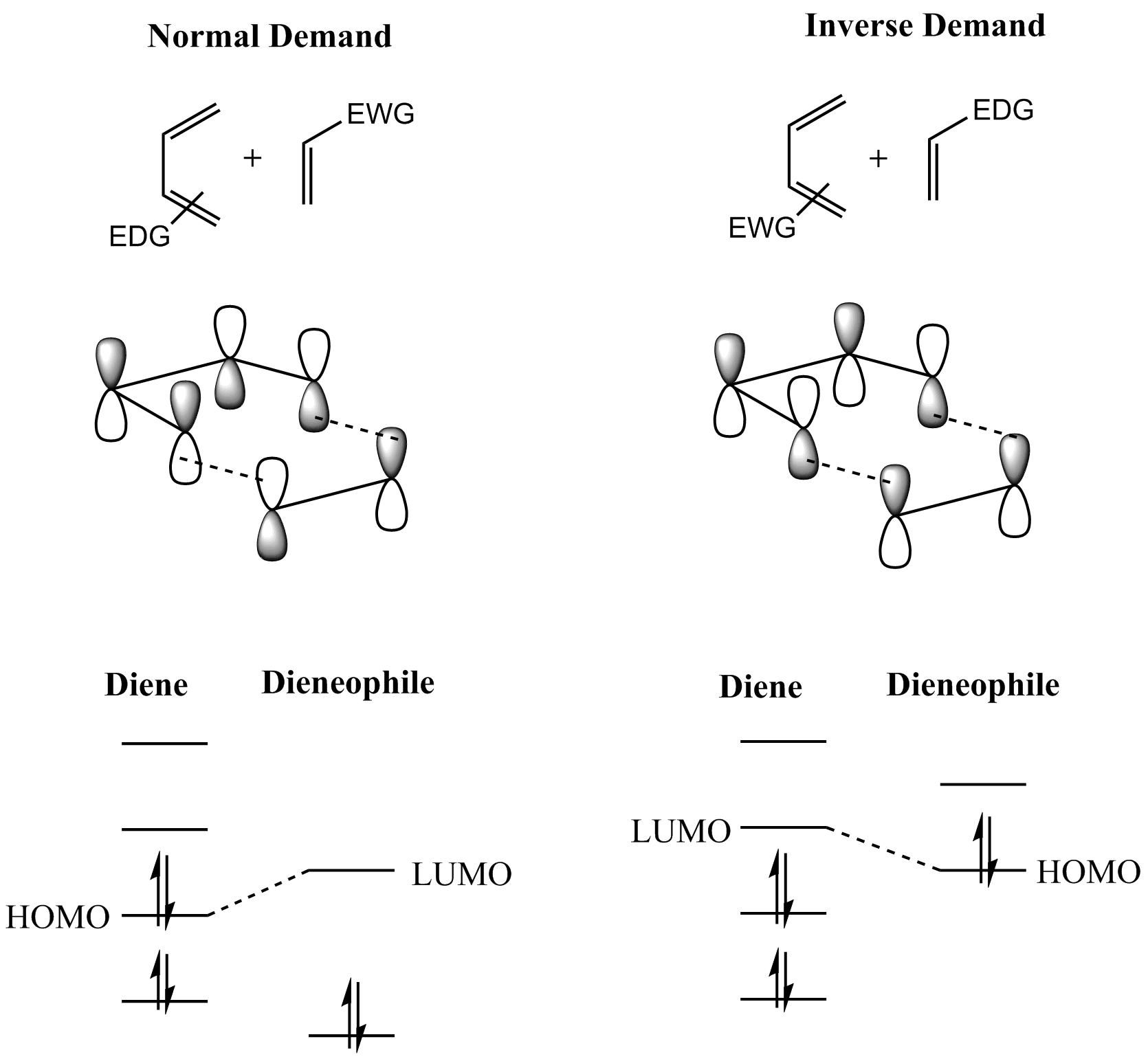
FMO analysis of the Diels–Alder reaction

Additional phenomena beyond the frontier orbital interactions also affect the reaction rate. One simple way to deduce this is to note that the HOMO-LUMO interactions detailed above apply to all donor-acceptor complexes, even though not all donor-acceptor complexes undergo the Diels–Alder reaction. In practice, most of the other phenomena are captured in the reaction enthalpy, and the orbital interaction can be estimated from geometry and ionization energies. An empirical formula for the reaction rate of an uncatalyzed reaction is
$$\log(k\cdot\textrm{mol}\cdot\textrm{s})=\left(290\pm10-(60.8\pm2.8)\text{ Å}^{-1}\cdot R\right)\frac{\textrm{eV}}{I_D-E_A}-(5.05\pm0.39)\frac{\textrm{mol}}{\textrm{kJ}}\cdot\Delta H-28.2$$
where k is the reaction rate, R is the distance between the two ends of the diene, I_{D} is the ionization potential of the diene, E_{A} is the electron affinity of the dienophile, and ΔH is the reaction enthalpy.

The "prevailing opinion" is that most Diels–Alder reactions proceed through a concerted mechanism; the issue, however, has been thoroughly contested. Despite the fact that the vast majority of Diels–Alder reactions exhibit stereospecific, syn addition of the two components, a diradical intermediate has been postulated (and supported with computational evidence) on the grounds that the observed stereospecificity does not rule out a two-step addition involving an intermediate that collapses to product faster than it can rotate to allow for inversion of stereochemistry.

There is a notable rate enhancement when certain Diels–Alder reactions are carried out in polar organic solvents such as dimethylformamide and ethylene glycol, and even in water. The reaction of cyclopentadiene and butenone for example is 700 times faster in water relative to 2,2,4-trimethylpentane as solvent. Several explanations for this effect have been proposed, such as an increase in effective concentration due to hydrophobic packing or hydrogen-bond stabilization of the transition state.

The geometry of the diene and dienophile components each propagate into stereochemical details of the product. For intermolecular reactions especially, the preferred positional and stereochemical relationship of substituents of the two components compared to each other are controlled by electronic effects. However, for intramolecular Diels–Alder cycloaddition reactions, the conformational stability of the structure of the transition state can be an overwhelming influence.

=== Regioselectivity ===
Frontier molecular orbital theory has also been used to explain the regioselectivity patterns observed in Diels–Alder reactions of substituted systems. Calculation of the energy and orbital coefficients of the components' frontier orbitals provides a picture that is in good accord with the more straightforward analysis of the substituents' resonance effects, as illustrated below.

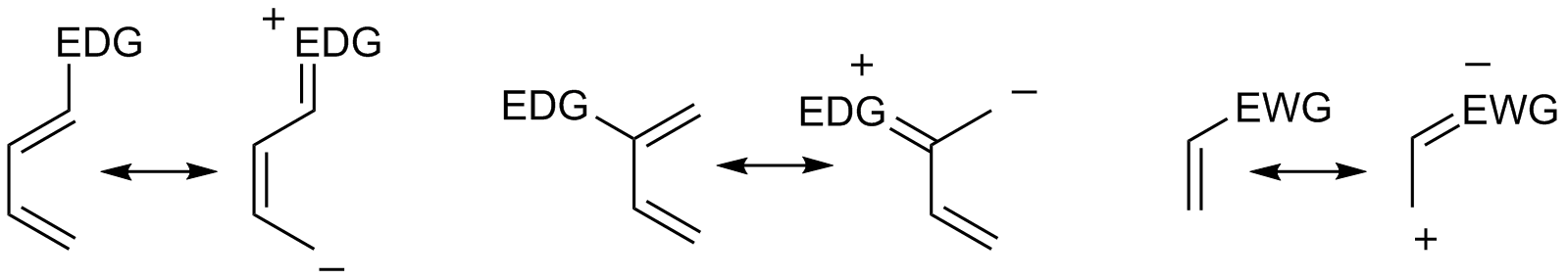
Resonance structures of normal-demand dienes and dienophiles

In general, the regioselectivity found for both normal and inverse electron-demand Diels–Alder reaction follows the ortho-para rule, so named, because the cyclohexene product bears substituents in positions that are analogous to the ortho and para positions of disubstituted arenes. For example, in a normal-demand scenario, a diene bearing an electron-donating group (EDG) at C1 has its largest HOMO coefficient at C4, while the dienophile with an electron withdrawing group (EWG) at C1 has the largest LUMO coefficient at C2. Pairing these two coefficients gives the "ortho" product as seen in case 1 in the figure below. A diene substituted at C2 as in case 2 below has the largest HOMO coefficient at C1, giving rise to the "para" product. Similar analyses for the corresponding inverse-demand scenarios gives rise to the analogous products as seen in cases 3 and 4. Examining the canonical mesomeric forms above, it is easy to verify that these results are in accord with expectations based on consideration of electron density and polarization.

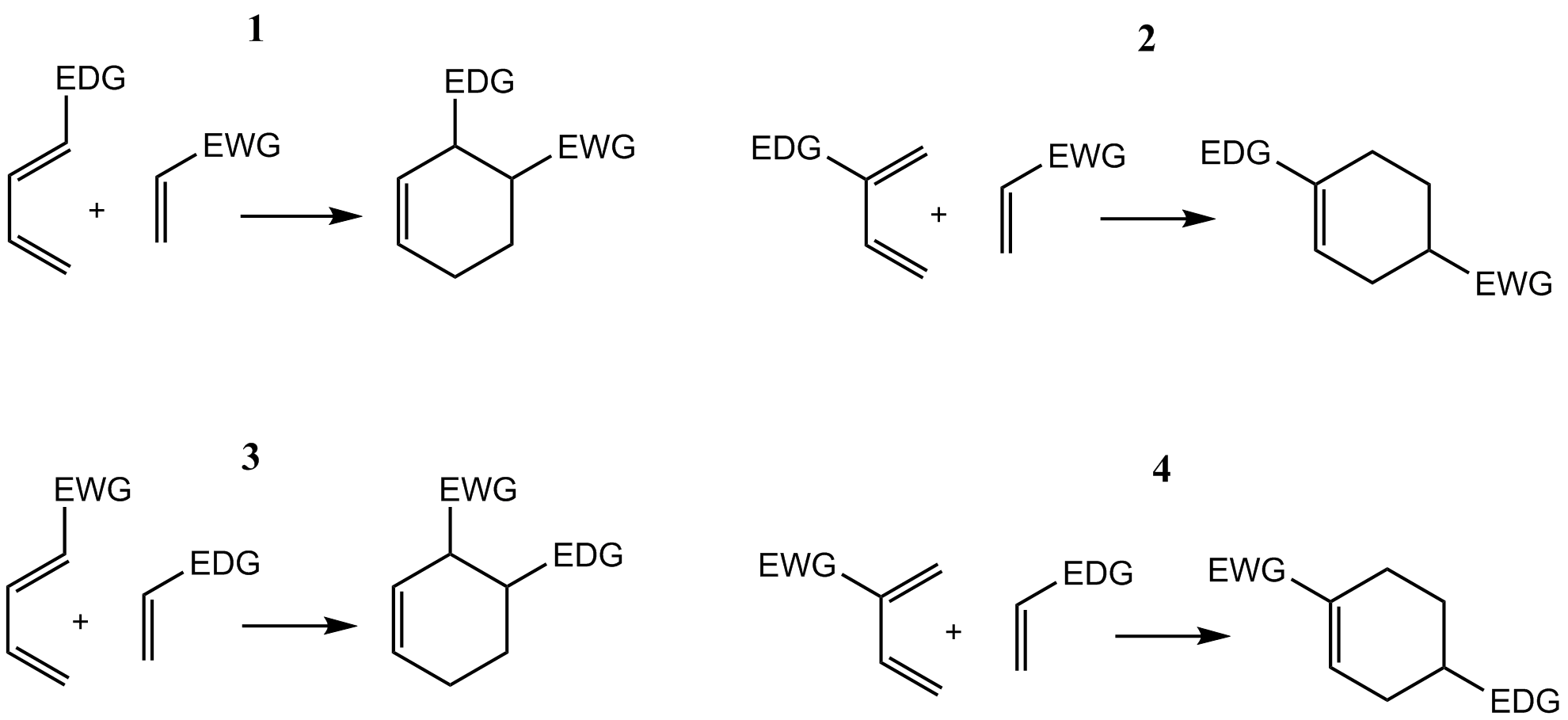
Regioselectivity in normal (1 and 2) and inverse (3 and 4) electron demand Diels-Alder reactions

In general, with respect to the energetically most well-matched HOMO-LUMO pair, maximizing the interaction energy by forming bonds between centers with the largest frontier orbital coefficients allows the prediction of the main regioisomer that will result from a given diene-dienophile combination. In a more sophisticated treatment, three types of substituents (Z withdrawing: HOMO and LUMO lowering (CF_{3}, NO_{2}, CN, C(O)CH_{3}), X donating: HOMO and LUMO raising (Me, OMe, NMe_{2}), C conjugating: HOMO raising and LUMO lowering (Ph, vinyl)) are considered, resulting in a total of 18 possible combinations. The maximization of orbital interaction correctly predicts the product in all cases for which experimental data is available. For instance, in uncommon combinations involving X groups on both diene and dienophile, a 1,3-substitution pattern may be favored, an outcome not accounted for by a simplistic resonance structure argument. However, cases where the resonance argument and the matching of largest orbital coefficients disagree are rare.

=== Stereospecificity and stereoselectivity ===
Diels–Alder reactions, as concerted cycloadditions, are stereospecific. Stereochemical information of the diene and the dienophile are retained in the product, as a syn addition with respect to each component. For example, substituents in a cis (trans, resp.) relationship on the double bond of the dienophile give rise to substituents that are cis (trans, resp.) on those same carbons with respect to the cyclohexene ring. Likewise, cis,cis- and trans,trans-disubstituted dienes give cis substituents at these carbons of the product whereas cis,trans-disubstituted dienes give trans substituents:

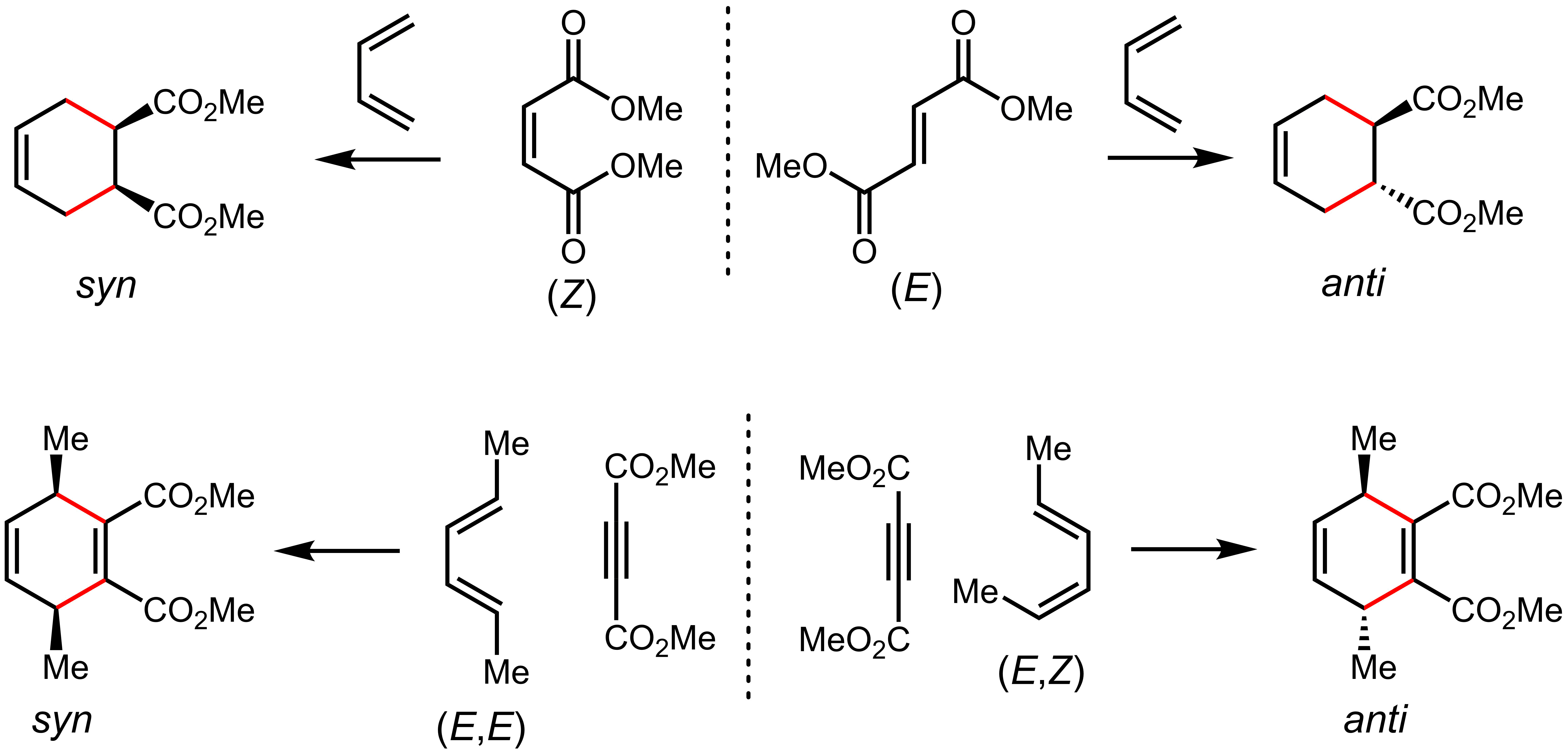

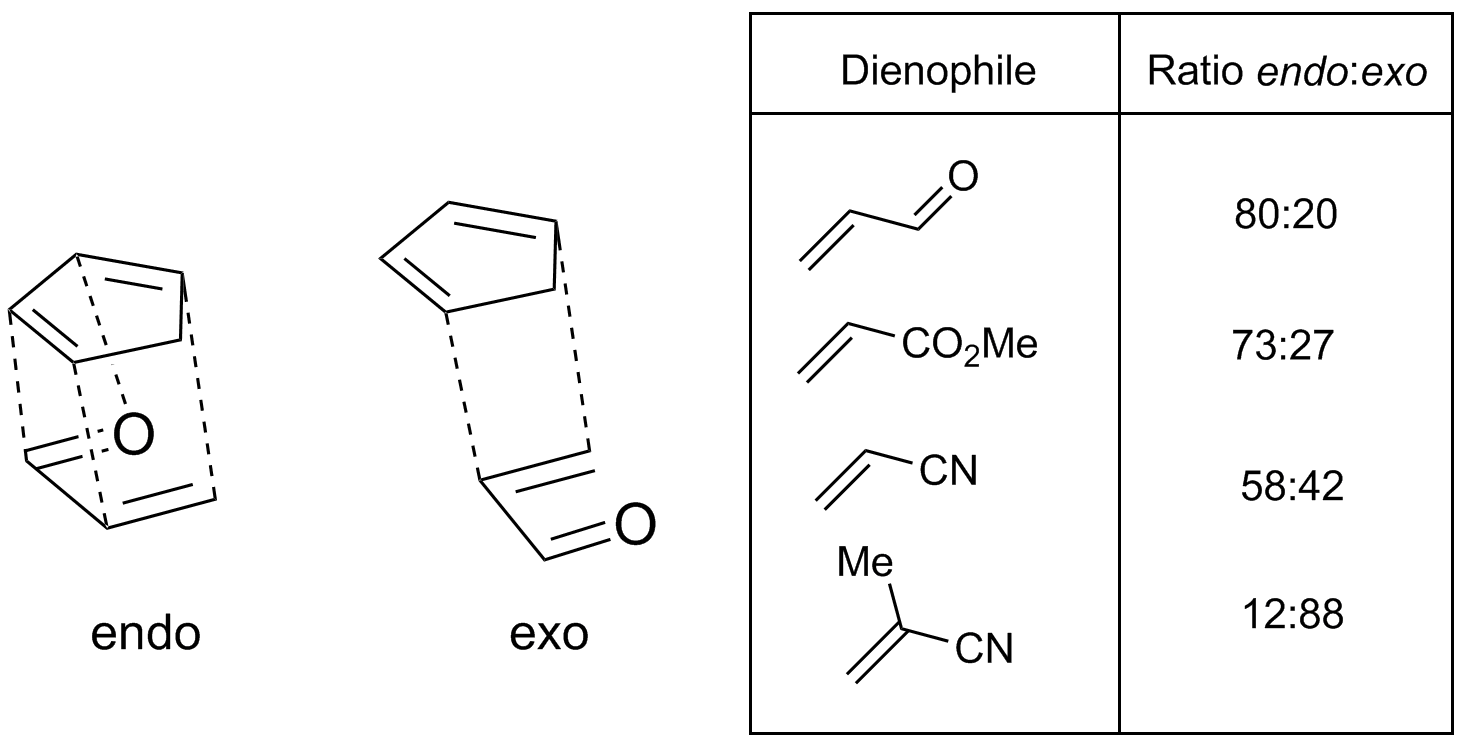
Endo and exo transition states for cyclopentadiene adding to acrolein; endo/exo product ratio for this and various other dienophiles

Diels–Alder reactions in which adjacent stereocenters are generated at the two ends of the newly formed single bonds imply two different possible stereochemical outcomes. This is a stereoselective situation based on the relative orientation of the two separate components when they react with each other. In the context of the Diels–Alder reaction, the transition state in which the most significant substituent (an electron-withdrawing and/or conjugating group) on the dienophile is oriented towards the diene π system and slips under it as the reaction takes place is known as the endo transition state. In the alternative exo transition state, it is oriented away from it. (There is a more general usage of the terms endo and exo in stereochemical nomenclature.)

In cases where the dienophile has a single electron-withdrawing / conjugating substituent, or two electron-withdrawing / conjugating substituents cis to each other, the outcome can often be predicted. In these "normal demand" Diels–Alder scenarios, the endo transition state is typically preferred, despite often being more sterically congested. This preference is known as the Alder endo rule. As originally stated by Alder, the transition state that is preferred is the one with a "maximum accumulation of double bonds." Endo selectivity is typically higher for rigid dienophiles such as maleic anhydride and benzoquinone; for others, such as acrylates and crotonates, selectivity is not very pronounced.

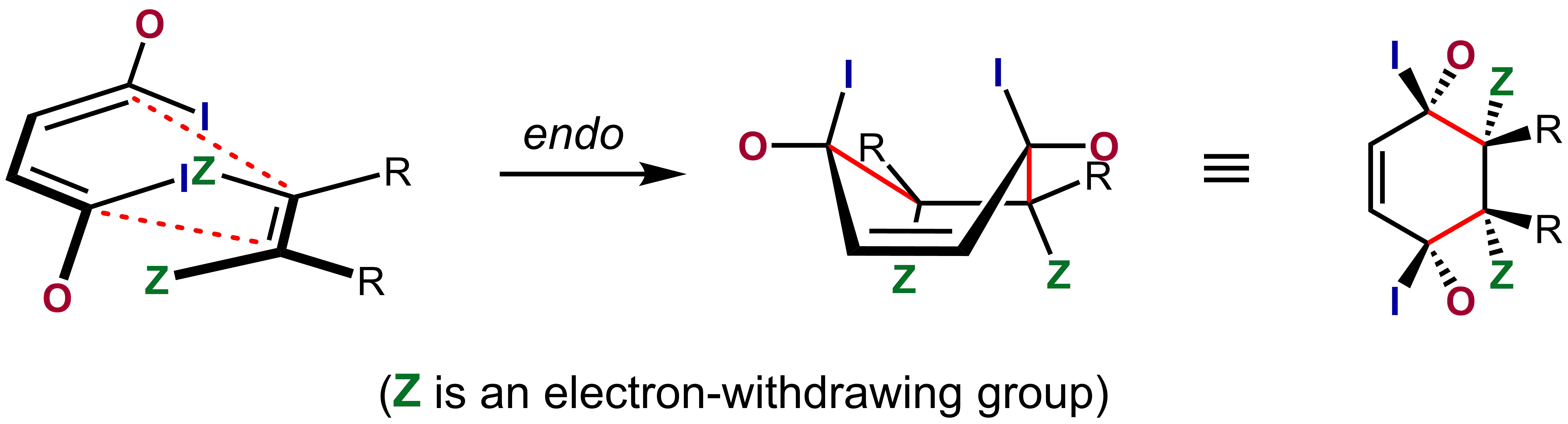
The endo rule applies when there the electron-withdrawing groups on the dienophile are all on one side.

The most widely accepted explanation for the origin of this effect is a favorable interaction between the π systems of the dienophile and the diene, an interaction described as a secondary orbital effect, though dipolar and van der Waals attractions may play a part as well, and solvent can sometimes make a substantial difference in selectivity. The secondary orbital overlap explanation was first proposed by Woodward and Hoffmann. In this explanation, the orbitals associated with the group in conjugation with the dienophile double-bond overlap with the interior orbitals of the diene, a situation that is possible only for the endo transition state. Although the original explanation only invoked the orbital on the atom α to the dienophile double bond, Salem and Houk have subsequently proposed that orbitals on the α and β carbons both participate when molecular geometry allows.

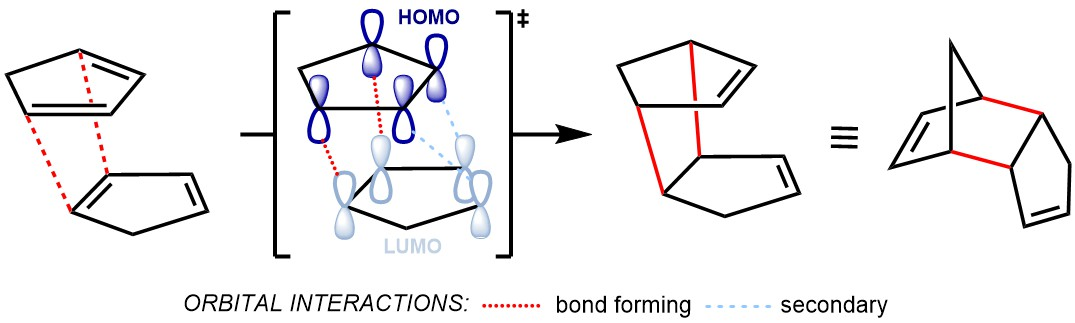

Often, as with highly substituted dienes, very bulky dienophiles, or reversible reactions (as in the case of furan as diene), steric effects can override the normal endo selectivity in favor of the exo isomer.

=== The diene ===
The diene component of the Diels–Alder reaction can be either open-chain or cyclic, and it can host many different types of substituents. It must, however, be able to exist in the s-cis conformation, since this is the only conformer that can participate in the reaction. Though butadienes are typically more stable in the s-trans conformation, for most cases energy difference is small (~2–5 kcal/mol).

A bulky substituent at the C2 or C3 position can increase reaction rate by destabilizing the s-trans conformation and forcing the diene into the reactive s-cis conformation. 2-tert-butyl-buta-1,3-diene, for example, is 27 times more reactive than simple butadiene. Conversely, a diene having bulky substituents at both C2 and C3 is less reactive because the steric interactions between the substituents destabilize the s-cis conformation.

Dienes with bulky terminal substituents (C1 and C4) decrease the rate of reaction, presumably by impeding the approach of the diene and dienophile.

An especially reactive diene is 1-methoxy-3-trimethylsiloxy-buta-1,3-diene, otherwise known as Danishefsky's diene. It has particular synthetic utility as means of furnishing α,β–unsaturated cyclohexenone systems by elimination of the 1-methoxy substituent after deprotection of the enol silyl ether. Other synthetically useful derivatives of Danishefsky's diene include 1,3-alkoxy-1-trimethylsiloxy-1,3-butadienes (Brassard dienes) and 1-dialkylamino-3-trimethylsiloxy-1,3-butadienes (Rawal dienes). The increased reactivity of these and similar dienes is a result of synergistic contributions from donor groups at C1 and C3, raising the HOMO significantly above that of a comparable monosubstituted diene.

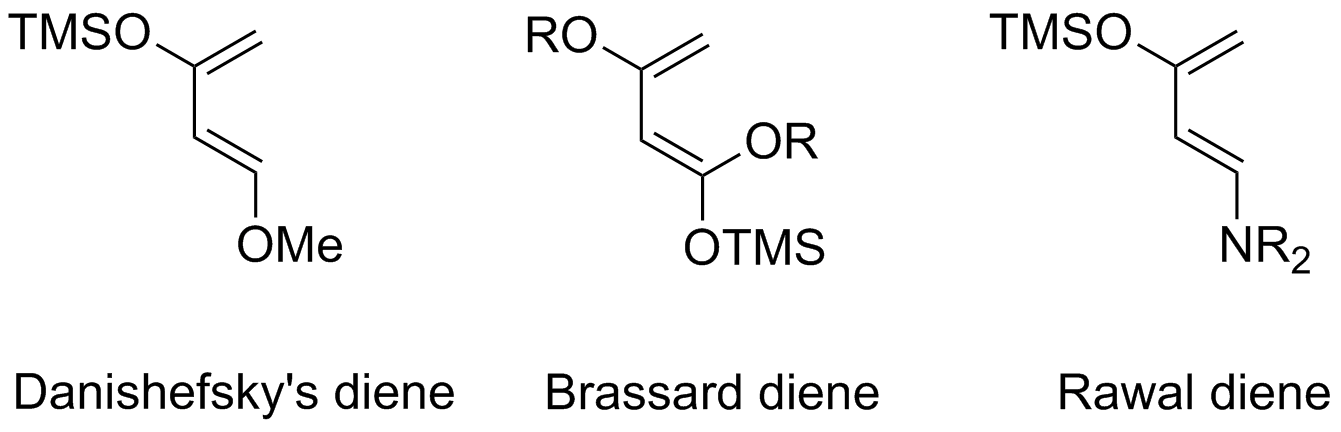
General form of Danishefsky, Brassard, and Rawal dienes

Unstable (and thus highly reactive) dienes can be synthetically useful, e.g. o-quinodimethanes can be generated in situ. In contrast, stable dienes, such as naphthalene, require forcing conditions and/or highly reactive dienophiles, such as N-phenylmaleimide. Anthracene, being less aromatic (and therefore more reactive for Diels–Alder syntheses) in its central ring can form a 9,10 adduct with maleic anhydride at 80 °C and even with acetylene, a weak dienophile, at 250 °C.

=== The dienophile ===
In a normal demand Diels–Alder reaction, the dienophile has an electron-withdrawing group in conjugation with the alkene; in an inverse-demand scenario, the dienophile is conjugated with an electron-donating group. Dienophiles can be chosen to contain a "masked functionality". The dienophile undergoes Diels–Alder reaction with a diene introducing such a functionality onto the product molecule. A series of reactions then follow to transform the functionality into a desirable group. The end product cannot be made in a single DA step because equivalent dienophile is either unreactive or inaccessible. An example of such approach is the use of α-chloroacrylonitrile (CH_{2}=CClCN). When reacted with a diene, this dienophile will introduce α-chloronitrile functionality onto the product molecule. This is a "masked functionality" which can be then hydrolyzed to form a ketone. α-Chloroacrylonitrile dienophile is an equivalent of ketene dienophile (CH_{2}=C=O), which would produce same product in one DA step. The problem is that ketene itself cannot be used in Diels–Alder reactions because it reacts with dienes in unwanted manner (by [2+2] cycloaddition), and therefore "masked functionality" approach has to be used. Other such functionalities are phosphonium substituents (yielding exocyclic double bonds after Wittig reaction), various sulfoxide and sulfonyl functionalities (both are acetylene equivalents), and nitro groups (ketene equivalents).

== Variants on the classical Diels–Alder reaction ==
=== Other ring sizes ===
In trimethylenemethane cycloaddition and 1,3-dipolar cycloaddition, the eponymous synthon replaces the diene. In (4+3) cycloaddition, an allyl cation replaces the dienophile.

=== Hetero-Diels–Alder ===
An example of a Hetero-Diels-Alder reaction, which results in the synthesis of a bicyclic heterocycle.

Diels–Alder reactions involving at least one heteroatom are also known and are collectively called hetero-Diels–Alder reactions. Carbonyl groups, for example, can successfully react with dienes to yield dihydropyran rings, a reaction known as the oxo-Diels–Alder reaction, and imines can be used, either as the dienophile or at various sites in the diene, to form various N-heterocyclic compounds through the aza-Diels–Alder reaction. Nitroso compounds (R–N=O) can react with dienes to form oxazines. Chlorosulfonyl isocyanate can be utilized as a dienophile to prepare Vince lactam.

=== Lewis acid activation ===
Lewis acids, such as zinc chloride, boron trifluoride, tin tetrachloride, or aluminium chloride, can catalyze Diels–Alder reactions by binding to the dienophile. Traditionally, the enhanced Diels-Alder reactivity is ascribed to the ability of the Lewis acid to lower the LUMO of the activated dienophile, which results in a smaller normal electron demand HOMO-LUMO orbital energy gap and hence more stabilizing orbital interactions.

Recent studies, however, have shown that this rationale behind Lewis acid-catalyzed Diels–Alder reactions is incorrect. It is found that Lewis acids accelerate the Diels–Alder reaction by reducing the destabilizing steric Pauli repulsion between the interacting diene and dienophile and not by lowering the energy of the dienophile's LUMO and consequently, enhancing the normal electron demand orbital interaction. The Lewis acid binds via a donor-acceptor interaction to the dienophile and via that mechanism polarizes occupied orbital density away from the reactive C=C double bond of the dienophile towards the Lewis acid. This reduced occupied orbital density on C=C double bond of the dienophile will, in turn, engage in a less repulsive closed-shell-closed-shell orbital interaction with the incoming diene, reducing the destabilizing steric Pauli repulsion and hence lowers the Diels–Alder reaction barrier. In addition, the Lewis acid catalyst also increases the asynchronicity of the Diels–Alder reaction, making the occupied π-orbital located on the C=C double bond of the dienophile asymmetric. As a result, this enhanced asynchronicity leads to an extra reduction of the destabilizing steric Pauli repulsion as well as a diminishing pressure on the reactants to deform, in other words, it reduced the destabilizing activation strain (also known as distortion energy). This working catalytic mechanism is known as Pauli-lowering catalysis, which is operative in a variety of organic reactions.

The original rationale behind Lewis acid-catalyzed Diels–Alder reactions is incorrect, because besides lowering the energy of the dienophile's LUMO, the Lewis acid also lowers the energy of the HOMO of the dienophile and hence increases the inverse electron demand LUMO-HOMO orbital energy gap. Thus, indeed Lewis acid catalysts strengthen the normal electron demand orbital interaction by lowering the LUMO of the dienophile, but, they simultaneously weaken the inverse electron demand orbital interaction by also lowering the energy of the dienophile's HOMO. These two counteracting phenomena effectively cancel each other, resulting in nearly unchanged orbital interactions when compared to the corresponding uncatalyzed Diels–Alder reactions and making this not the active mechanism behind Lewis acid-catalyzed Diels–Alder reactions.

=== Asymmetric Diels–Alder ===
Many methods have been developed for influencing the stereoselectivity of the Diels–Alder reaction, such as the use of chiral auxiliaries, catalysis by chiral Lewis acids, and small organic molecule catalysts. Evans' oxazolidinones, oxazaborolidines, bis-oxazoline–copper chelates, imidazoline catalysis, and many other methodologies exist for effecting diastereo- and enantioselective Diels–Alder reactions.

=== Hexadehydro Diels–Alder ===
In the hexadehydro Diels–Alder reaction, alkynes and diynes are used instead of alkenes and dienes, forming an unstable benzyne intermediate which can then be trapped to form an aromatic product. This reaction allows the formation of heavily functionalized aromatic rings in a single step.

== Applications and natural occurrence ==
Asymmetric Diels-Alder reaction is one step in the biosynthesis of the statin lovastatin.

The retro-Diels–Alder reaction is used in the industrial production of cyclopentadiene. Cyclopentadiene is a precursor to various norbornenes, which are common monomers. The Diels–Alder reaction is also employed in the production of vitamin B6.

Typical route for production of ethylidene norbornene from cyclopentadiene through vinyl norbornene.

== History ==
The reaction discovered by Diels and Alder in 1928.

The Diels–Alder reaction was the culmination of several intertwined research threads, some near misses, and ultimately, the insightful recognition of a general principle by Otto Diels and Kurt Alder. Their seminal work, detailed in a series of 28 articles published in the Justus Liebigs Annalen der Chemie and Berichte der deutschen chemischen Gesellschaft from 1928 to 1937, established the reaction's wide applicability and its importance in constructing six-membered rings. The first 19 articles were authored by Diels and Alder, while the later articles were authored by Diels and various other coauthors. However, the history of the reaction extends further back, revealing a fascinating narrative of discoveries missed and opportunities overlooked.

Several chemists, working independently in the late 19th and early 20th centuries, encountered reactions that, in retrospect, involved the Diels-Alder process but remained unrecognized as such.

- Theodor Zincke performed a series of experiments between 1892 and 1912 involving tetrachlorocyclopentadienone, a highly reactive diene analogue.
- In 1910, Sergey Lebedev systematically investigated thermal polymerization of three conjugated dienes (butadiene, isoprene and dimethylbutadiene), a process now recognized as a Diels-Alder self-reaction, providing a detailed analysis of the dimerization products and recognizing the importance of the conjugated system in the process. Five years earlier, Carl Harries studied the degradation of natural rubber, leading him to propose a cyclic structure for the polymer.
- Hermann Staudinger's work with ketenes published in 1912 covered both [2+2] cycloadditions, where one molecule of a ketene reacted with an unsaturated compound to form a four-membered ring, and, importantly, [4+2] cycloadditions. In the latter case, two molecules of ketene combined with one molecule of an unsaturated compound (such as a quinone) to yield a six-membered ring. While not a classic Diels–Alder reaction in the typical sense of a conjugated diene and a separate dienophile, Staudinger's observation of this [4+2] process, forming a six-membered ring, foreshadowed the later work of Diels and Alder. However, his focus remained primarily on the more common [2+2] ketene cycloaddition.
- Hans von Euler-Chelpin and K. O. Josephson, investigating isoprene and butadiene reactions in 1920, both observed products consistent with Diels-Alder cycloadditions, but didn't go on to research it further.
- Perhaps the most striking near miss came from Walter Albrecht in early 1900s. Working in Johannes Thiele's laboratory, Albrecht investigated the reaction of cyclopentadiene with para-benzoquinone. His 1902 doctoral dissertation clearly describes the formation of the Diels-Alder adduct, even providing (incorrect) structural assignments. However, influenced by Thiele's focus on conjugation and partial valence, Albrecht in his 1906 publication interpreted the reaction as a 1,4-addition followed by a 1,2-addition, completely overlooking the cycloaddition aspect.

While these observations hinted at the possibility of a broader class of cycloaddition reactions, they remained isolated incidents, their significance not fully appreciated at the time, with none of the researchers even trying to generalize their findings.

It fell to Diels and Alder to synthesize these disparate threads into a coherent whole. Unlike the earlier researchers, they recognized the generality and predictability of the diene and dienophile combining to form a cyclic structure. Through their systematic investigations, exploring various combinations of dienes and dienophiles, they firmly established the "diene synthesis" as a powerful new synthetic method. Their meticulous work not only demonstrated the reaction's scope and versatility but also laid the groundwork for future theoretical developments, including the Woodward-Hoffmann rules, which would provide a deeper understanding of pericyclic reactions, including the Diels-Alder.

== Applications in total synthesis ==
The Diels–Alder reaction was one step in an early preparation of the steroids cortisone and cholesterol. The reaction involved the addition of butadiene to a quinone.

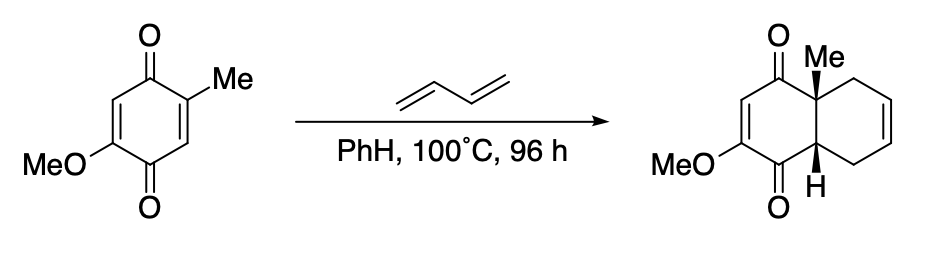
Diels-Alder in the total synthesis of cortisone by R. B. Woodward

Diels–Alder reactions were used in the original synthesis of prostaglandins F2α and E2. The Diels–Alder reaction establishes the relative stereochemistry of three contiguous stereocenters on the prostaglandin cyclopentane core. Activation by Lewis acidic cupric tetrafluoroborate was required.

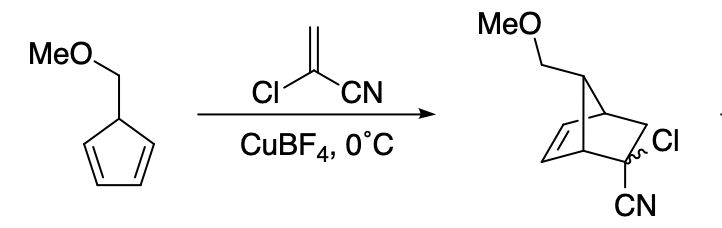

A Diels–Alder reaction was used in the synthesis of disodium prephenate, a biosynthetic precursor of the amino acids phenylalanine and tyrosine.

A synthesis of reserpine uses a Diels–Alder reaction to set the cis-decalin framework of the D and E rings.

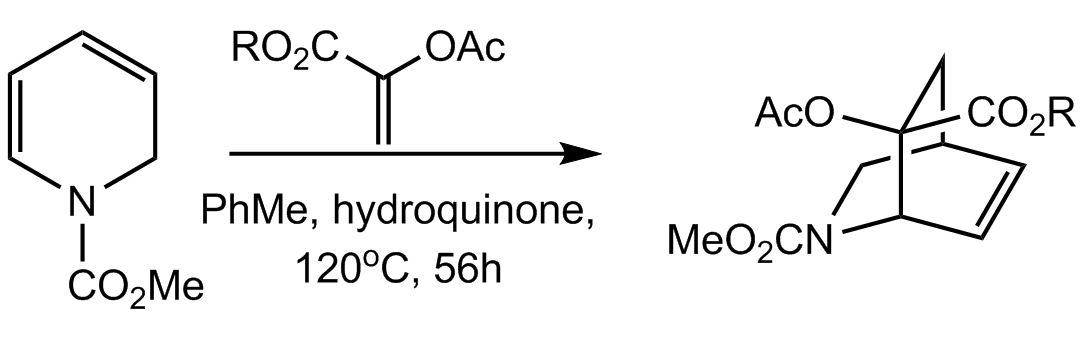

In another synthesis of reserpine, the cis-fused D and E rings was formed by a Diels–Alder reaction. Intramolecular Diels–Alder of the pyranone below with subsequent extrusion of carbon dioxide via a retro [4+2] afforded the bicyclic lactam. Epoxidation from the less hindered α-face, followed by epoxide opening at the less hindered C18 afforded the desired stereochemistry at these positions, while the cis-fusion was achieved with hydrogenation, again proceeding primarily from the less hindered face.

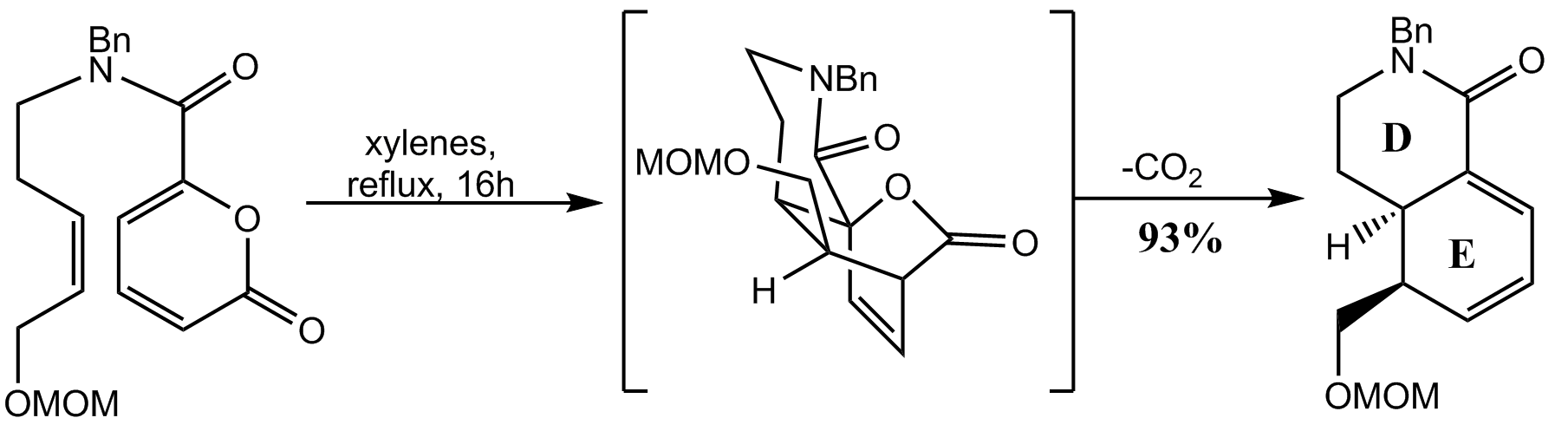

A pyranone was similarly used as the dienophile in the total synthesis of taxol. The intermolecular reaction of the hydroxy-pyrone and α,β–unsaturated ester shown below suffered from poor yield and regioselectivity; however, when directed by phenylboronic acid the desired adduct could be obtained in 61% yield after cleavage of the boronate with neopentyl glycol. The stereospecificity of the Diels–Alder reaction in this instance allowed for the definition of four stereocenters that were carried on to the final product.

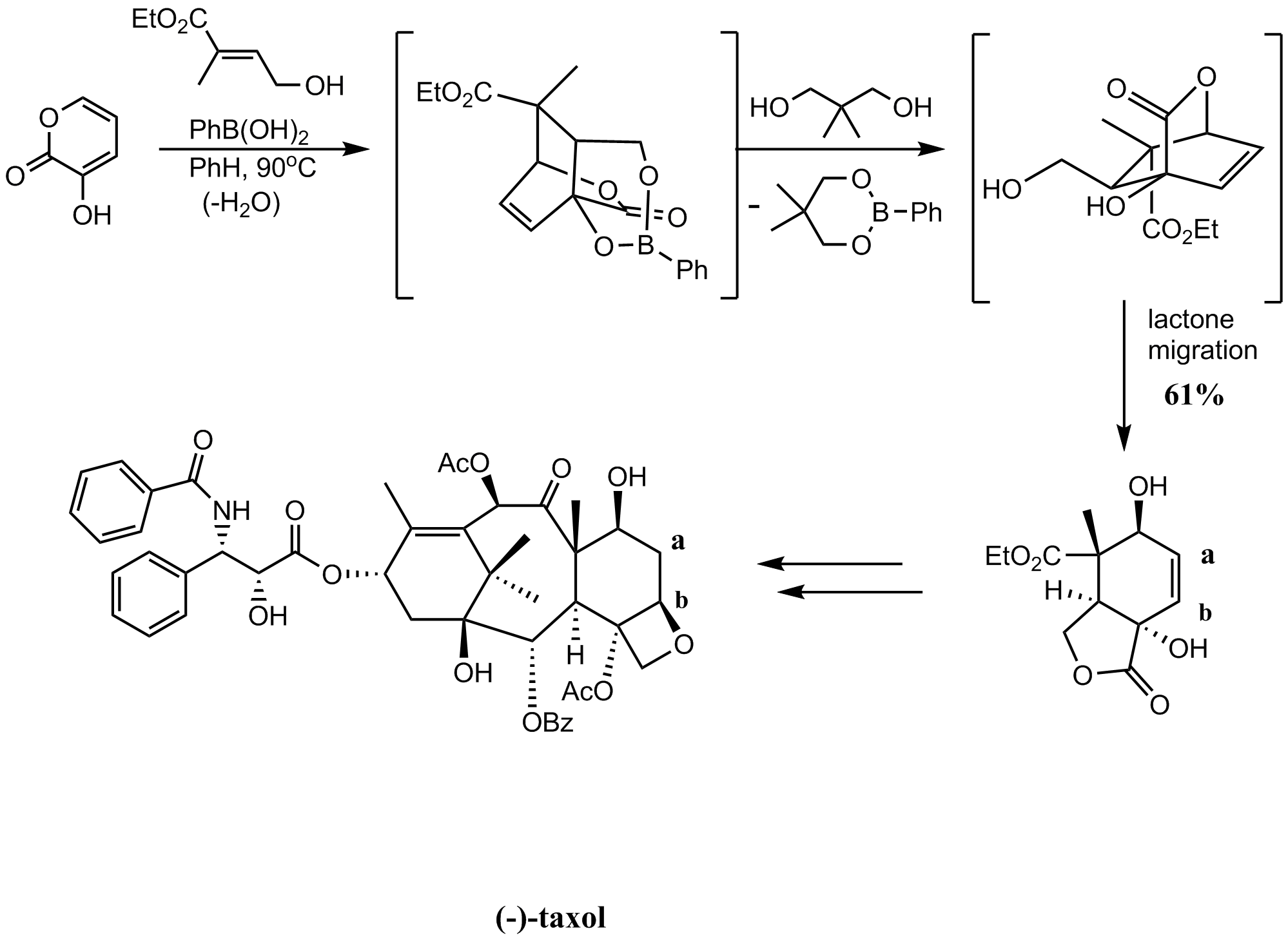

A Diels–Alder reaction is a key step in the synthesis of (-)-furaquinocin C.

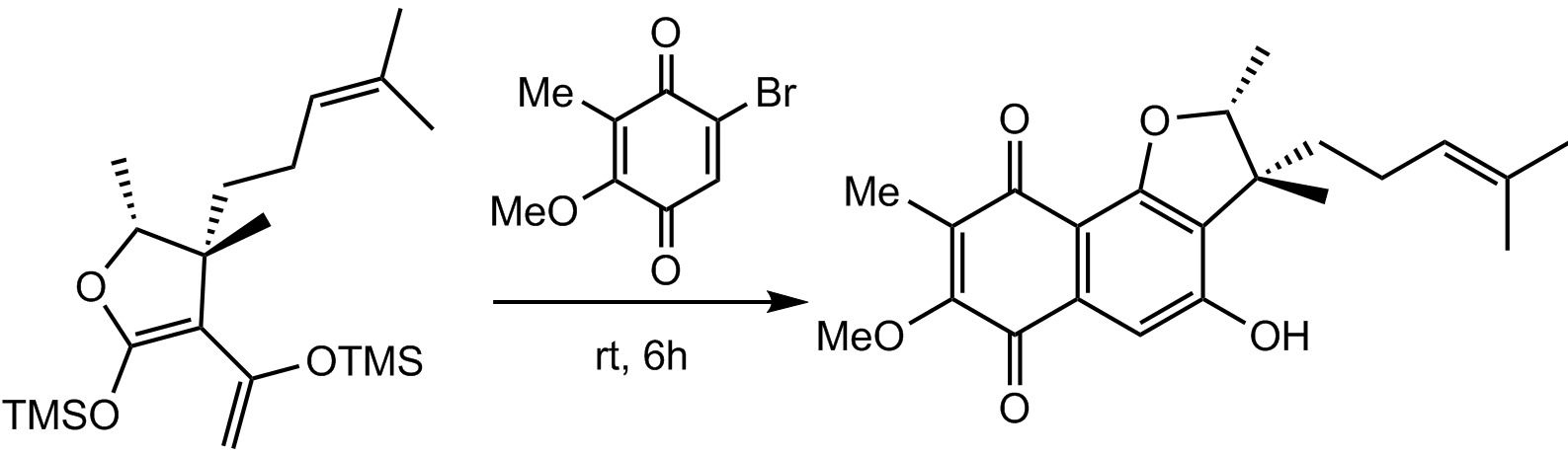

Tabersonine was prepared by a Diels–Alder reaction to establish cis relative stereochemistry of the alkaloid core. Conversion of the cis-aldehyde to its corresponding alkene by Wittig olefination and subsequent ring-closing metathesis with a Schrock catalyst gave the second ring of the alkaloid core. The diene in this instance is notable as an example of a 1-amino-3-siloxybutadiene, otherwise known as a Rawal diene.

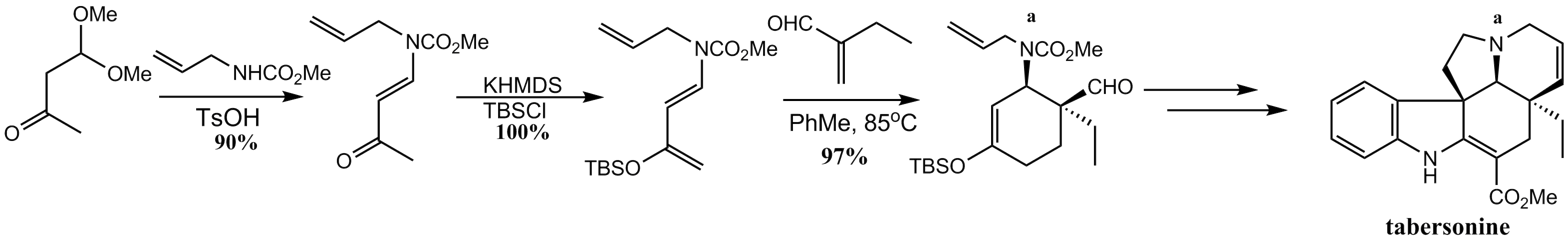

(+)-Sterpurene can be prepared by asymmetric D-A reaction that featured a remarkable intramolecular Diels–Alder reaction of an allene. The [2,3]-sigmatropic rearrangement of the thiophenyl group to give the sulfoxide as below proceeded enantiospecifically due to the predefined stereochemistry of the propargylic alcohol. In this way, the single allene isomer formed could direct the Diels–Alder reaction to occur on only one face of the generated 'diene'.

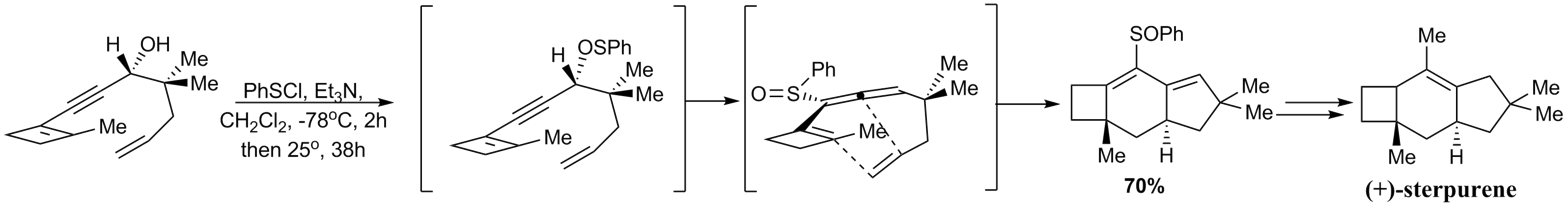

The tetracyclic core of the antibiotic (-)-tetracycline was prepared with a Diels–Alder reaction. Thermally initiated, conrotatory opening of the benzocyclobutene generated the o-quinodimethane, which reacted intermolecularly to give the tetracycline skeleton. The dienophile's free hydroxyl group is integral to the success of the reaction, as hydroxyl-protected variants did not react under several different reaction conditions.

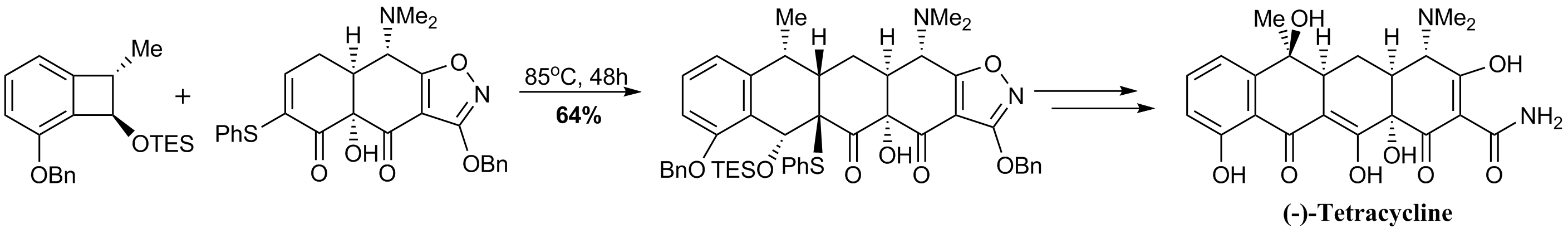

Takemura et al. synthesized cantharidin in 1980 by Diels–Alder reaction, utilizing high pressure.

Synthetic applications of the Diels–Alder reaction have been reviewed extensively.

== See also ==
- Bradsher cycloaddition
- Wagner-Jauregg reaction
- Aza-Diels–Alder reaction

== Bibliography ==
- Carey, Francis A.; Sundberg, Richard J. (2007). Advanced Organic Chemistry: Part B: Reactions and Synthesis (5th ed.). New York: Springer. ISBN 978-0387683546.
