= Proline organocatalysis =

Class of organic chemistry reactions

Proline organocatalysis is the use of proline as an organocatalyst in organic chemistry. This theme is often considered the starting point for the area of organocatalysis, even though early discoveries went unappreciated. Modifications, such as MacMillan’s catalyst and Jorgensen's catalysts, proceed with excellent stereocontrol.

Proline catalysis was initially reported by groups at Schering AG and Hoffmann-La Roche. Proline's chiral structure enables enantioselective synthesis, favoring a particular enantiomer or diastereomer.

== Reactions ==
The Hajos–Parrish–Eder–Sauer–Wiechert reaction, reported in 1971 by several research teams, is an early example of an enantioselective catalytic reaction in organic chemistry. Its scope has been modified and expanded through the development of related reactions including the Michael addition, asymmetric aldol reaction, and the Mannich reaction. This reaction has likewise been used to perform asymmetric Robinson annulations. The general scheme of this reaction follows:

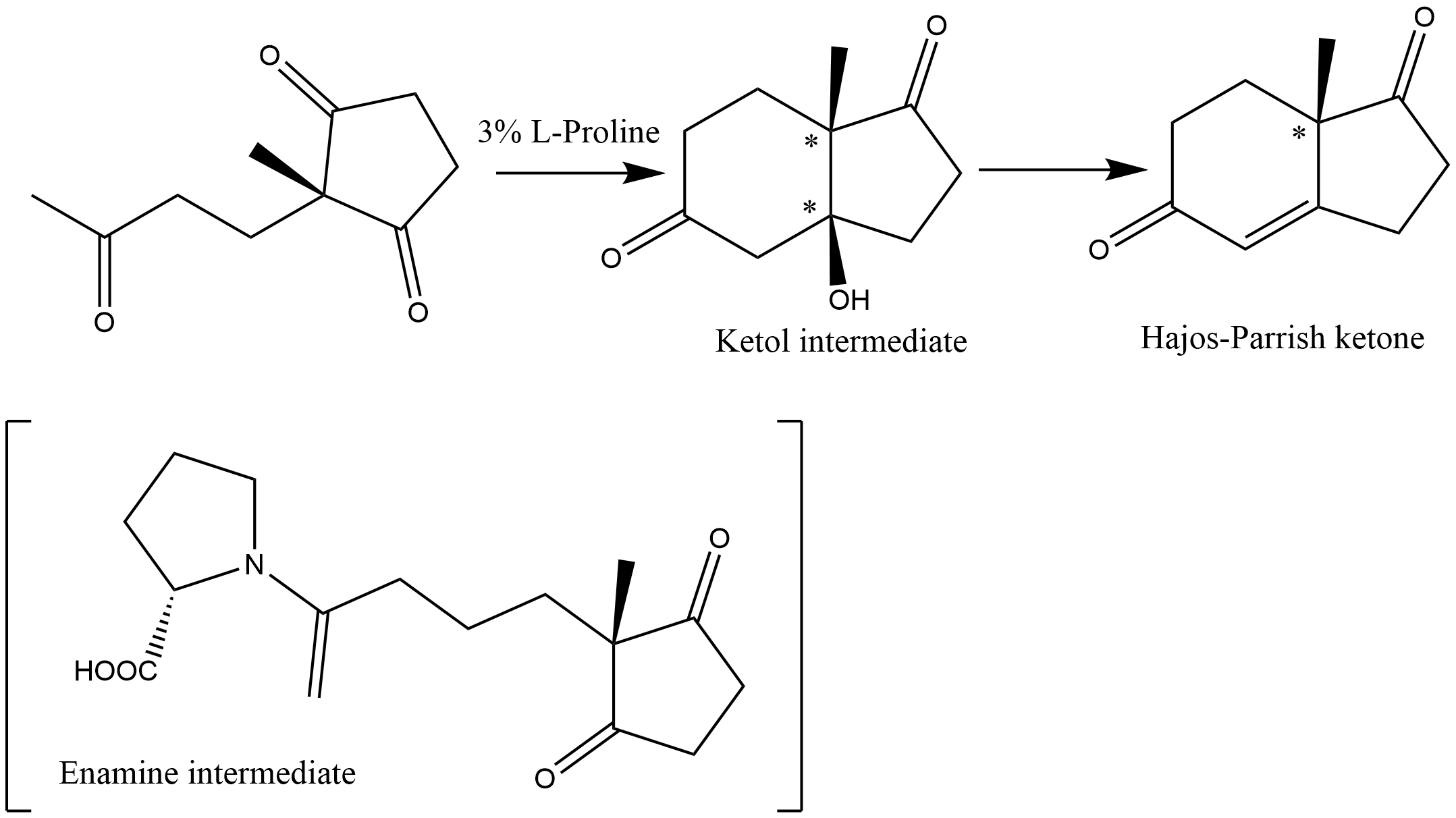
An enantioselective intramolecular aldol reaction.

This example illustrates a proline-catalyzed asymmetric 6-enolendo aldolization. The zwitterionic character and the H-bonding of proline in the transition state determine the reaction outcome. An enamine is formed during the reaction and only one proline molecule is involved in forming the transition state.

Asymmetric synthesis of the Wieland-Miescher ketone is also based on proline. Additional reactions include aldol reactions, Mannich reaction, Michael reaction, amination, α-oxyamination, and α-halogenation.

Modifications on the basic proline structure improved the enantioselectivity and regioselectivity of the catalysis. These proline-derived auxiliaries and catalysts, including the Enders hydrazone reaction and Corey–Itsuno reduction, have been reviewed, as have MacMillan’s iminium catalysts, Miller catalysts, and CBS-oxazaborolidines.

Illustrating an enolexo intramolecular aldolization, dicarbonyl (dials, diketones) can be converted to anti-aldol products with a 10% L-proline catalyst loading.

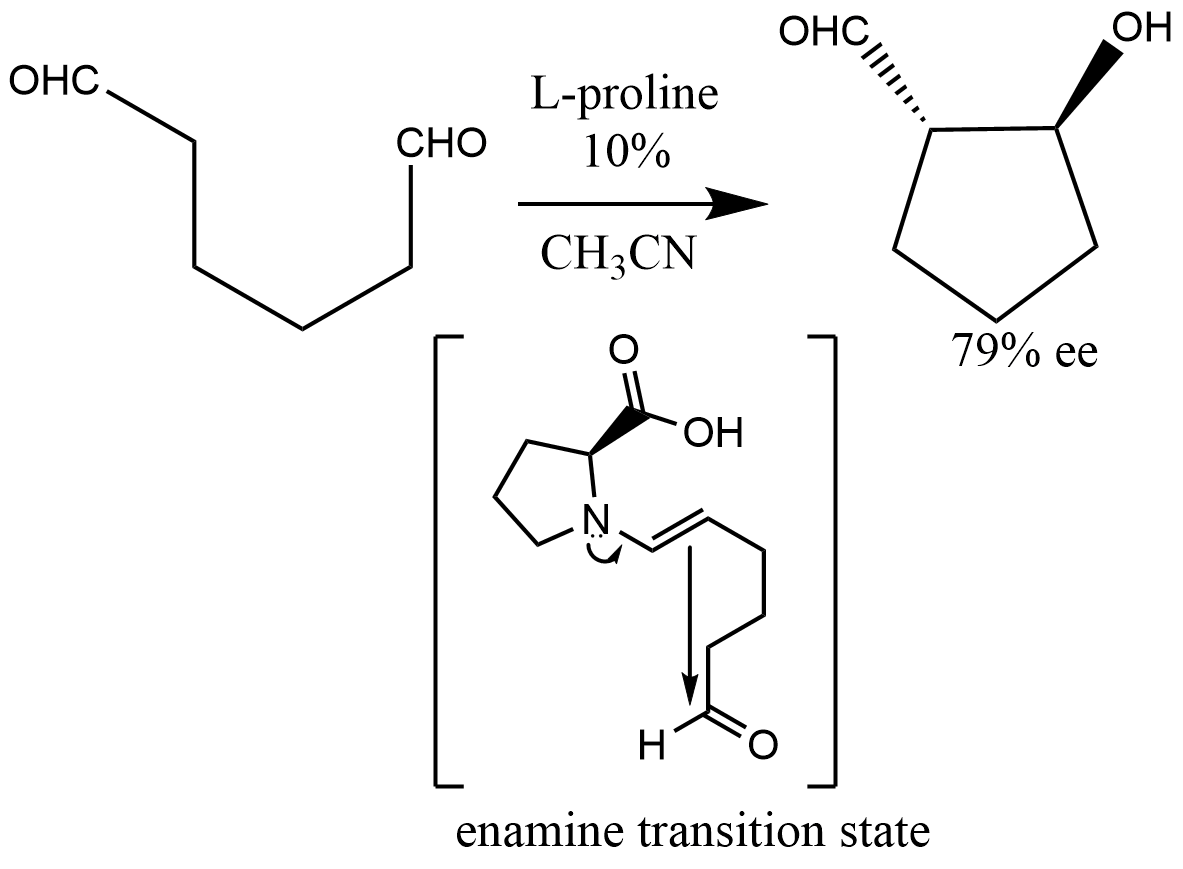
Intramolecular aldolization of a dialdehyde via an enamine intermediate.

A prominent example of proline catalysis is the addition of acetone or hydroxyacetone to a diverse set of aldehydes catalyzed by 20-30% proline catalyst loading with high (>99%) enantioselectivity yielding diol products. As refined by List and Notz, the aforementioned reaction produces diol products as follows:

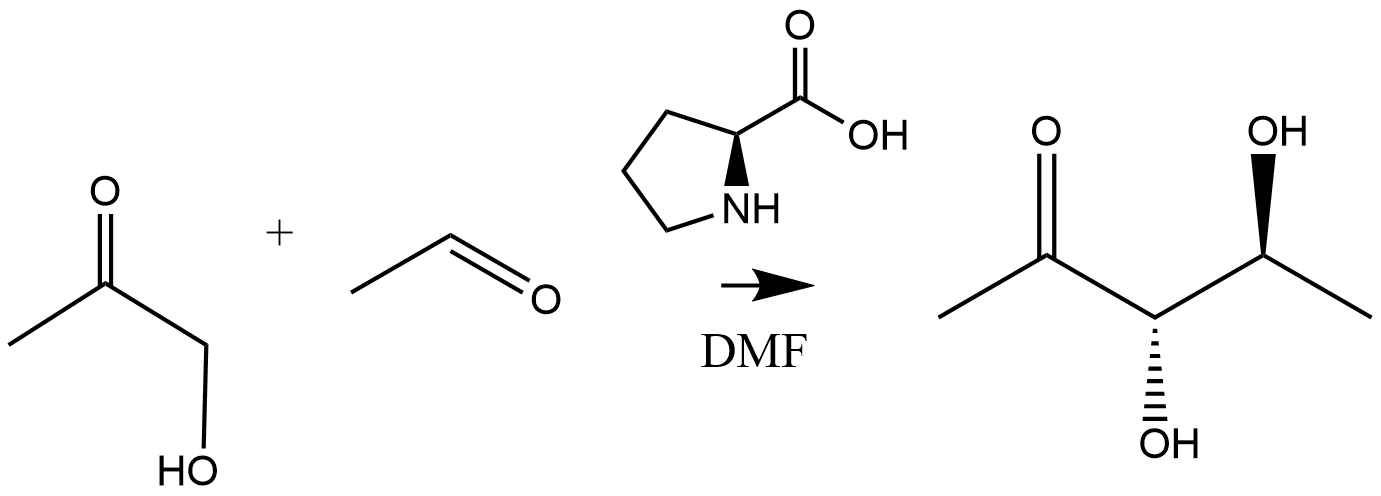
Proline-catalyzed asymmetric aldol reaction

== Mechanistic considerations ==
Proline-catalyzed aldol additions proceed via a six-membered enamine transition state according to the Zimmerman-Traxler model. Addition of 20-30 mol% proline to acetone or hydroxyacetone catalyzes their addition to a diverse set of aldehydes with high (>99%) enantioselectivity yielding diol products. Proline and proline derivatives have been implemented as organocatalysts to promote asymmetric condensation reactions. An example of such a reaction proceeding through a six membered transition state is modelled as follows.

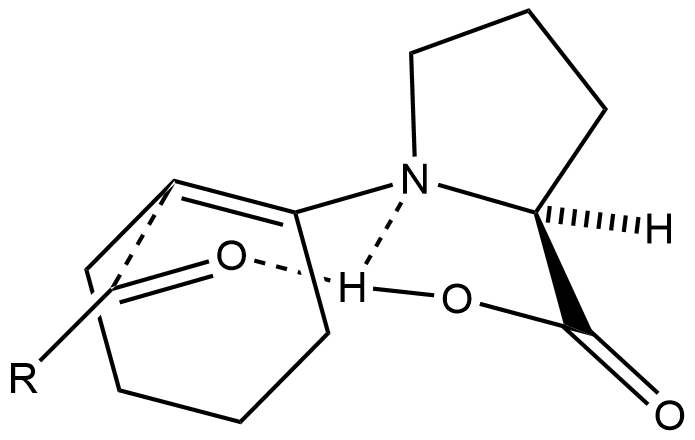
A six-membered transition state in asymmetric proline catalysis.

Intramolecular aldolization reactions that are catalyzed by proline likewise go through six-membered transition states. These transition states can enable the formation of either the enolexo or the enolendo product.

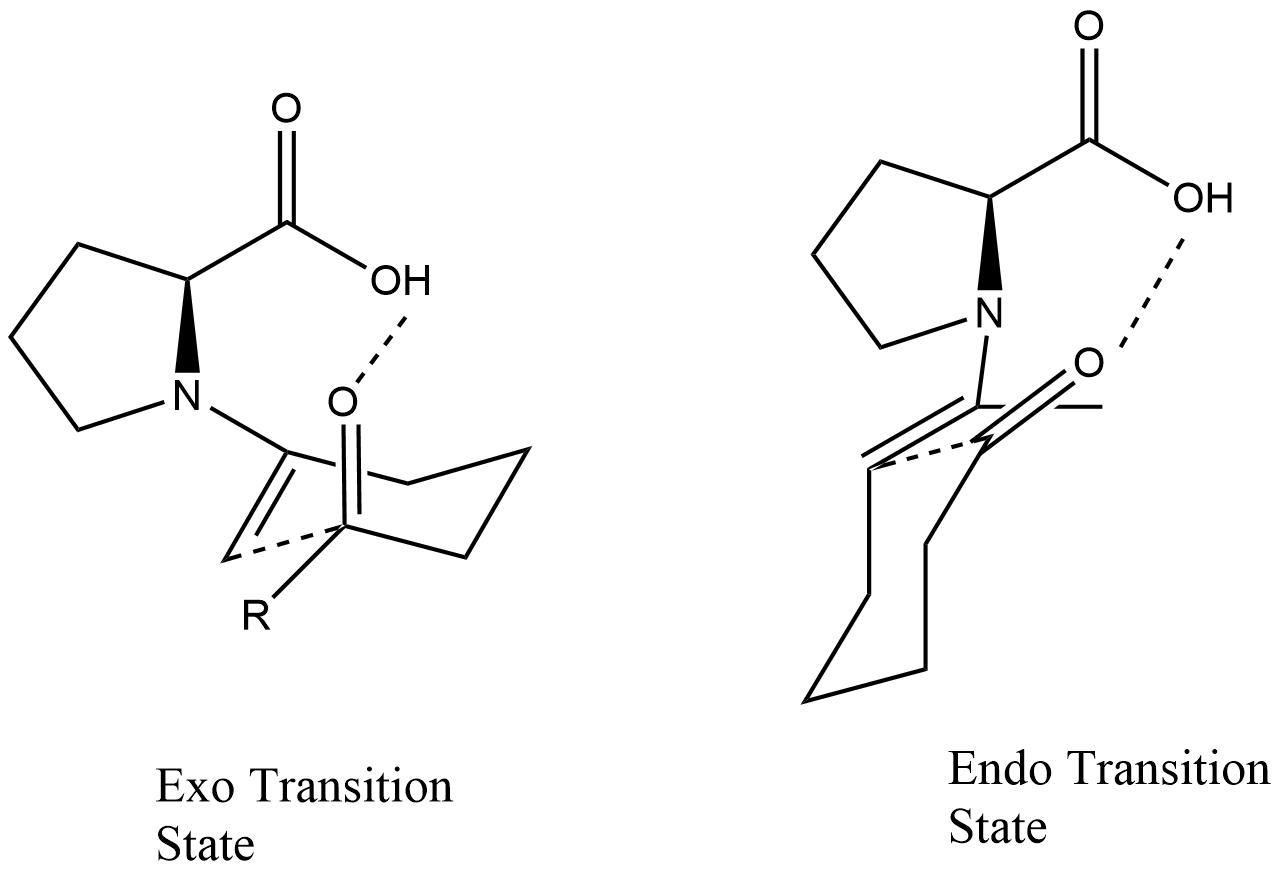
The chair transition state controls, in part, whether the enolexo or the enolendo product forms.
