= Aza-Diels–Alder reaction =

Chemical reaction

Named after	Otto Diels; Kurt Alder
Reaction type	Cycloaddition

Identifiers
RSC ontology ID	RXNO:0000092

The aza-Diels–Alder reaction is a modification of the Diels–Alder reaction wherein a nitrogen replaces sp^{2} carbon. The nitrogen atom can be part of the diene or the dienophile.

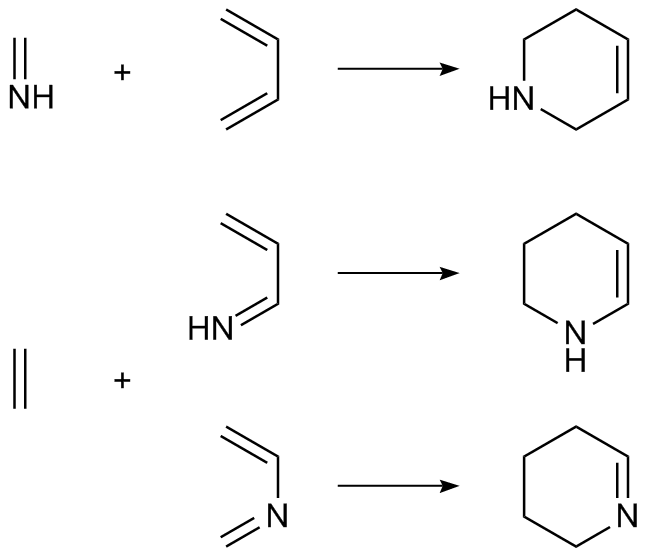
The Aza Diels–Alder reaction, general scope

== Mechanism ==
The aza Diels-Alder reaction may occur either by a concerted or stepwise process. The lowest-energy transition state for the concerted process places the imine lone pair (or coordinated Lewis acid) in an exo position. Thus, (E) imines, in which the lone pair and larger imine carbon substituent are cis, tend to give exo products.

When the imine nitrogen is protonated or coordinated to a strong Lewis acid, the mechanism shifts to a stepwise, Mannich-Michael pathway.

Attaching an electron-withdrawing group to the imine nitrogen increases the rate. The exo isomer usually predominates (particularly when cyclic dienes are used), although selectivities vary.

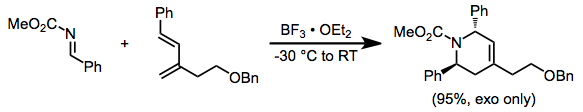

== Scope and limitations ==
=== Stereoselective variants ===
In many cases, cyclic dienes give higher diastereoselectivities than acyclic dienes. Use of amino-acid-based chiral auxiliaries, for instance, leads to good diastereoselectivities in reactions of cyclopentadiene, but not in reactions of acyclic dienes.

=== Asymmetric variants ===
Chiral auxiliaries have been employed on either the imino nitrogen or imino carbon to effect diastereoselection.

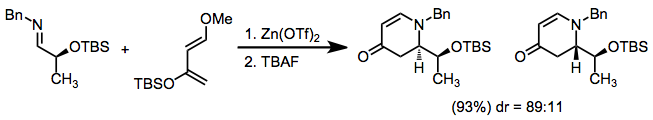

In the enantioselective Diels–Alder reaction of an aniline, formaldehyde and a cyclohexenone catalyzed by (S)-proline even the diene is masked.

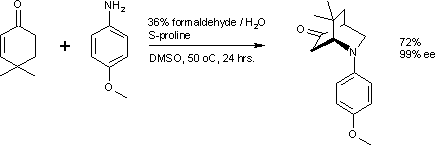
S-proline enantioselective Aza Diels–Alder reaction

=== In situ generated imines ===
The imine is often generated in situ from an amine and formaldehyde. An example is the reaction of cyclopentadiene with benzylamine to an aza norbornene.

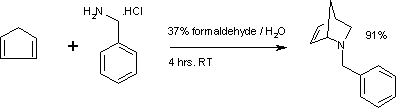

The catalytic cycle starts with the reactions of the aromatic amine with formaldehyde to the imine and the reaction of the ketone with proline to the diene. The second step, an endo trig cyclisation, is driven to one of the two possible enantiomers (99% ee) because the imine nitrogen atom forms a hydrogen bond with the carboxylic acid group of proline on the Si face. Hydrolysis of the final complex releases the product and regenerates the catalyst.

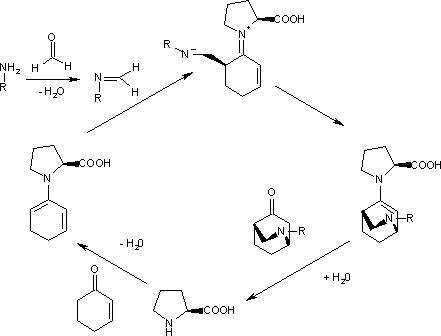
catalytic cycle for S-proline enantioselective Aza Diels–Alder reaction

Tosylimines may be generated in situ from tosylisocyanate and aldehydes. Cycloadditions of these intermediates with dienes give single constitutional isomers, but proceed with moderate stereoselectivity.

Lewis-acid catalyzed reactions of sulfonyl imines also exhibit moderate stereoselectivity.

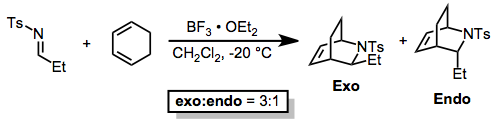

Simple unactivated imines react with hydrocarbon dienes only with the help of a Lewis acid; however, both electron-rich and electron-poor dienes react with unactivated imines when heated. Vinylketenes, for instance, afford dihydropyridones upon [4+2] cycloaddition with imines. Regio- and stereoselectivity are unusually high in reactions of this class of dienes.

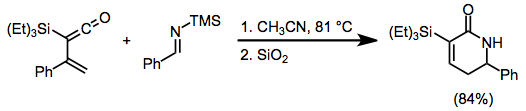

Vinylallenes react similarly in the presence of a Lewis acid, often with high diastereoselectivity.

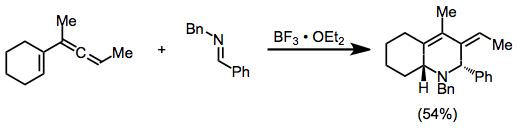

=== Acyliminium substrates ===
Acyliminium ions also participate in cycloadditions. These cations are generated by removal of chloride from chloromethylated amides:

RCONRCH_{2}Cl → RCONR=CH^{+}_{2} + Cl^{−}

The resulting acyl iminium cations serve as heterodienes as well as dienophile.

=== Use in natural products synthesis ===
The aza-Diels–Alder reaction has been applied to the synthesis of a number of alkaloid natural products. Danishefsky's diene is used to form a six-membered ring en route to phyllanthine.

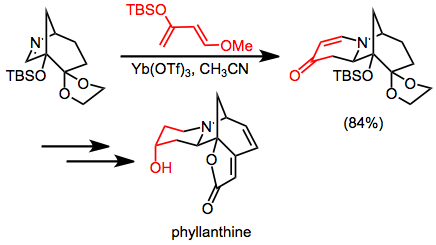

== See also ==
- Oxo-Diels–Alder reaction
