= Anthracene–maleic anhydride adduct =

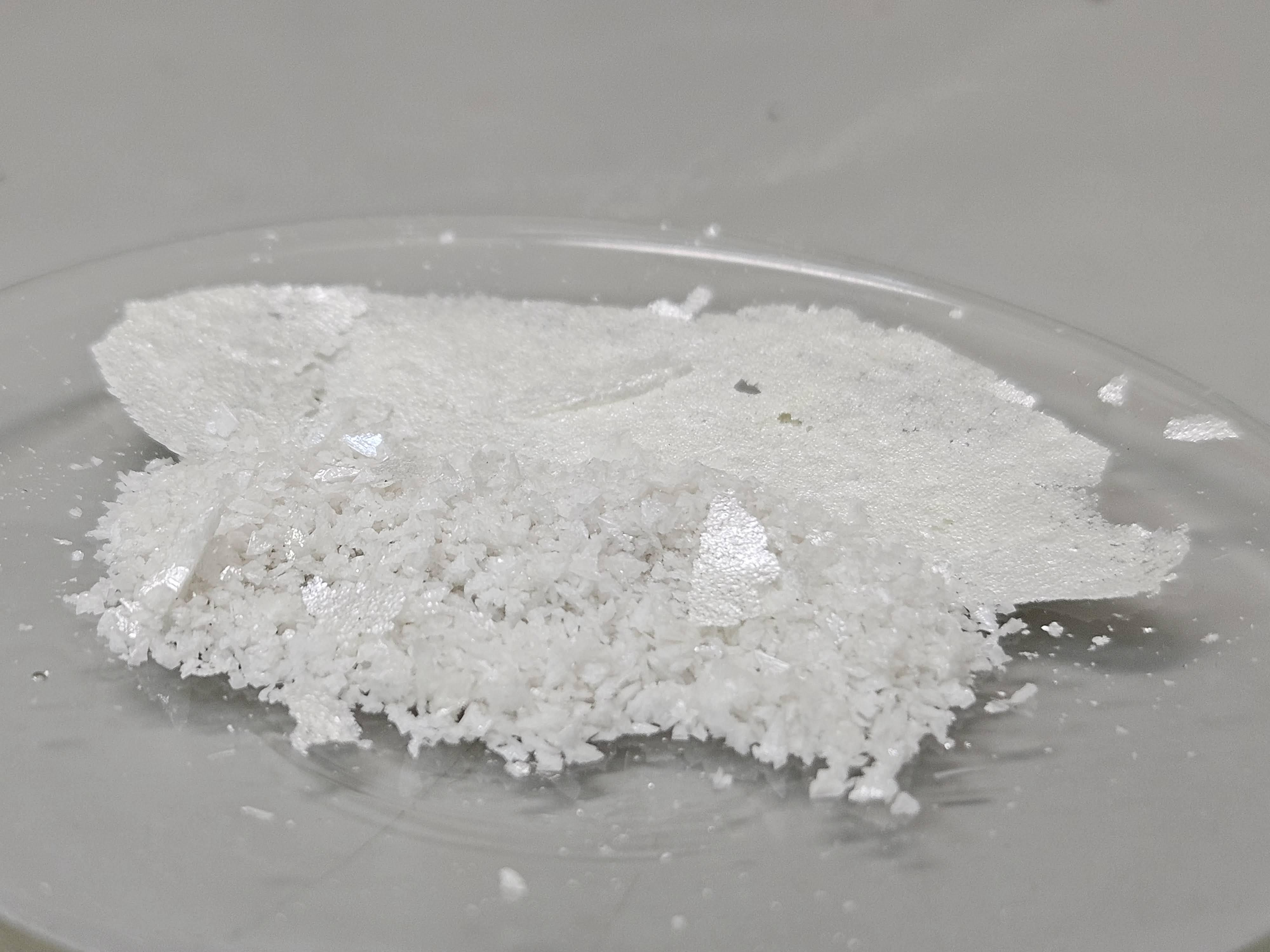

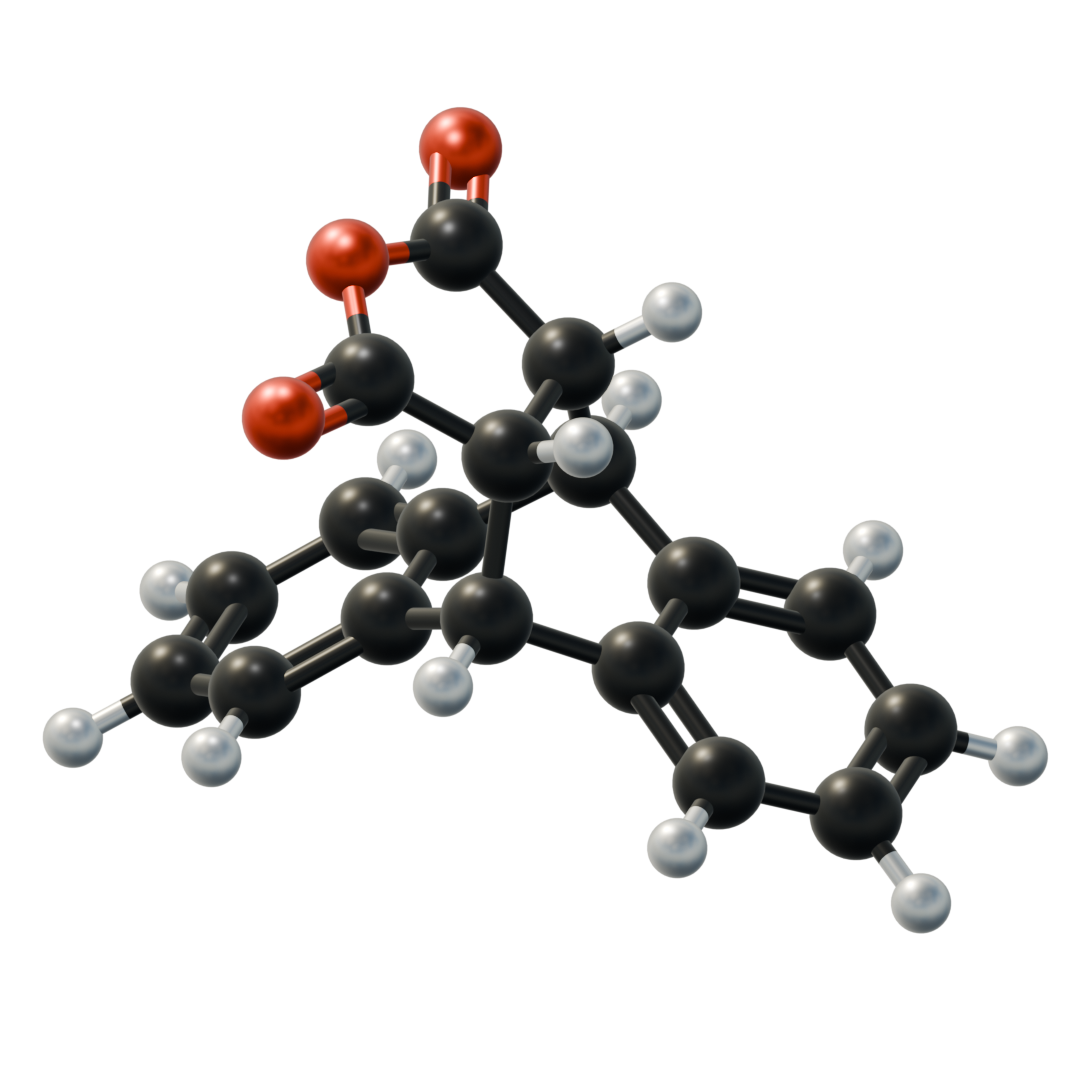

Names
- Systematic IUPAC name (15S,19R)-17-oxapentacyclo[6.6.5.0^{2,7}.0^{9,14}.0^{15,19}]nonadeca-2,4,6,9,11,13-hexaene-16,18-dione
- Other names: 9,10-dihydroanthracene-9,10-endo-α,β-succinic anhydride; endo-9,10-(α,β-Succinic anhydride)anthracene; 9,10-Ethanoanthracene-11,12-dicarboxylic anhydride; Dibenzobarallene

Identifiers
CAS Number	5443-16-3
3D model (JSmol)	Interactive image
PubChem CID	11807956
- InChI: InChI=1S/C18H12O3/c19-17-15-13-9-5-1-2-6-10(9)14(16(15)18(20)21-17)12-8-4-3-7-11(12)13/h1-8,13-16H/t13?,14?,15-,16+ Key: PSKVQQJLLWSBFV-STONLHKKSA-N
- SMILES: C1=CC=C2C3[C@@H]4[C@H](C(C2=C1)C5=CC=CC=C35)C(=O)OC4=O

Properties
Chemical formula	C_{18}H_{12}O_{3}
Molar mass	276.291 g·mol^{−1}
Appearance	Colorless crystals
Melting point	262 °C (504 °F; 535 K)

Structure
Crystal structure	Monoclinic
Space group	Cc
Lattice constant	a = 15.410 Å, b = 9.4020 Å, c = 11.0930 Å α = 90°, β = 124.235°, γ = 90°
- Except where otherwise noted, data are given for materials in their standard state (at 25 °C [77 °F], 100 kPa). Infobox references

The anthracene–maleic anhydride adduct is an organic compound and an example of a Diels–Alder adduct. It is commonly prepared in organic chemistry teaching laboratories as an example of the Diels–Alder reaction.

== Preparation ==
The anthracene–maleic anhydride adduct may be prepared by the reaction of equimolar amounts of anthracene and maleic anhydride in refluxing xylenes:

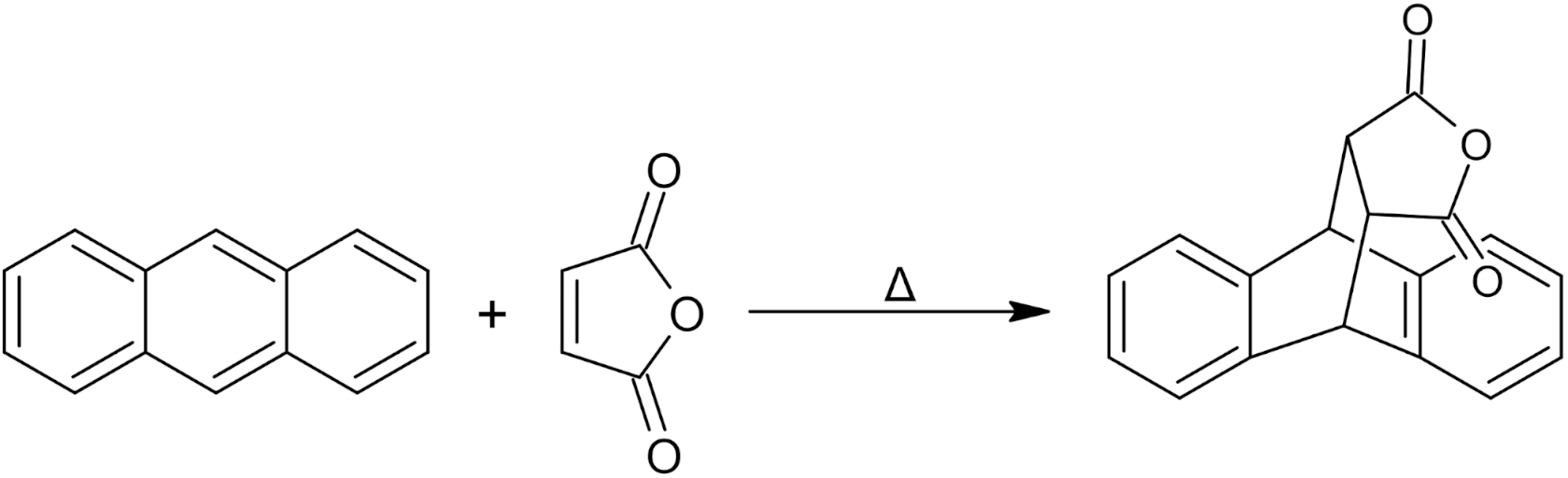

The product crystallizes from the reaction mixture upon cooling.

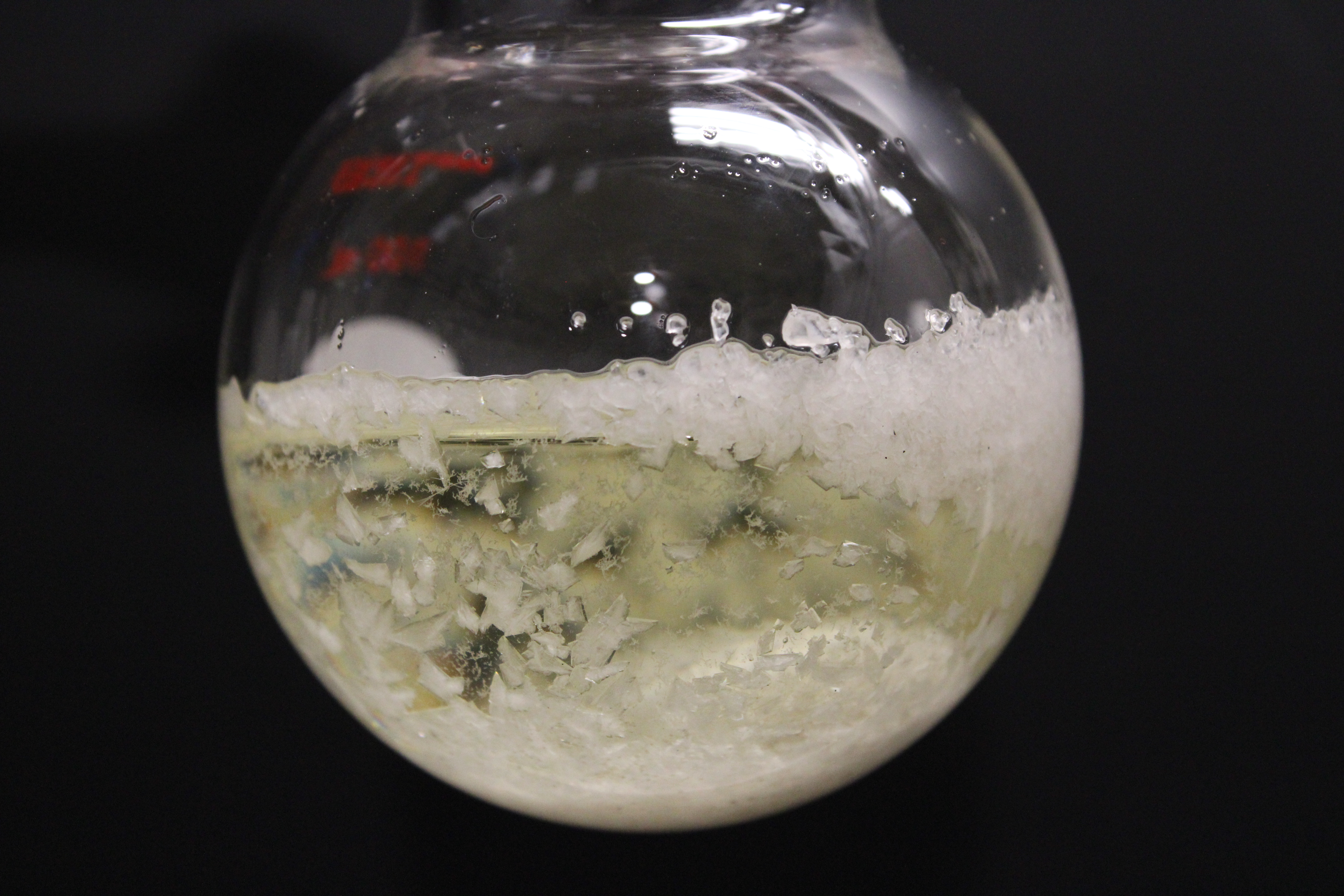
Crystallization of anthracene–maleic anhydride adduct.
