= Danishefsky's diene =

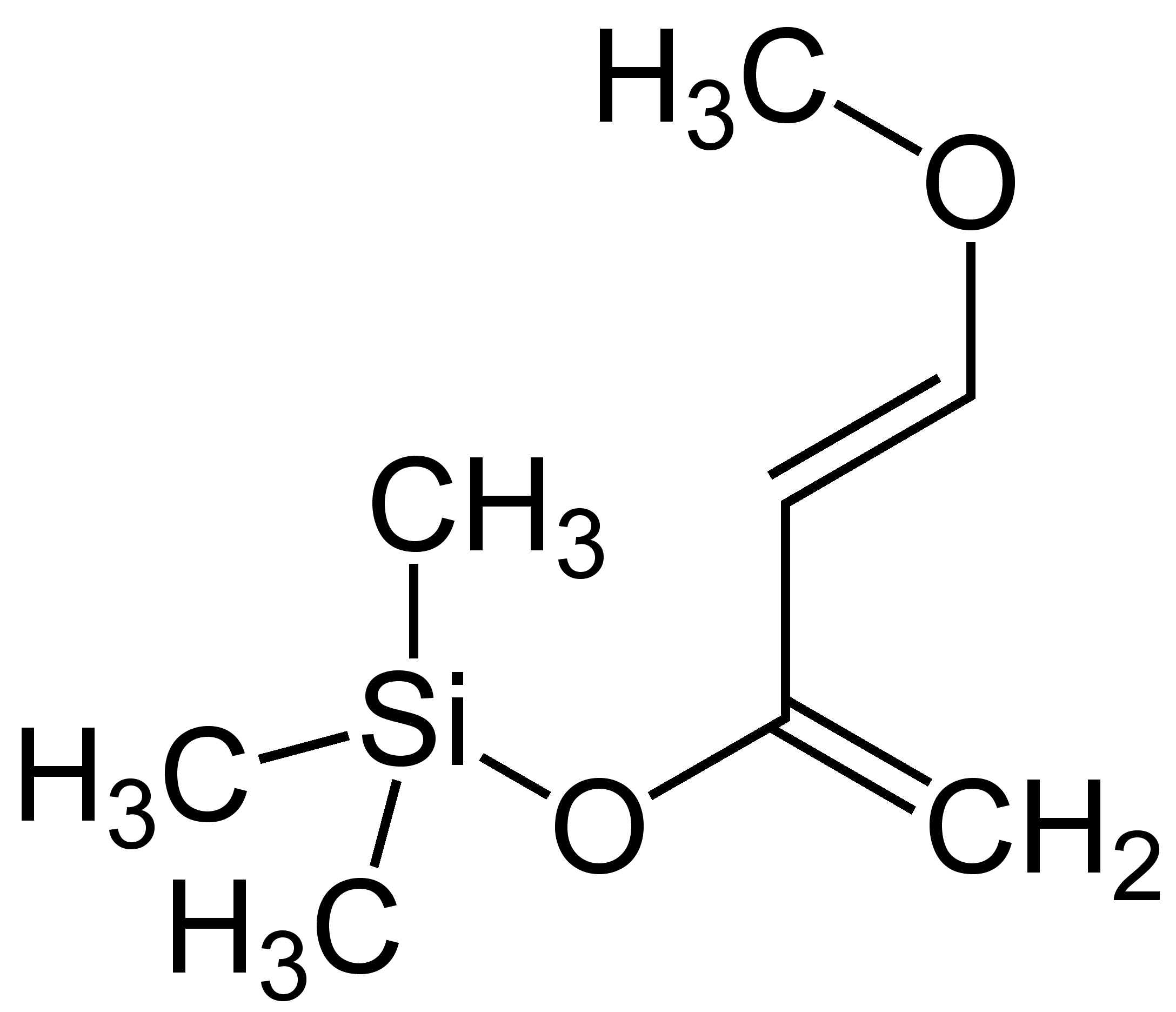

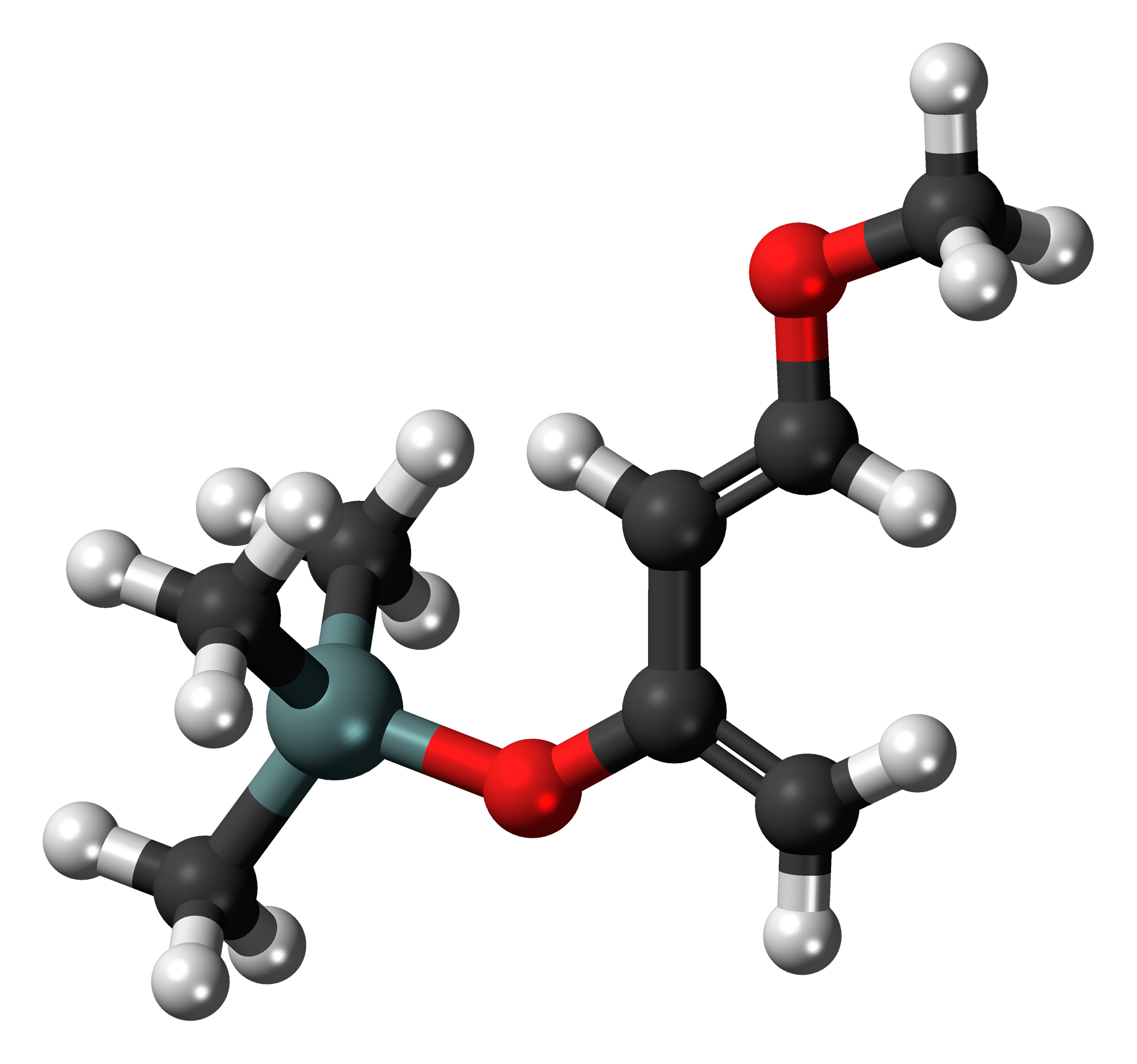

Names
- Preferred IUPAC name {[(3E)-4-Methoxybuta-1,3-dien-2-yl]oxy}trimethylsilane
- Other names: Kitahara diene; trans-1-Methoxy-3-trimethylsilyloxy-buta-1,3-diene; (E)-1-Methoxy-3-trimethylsilyloxy-buta-1,3-diene

Identifiers
CAS Number	54125-02-9
3D model (JSmol)	Interactive image
ChemSpider	4518295
ECHA InfoCard	100.157.252
EC Number	261-753-0
PubChem CID	5366448
UNII	1ZOR63U51O
CompTox Dashboard (EPA)	DTXSID10202472
- InChI: InChI=1S/C8H16O2Si/c1-8(6-7-9-2)10-11(3,4)5/h6-7H,1H2,2-5H3/b7-6+ Key: SHALBPKEGDBVKK-VOTSOKGWSA-N; InChI=1/C8H16O2Si/c1-8(6-7-9-2)10-11(3,4)5/h6-7H,1H2,2-5H3/b7-6+ Key: SHALBPKEGDBVKK-VOTSOKGWBD
- SMILES: O(\C=C\C(O[Si](C)(C)C)=C)C

Properties
Chemical formula	C_{8}H_{16}O_{2}Si
Molar mass	172.299 g·mol^{−1}
Density	0.89 g cm^{−3} (20 °C)
Boiling point	68 to 69 °C (154 to 156 °F; 341 to 342 K) at 0.0189 kPa

Hazards
- GHS labelling
Pictograms	(GHS02: Flammable) (GHS07: Exclamation mark)
Signal word	Warning
Hazard statements	H226, H315, H319
Precautionary statements	P210, P233, P240, P241, P242, P243, P264, P280, P302+P352, P303+P361+P353, P305+P351+P338, P321, P332+P313, P337+P313, P362, P370+P378, P403+P235, P501
- Except where otherwise noted, data are given for materials in their standard state (at 25 °C [77 °F], 100 kPa). verify (what is ?) Infobox references

Danishefsky's diene (Kitahara diene) is an organosilicon compound and a diene with the systematic name trans-1-methoxy-3-trimethylsilyloxy-buta-1,3-diene named after Samuel J. Danishefsky. Each of the two alkene regions is an enol ether, making the diene very electron-rich. It is a very reactive reagent in Diels–Alder reactions, reacting rapidly with electrophilic alkenes, such as maleic anhydride. The methoxy group promotes high regioselectivity in addition reactions. The diene is known to react with amines, aldehydes, alkenes and alkynes. Reactions with imines and nitro-olefins have been reported.

It was first synthesized by the reaction of trimethylsilyl chloride with 4-methoxy-3-buten-2-one and zinc chloride:

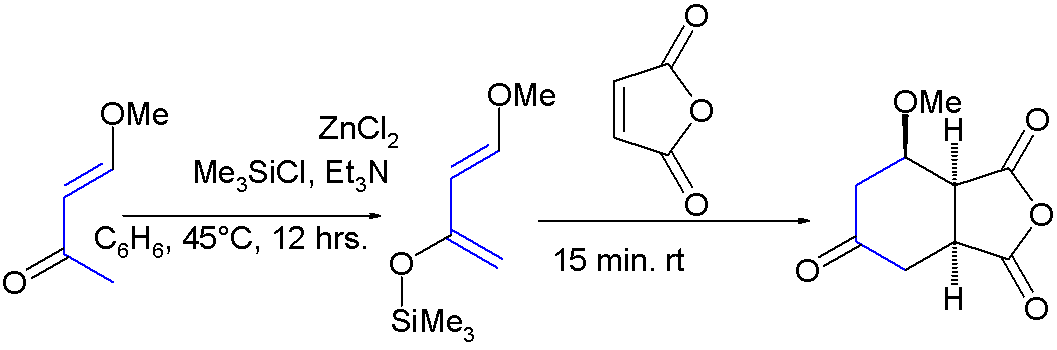
Danishefsky's diene

The diene has two features of interest: the substituents promote regiospecific addition to unsymmetrical dienophiles and the resulting adduct is amenable to further functional group manipulations after the addition reaction. High regioselectivity is obtained with unsymmetrical alkenes with a preference for a 1,2-relation of the ether group with the electron-deficient alkene-carbon. All this is exemplified in this aza-Diels–Alder reaction:

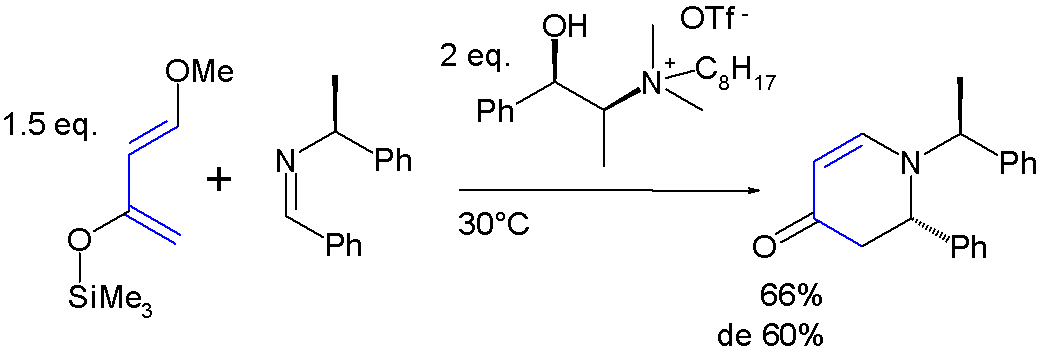
Danishefsky's diene in Aza-Diels_Alder

In the cycloaddition product, the silyl ether is a synthon for a carbonyl group through the enol. The methoxy group is susceptible to an elimination reaction enabling the formation of a new alkene group.

Applications in asymmetric synthesis have been reported. Derivatives have been reported.
