= Oxo-Diels–Alder reaction =

Chemical reaction

Named after	Otto Diels; Kurt Alder
Reaction type	Cycloaddition

Identifiers
RSC ontology ID	RXNO:0000310

An oxo-Diels–Alder reaction (also called an oxa-Diels–Alder reaction) is an organic reaction and a variation of the Diels–Alder reaction in which a suitable diene reacts with an aldehyde to form a dihydropyran ring. This reaction is of some importance to synthetic organic chemistry.

The oxo-DA reaction was first reported in 1949 using a 2-methylpenta-1,3-diene and formaldehyde as reactants.

Asymmetric oxo-DA reactions (including catalytic reactions) are well known. Many strategies rely on coordinating a chiral Lewis acid to the carbonyl group.

== See also ==
- Aza-Diels–Alder reaction
