= Wagner-Jauregg reaction =

Chemical reaction

The Wagner-Jauregg reaction is a classic organic reaction in organic chemistry, named after Theodor Wagner-Jauregg (son of Julius Wagner-Jauregg), describing the double Diels–Alder reaction of 2 equivalents of maleic anhydride with a 1,1-diarylethylene. After aromatization of the bis-adduct, the ultimate reaction product is a naphthalene compound with one phenyl substituent.

The reaction is unusual in that the anhydride reacts with the aromatic ring. The presence of the additional alpha-phenyl group on the phenylethene (the styryl group) activates the styryl for a Diels–Alder reaction even at the expense of its aromaticity. In contrast, unactivated styrene reacts instead at the alkene alone via a linear polymerization reaction. Styrene maleic anhydride copolymer is formed, retaining the aromaticity of the styrene.

The Diels–Alder product can be re-aromatized using elemental sulfur at high temperature, followed by a second rearomatization by decarboxylation with barium hydroxide and copper:

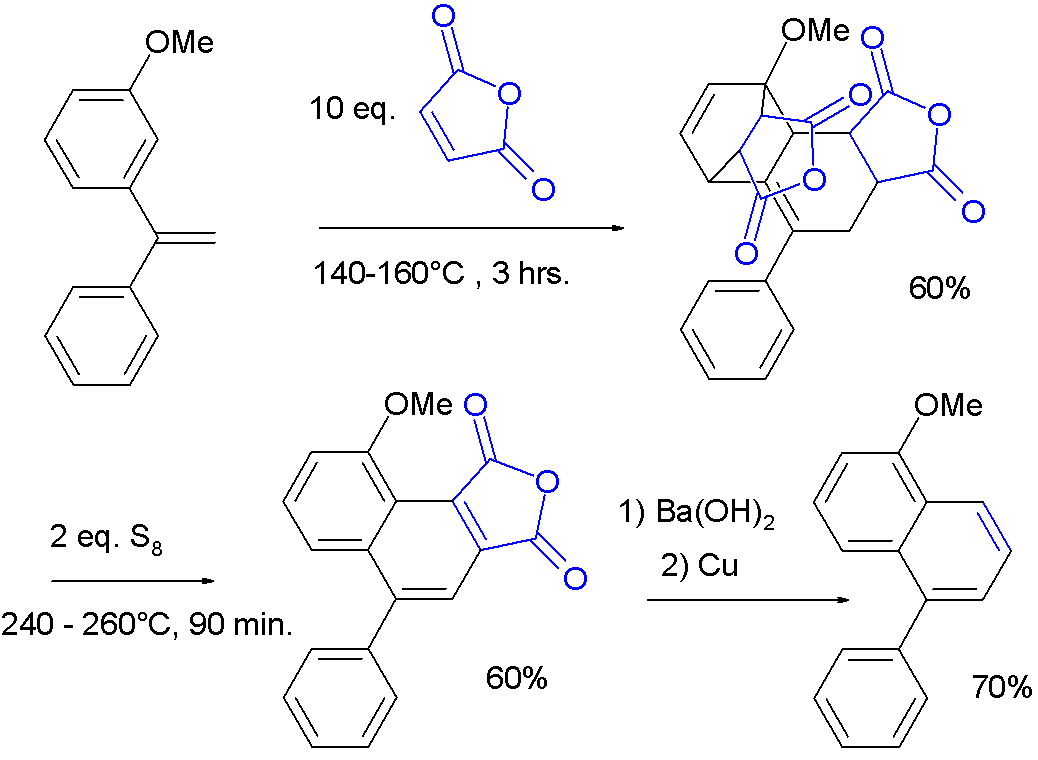
Wagner-Jauregg reaction
