= (R)-2-Methyl-CBS-oxazaborolidine =

Names
- Preferred IUPAC name (3aR)-1-Methyl-3,3-diphenyltetrahydro-1H,3H-pyrrolo[1,2-c][1,3,2]oxazaborole
- Other names (R)-Methyl oxazaborolidine; (R)-(+)-2-methyl-CBS-oxazaborolidine

Identifiers
CAS Number	112022-83-0
3D model (JSmol)	Interactive image
ChemSpider	8014210
ECHA InfoCard	100.103.901
EC Number	601-151-0
PubChem CID	9838490
UNII	4WZ68942D5
CompTox Dashboard (EPA)	DTXSID40920652
- InChI: InChI=1S/C18H20BNO/c1-19-20-14-8-13-17(20)18(21-19,15-9-4-2-5-10-15)16-11-6-3-7-12-16/h2-7,9-12,17H,8,13-14H2,1H3/t17-/m1/s1 Key: VCDGSBJCRYTLNU-AZWGFFAPSA-N; InChI=1/C18H20BNO/c1-19-20-14-8-13-17(20)18(21-19,15-9-4-2-5-10-15)16-11-6-3-7-12-16/h2-7,9-12,17H,8,13-14H2,1H3/t17-/m1/s1 Key: VCDGSBJCRYTLNU-AZWGFFAPBY
- SMILES: O2B(N1CCC[C@@H]1C2(c3ccccc3)c4ccccc4)C

Properties
Chemical formula	C_{18}H_{20}BNO
Molar mass	277.17 g·mol^{−1}
Appearance	Colorless to pale yellow liquid (in toluene)
Density	0.95 g/mL
Melting point	85 to 95 °C (185 to 203 °F; 358 to 368 K)
Boiling point	111 °C (232 °F; 384 K)

Hazards
- GHS labelling
Pictograms	(GHS05: Corrosive) (GHS07: Exclamation mark)
Signal word	Danger
Hazard statements	H302, H318
Precautionary statements	P264, P264+P265, P270, P280, P301+P317, P305+P354+P338, P317, P330, P501
- Except where otherwise noted, data are given for materials in their standard state (at 25 °C [77 °F], 100 kPa). verify (what is ?) Infobox references

(R)-2-Methyl-CBS-oxazaborolidine is an organoboron catalyst that is used in organic synthesis. This catalyst, developed by Shinichi Itsuno and Elias James Corey, is generated by heating (R)-(+)-2-(diphenylhydroxymethyl) pyrrolidine along with trimethylboroxine or methylboronic acid. It is an excellent tool for the synthesis of alcohols in high enantiomeric ratio. Generally, 2-10 mol% of this catalyst is used along with borane-tetrahydrofuran (THF), borane-dimethylsulfide, borane-N,N-diethylaniline, or diborane as the borane source. Enantioselective reduction using chiral oxazaborolidine catalysts has been used in the synthesis of commercial drugs such as ezetimibe and aprepitant.

== See also ==
- CBS catalyst
- Corey-Itsuno reduction
