= Transition metal alkene complex =

Coordination compound

In organometallic chemistry, a transition metal alkene complex is a coordination compound containing one or more alkene ligands. The inventory is large. Such compounds are intermediates in many catalytic reactions that convert alkenes to other organic products.

== Monoalkenes ==
Complexes of ethylene are particularly common. Examples include Zeise's salt (see figure), Rh_{2}Cl_{2}(C_{2}H_{4})_{4}, Cp*_{2}Ti(C_{2}H_{4}), and Pt(P(C_{6}H_{5})_{3})_{2}(C_{2}H_{4}).

Homoleptic alkene-complexes are well known but often are highly reactive. Examples include Ni(C_{2}H_{4})_{3}, [Co(C_{2}H_{4})_{4}]^{−}, and [Fe(C_{2}H_{4})_{4}]^{2−}.

Substituted monoalkenes are common ligands. Cyclooctene is found in chlorobis(cyclooctene)rhodium dimer. Alkenes with electron-withdrawing groups commonly bind strongly to low-valent metals. Examples of such ligands are TCNE, tetrafluoroethylene, maleic anhydride, and esters of fumaric acid. These acceptors form adducts with many zero-valent metals.

== Dienes, trienes, and related ligands ==
Butadiene, cyclooctadiene, and norbornadiene are well-studied chelating agents. Trienes and even some tetraenes can bind to metals through several adjacent carbon centers. Common examples of such ligands are cycloheptatriene and cyclooctatetraene. The bonding is often denoted using the hapticity formalism. Keto-alkenes are tetrahapto ligands that stabilize highly unsaturated low valent metals as found in (benzylideneacetone)iron tricarbonyl and tris(dibenzylideneacetone)dipalladium(0). Cyclododecatriene can serve as a ligand, with each of the three alkenes serving as a pi donor. Both the all-cis and all-trans nickel(0) complexes are known.

Metal alkene complexes.

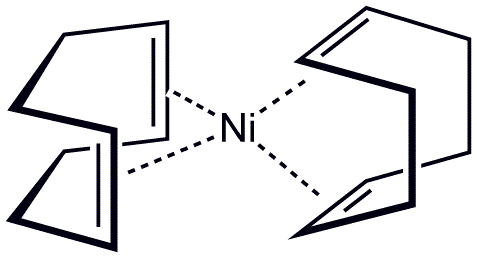
Bis(cyclooctadiene)nickel(0), a catalyst and source of "naked nickel."

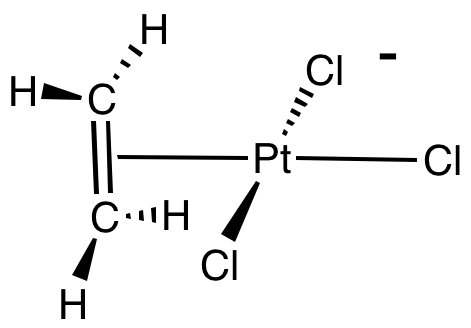
The first alkene complex, the anion in Zeise's salt.

Chlorobis(cyclooctene)rhodium dimer, source of "RhCl".

Crabtree's catalyst, a very active catalyst for hydrogenation.

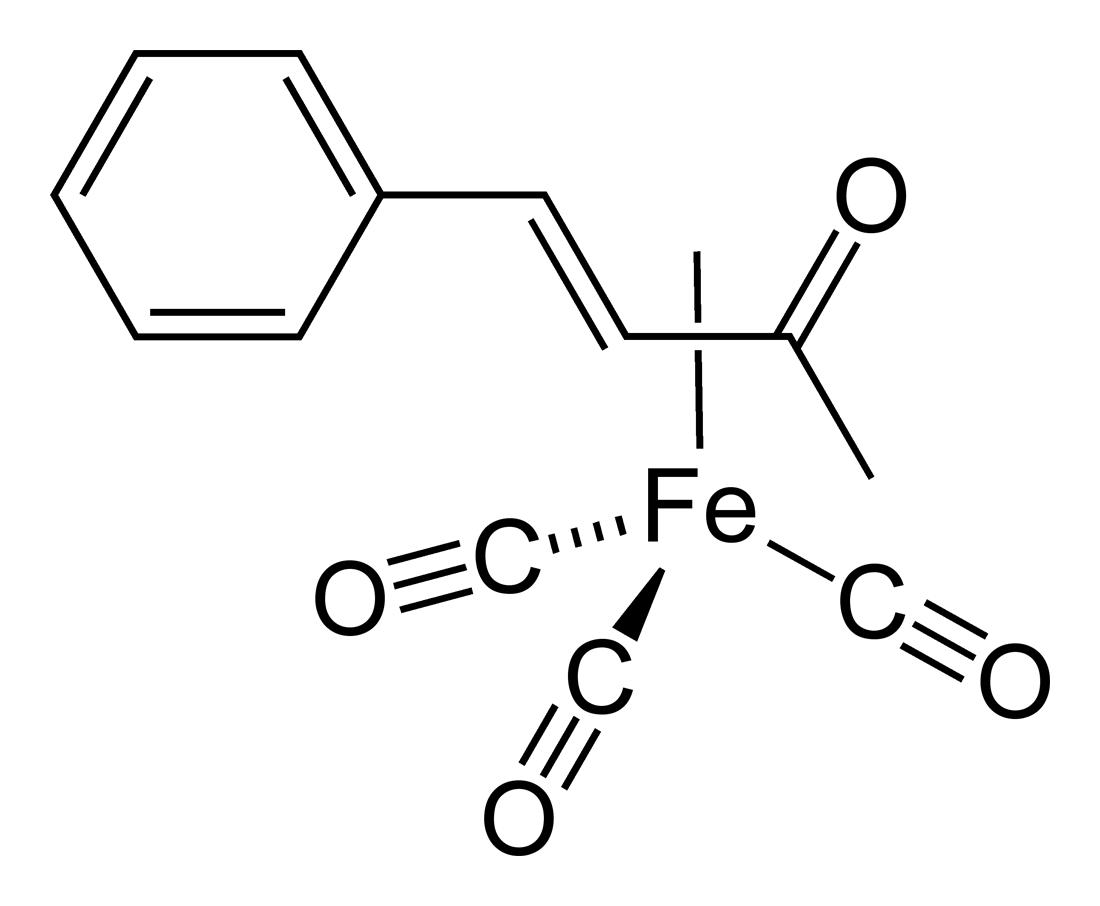
(Benzylideneacetone)iron tricarbonyl, source of "Fe(CO)_{3}".

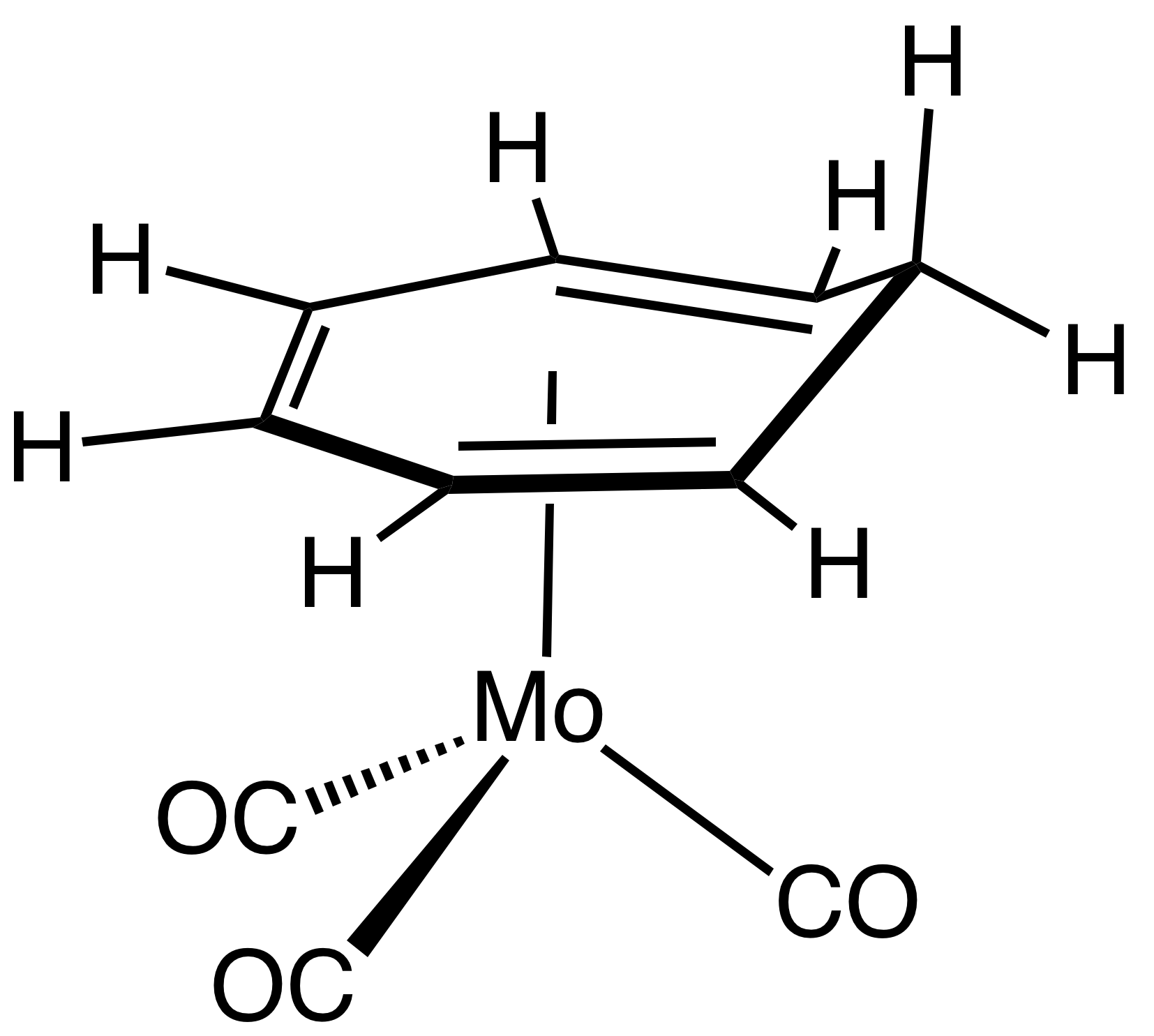
Mo(C_{7}H_{8})(CO)_{3}, a complex of cycloheptatriene.

Fe(C_{8}H_{8})_{2}, a complex of cyclooctatetraene

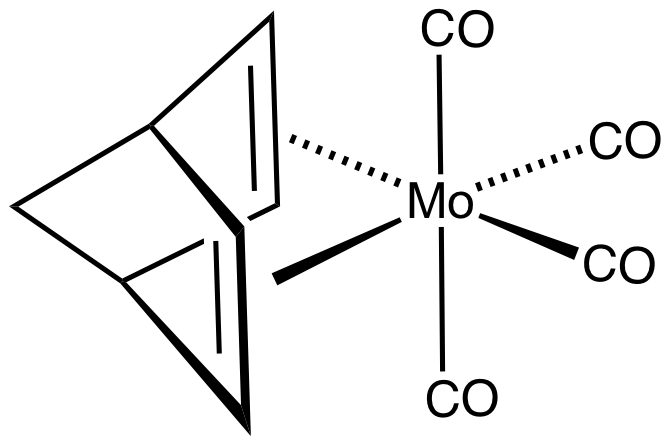
(Norbornadiene)molybdenum tetracarbonyl, a source of "Mo(CO)_{4}"

(Xylylene)Fe(CO)_{3}, illustrating the stabilization of a labile alkene by complexation

== Bonding ==
Structure of (acac)Rh(C_{2}H_{4})(C_{2}F_{4}), distances (red) in picometers.

The bonding between alkenes and transition metals is described by the Dewar–Chatt–Duncanson model, which involves donation of electrons in the pi-orbital on the alkene to empty orbitals on the metal. This interaction is reinforced by back bonding that entails sharing of electrons in other metal orbitals into the empty pi-antibonding level on the alkene. Early metals of low oxidation state (Ti(II), Zr(II), Nb(III) etc.) are strong pi donors, and their alkene complexes are often described as metallacyclopropanes. Treatment of such species with acids gives the alkanes. Late metals (Ir(I), Pt(II)), which are poorer pi-donors, tend to engage the alkene as a Lewis acid–Lewis base interaction. Similarly, C_{2}F_{4} is a stronger pi-acceptor than C_{2}H_{4}, as reflected in metal-carbon bond distances.

Bonding images

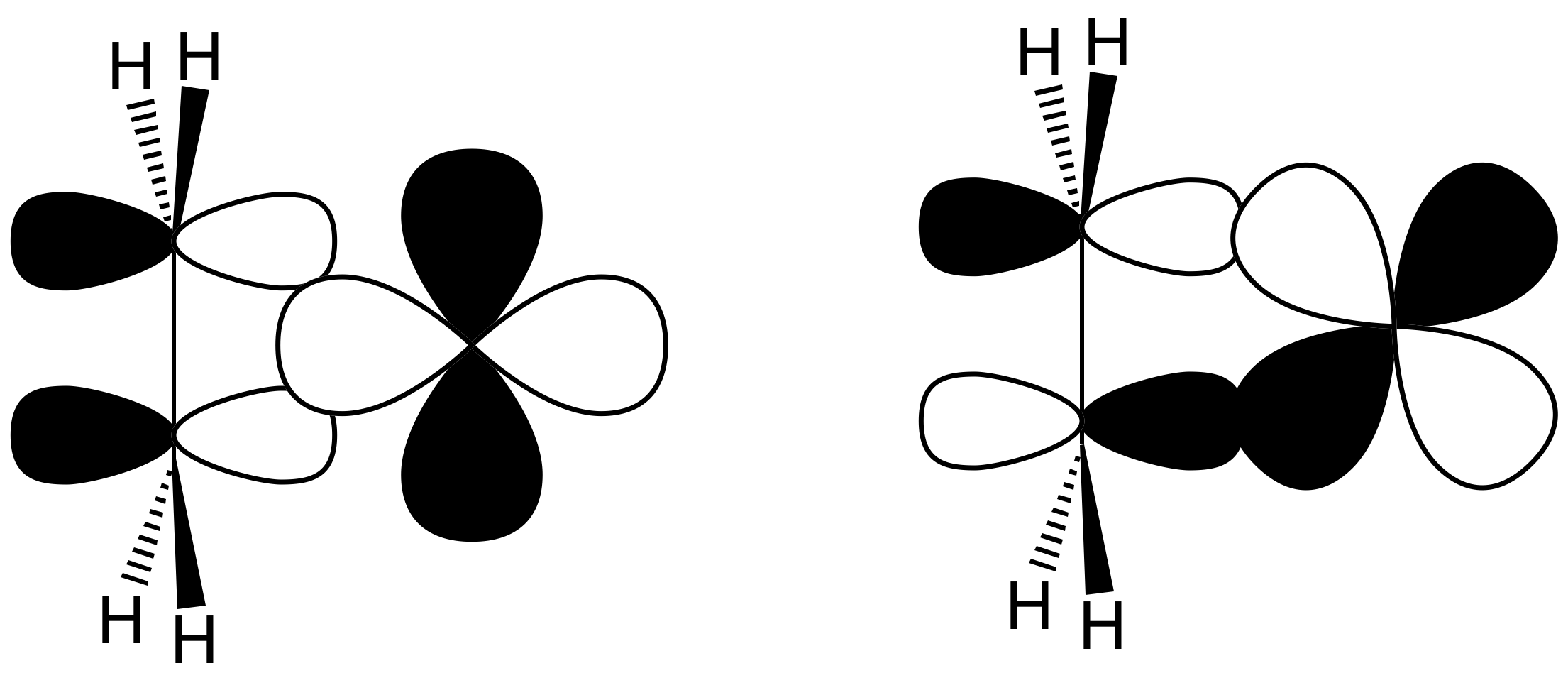
Orbital interactions in a metal-ethylene complex, as described by the Dewar–Chatt–Duncanson model

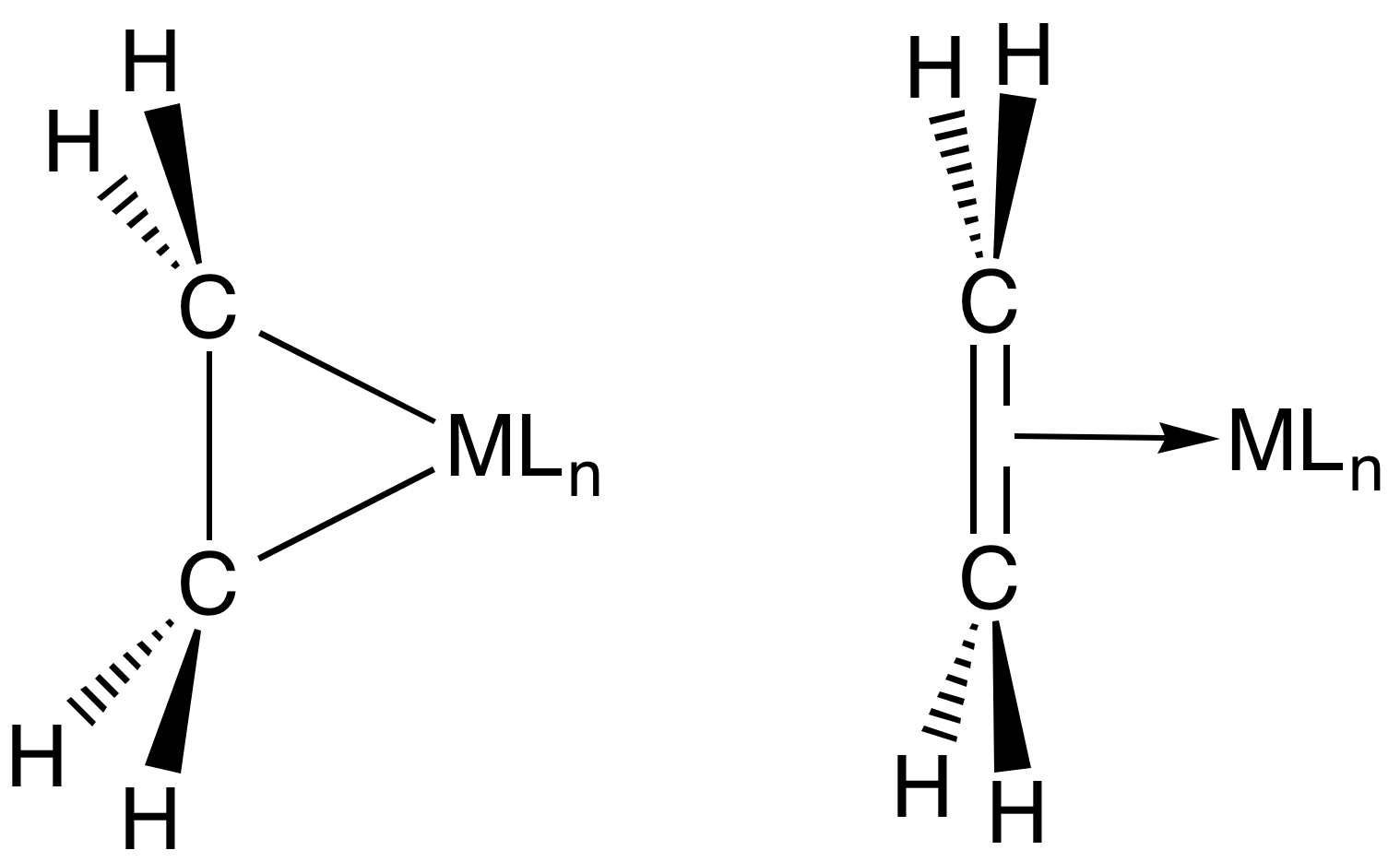
Two extreme depictions of M---C_{2}H_{4} interactions.

=== Rotational barrier ===
The barrier for the rotation of the alkene about the M-centroid vector is a measure of the strength of the M-alkene pi-bond. Low symmetry complexes are suitable for analysis of these rotational barriers associated with the metal-ethylene bond.In CpRh(C_{2}H_{4})(C_{2}F_{4}), the ethylene ligand is observed to rotate with a barrier near 12 kcal/mol but no rotation is observed for about the Rh-C_{2}F_{4} bond.

== Reactions and applications ==
Alkene ligands lose much of their unsaturated character upon complexation. Most famously, the alkene ligand undergoes migratory insertion, wherein it is attacked intramolecularly by alkyl and hydride ligands to form new alkyl complexes. Cationic alkene complexes are susceptible to attack by nucleophiles.

=== Catalysis ===
Metal alkene complexes are intermediates in many or most transition metal catalyzed reactions of alkenes: polymerization., hydrogenation, hydroformylation, and many other reactions.

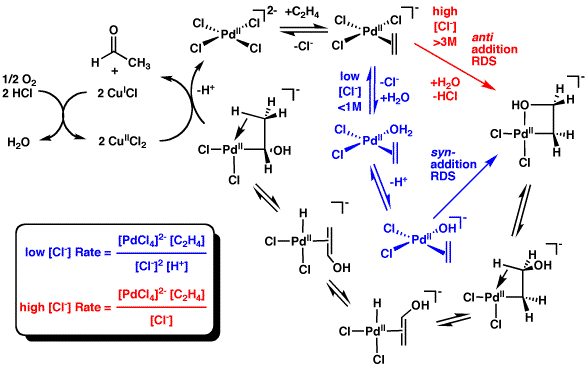
The mechanism of the Wacker process involves Pd-alkene complex intermediates.

=== Separations ===
Since alkenes are mainly produced as mixtures with alkanes, the separation of alkanes and alkenes is of commercial interest. Separation technologies often rely on facilitated transport membranes containing Ag^{+} or Cu^{+} salts that reversibly bind alkenes.

In argentation chromatography, stationary phases that contain silver salts are used to analyze organic compounds on the basis of the number and type of alkene (olefin) groups. This methodology is commonly employed for the analysis of the unsaturated content in fats and fatty acids.

== Natural occurrence ==
Metal-alkene complexes are uncommon in nature, with one exception. Ethylene affects the ripening of fruit and flowers by complexation to a Cu(I) center in a transcription factor.
