= Lidia Vallarino =

Italian inorganic chemist and academic (1930–2017)

Lidia Vallarino (1930–2017) was an inorganic chemist who was chemistry lecturer at the University of Milan. In the 1950s and 19960s, she was a rare example of a well-published female active in coordination chemistry and organometallic chemistry.

Vallarino received her PhD in 1954 from the University of Milan under the supervision of L. Malatesta for work on isocyanide complexes. She later took a position at ICI Laboratories under Joseph Chatt, where she worked on diene complexes of the platinum group metals. As an independent scientist, she worked on both organorhodium chemistry and macrocyclic complexes of the lanthanides. She retired as professor of chemistry at Virginia Commonwealth University.
