= Luigi M. Venanzi =

Luigi Maria Venanzi was an inorganic chemist who was recognized for diverse contributions to coordination chemistry. He was born in Italy in 1927.

After receiving his diplom degree at the University of Kiel, he took a position at ICI Laboratories, where he published extensively with Joseph Chatt. He then proceeded to receive his D.Phil. at Oxford, where he remained as lecturer until 1968. He left England to become professor at SUNY Albany and later the University of Delaware. He then moved to ETH, succeeding Gerold Schwarzenbach. He finished his career in Switzerland, working extensively on platinum phosphine complexes and 31P NMR spectroscopy.

A lecture award was created in his memory in 2014.

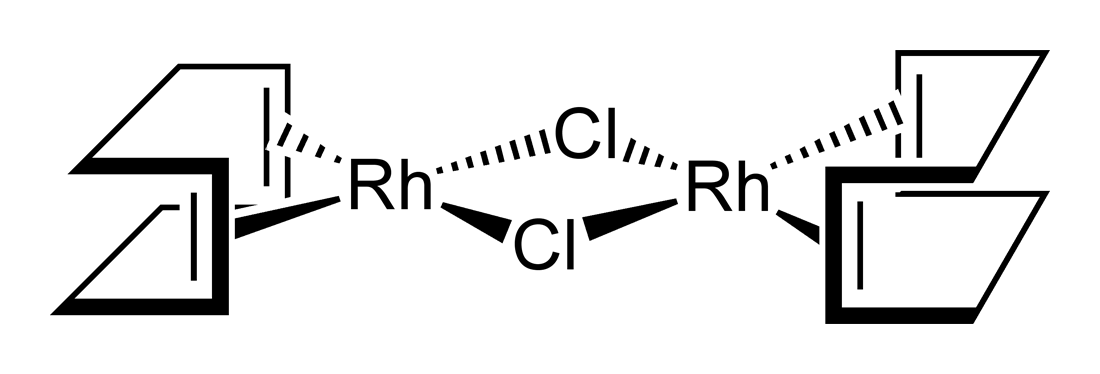
Rh_{2}Cl_{2}(cyclooctadiene)_{2}, a popular reagent and precatalyst first reported by Chatt and Venanzi.
