= Joseph Chatt =

Joseph Chatt CBE FRS
- Born: 6 November 1914; Horden, County Durham, England
- Died: 19 May 1994 (aged 79); Hove, East Sussex, England
- Education: Emmanuel College, Cambridge
- Spouse: Ethel Williams (m. 1947)
- Children: 2

Joseph Chatt CBE FRS (6 November 1914 – 19 May 1994) was a renowned British researcher in the area of inorganic and organometallic chemistry. His name is associated with the description of the pi-bond between transition metals and alkenes, the Dewar–Chatt–Duncanson model.

== Early life and education ==
Chatt was born to a farming family in Horden, County Durham. At age 10, he moved with his family to Welton, Cumbria south of Carlisle. Chatt attended the Nelson School.

In 1937, Chatt graduated with his first degree in Chemistry at from Emmanuel College, Cambridge. He went on to complete his PhD at Cambridge under the direction of F. G. Mann for research on organoarsenic and organophosphorus compounds and their complexes with transition metals.

== Career and contributions ==
Structure of PtHCl(PEt_{3})_{2} described by Chatt et al.

Chatt was employed at Imperial Chemical Industries from 1949 to 1962, during which time he published influential work on the metal hydrides and metal alkene complexes. During this period, he reported the first example of C-H bond activation by a transition metal and the first non-organometallic transition metal hydride. While at ICI, he work with several future luminaries, including Luigi M. Venanzi, Lidia Vallarino, and especially Bernard L. Shaw.

In the 1960s, Chatt moved to a professorship at the University of Sussex and subsequently assumed directorship of the Nitrogen Fixation Unit under the Agricultural Research Council. Using the transition metal dinitrogen complex W(N_{2})_{2}(dppe)_{2}, his group first demonstrated the conversion of a dinitrogen ligand into ammonia. This work provided some of the first molecular models for nitrogen fixation. Chatt authored or co-authored over 300 peer-reviewed publications.

Among his many awards, he was recognised with the 1981 Wolf Prize "for pioneering and fundamental contributions to synthetic transition metal chemistry, particularly transition metal hydrides and dinitrogen complexes." He was elected a Fellow of the Royal Society in 1961 and was made a Commander of the Order of the British Empire.

== Personal life ==
In 1947, Chatt married Ethel Williams, with whom he had a daughter and a son. They lived in Ditchling, Sussex.

== Death and legacy ==
Chatt fell ill in 1991 and died suddenly in 1994. At the time, he was "preparing himself for a joint photograph" with other Fellows at Sussex University.

In 1995, a year after his death, the Unit of Nitrogen Fixation moved to Norwich and became part of the John Innes Centre. The new building, as well as an annual lecture at the Centre, were named in his honour.
