= Norbornadiene =

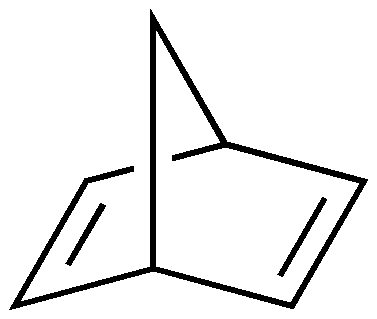

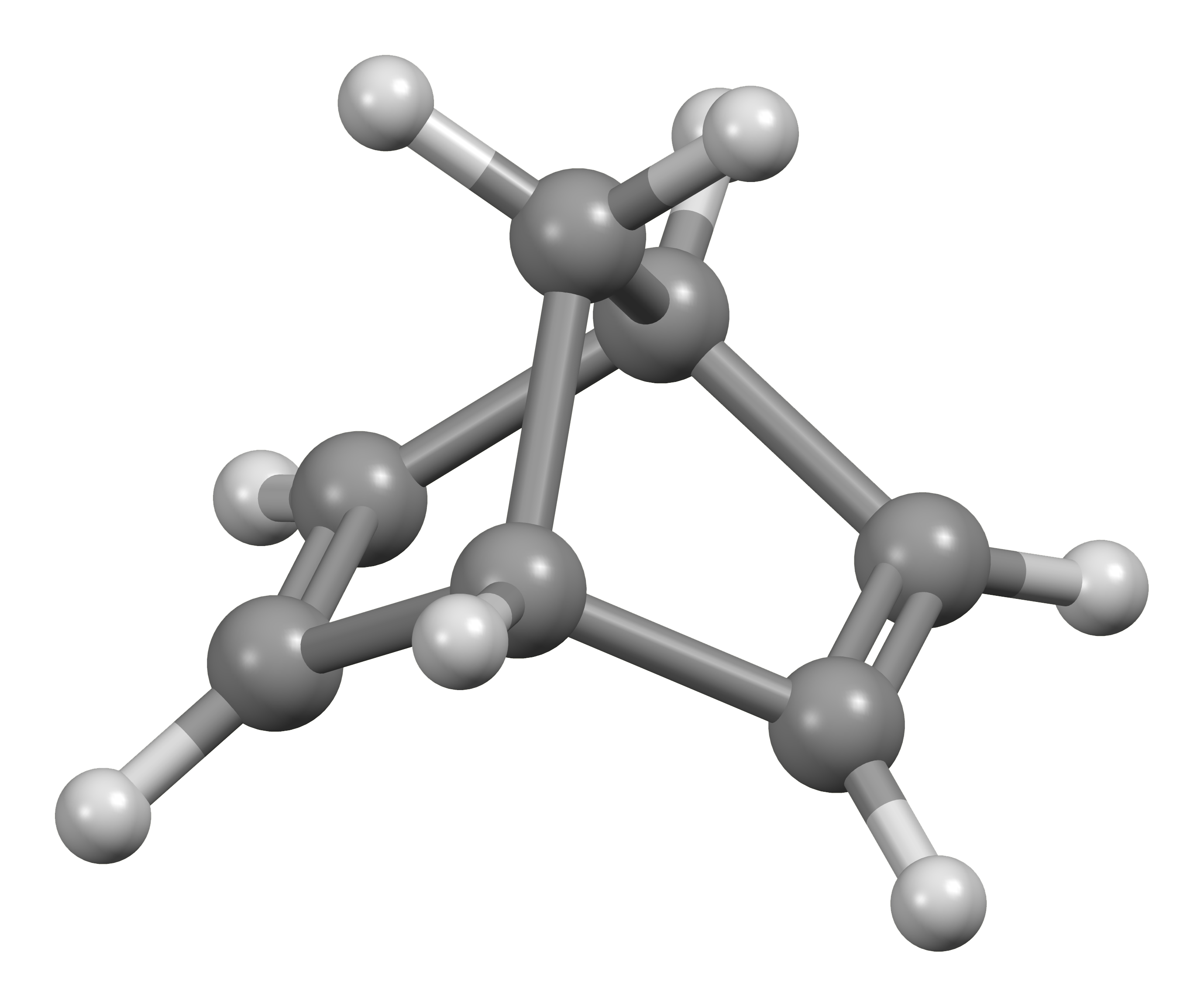

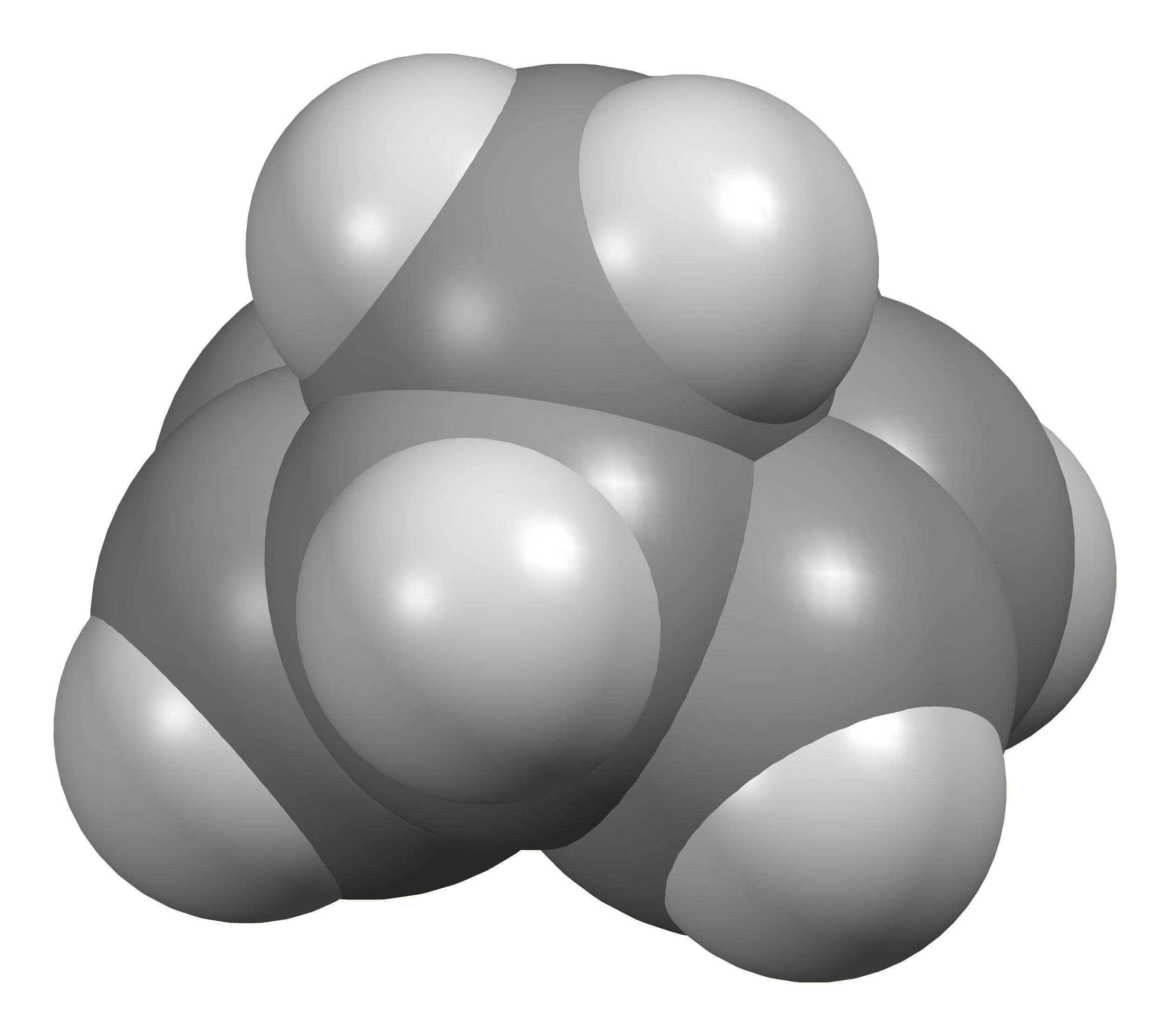

Names
- Preferred IUPAC name Bicyclo[2.2.1]hepta-2,5-diene
- Other names 2,5-Norbornadiene

Identifiers
CAS Number	121-46-0
3D model (JSmol)	Interactive image
ChemSpider	8160
ECHA InfoCard	100.004.066
EC Number	204-472-0
PubChem CID	8473
UNII	W9ZTQ75ZUS
UN number	2251
CompTox Dashboard (EPA)	DTXSID1059523
- InChI: InChI=1S/C7H8/c1-2-7-4-3-6(1)5-7/h1-4,6-7H,5H2 Key: SJYNFBVQFBRSIB-UHFFFAOYSA-N
- SMILES: C1C2C=CC1C=C2

Properties
Chemical formula	C_{7}H_{8}
Molar mass	92.14 g/mol
Density	0.906 g/cm^{3}
Melting point	−19 °C (−2 °F; 254 K)
Boiling point	89 °C (192 °F; 362 K)
Solubility in water	Insoluble

Hazards
- GHS labelling
Pictograms	(GHS02: Flammable)
Signal word	Danger
Hazard statements	H225
Precautionary statements	P210, P233, P240, P241, P242, P243, P280, P303+P361+P353, P370+P378, P403+P235, P501
- Except where otherwise noted, data are given for materials in their standard state (at 25 °C [77 °F], 100 kPa). verify (what is ?) Infobox references

Norbornadiene is an organic compound and a bicyclic hydrocarbon. Norbornadiene is of interest as a metal-binding ligand, whose complexes are useful for homogeneous catalysis. It has been intensively studied owing to its high reactivity and distinctive structural property of being a diene that cannot isomerize (isomers would be anti-Bredt alkenes). Norbornadiene is also a useful dienophile in Diels-Alder reactions.

== Synthesis ==
Norbornadiene can be formed by a Diels-Alder reaction between cyclopentadiene and acetylene

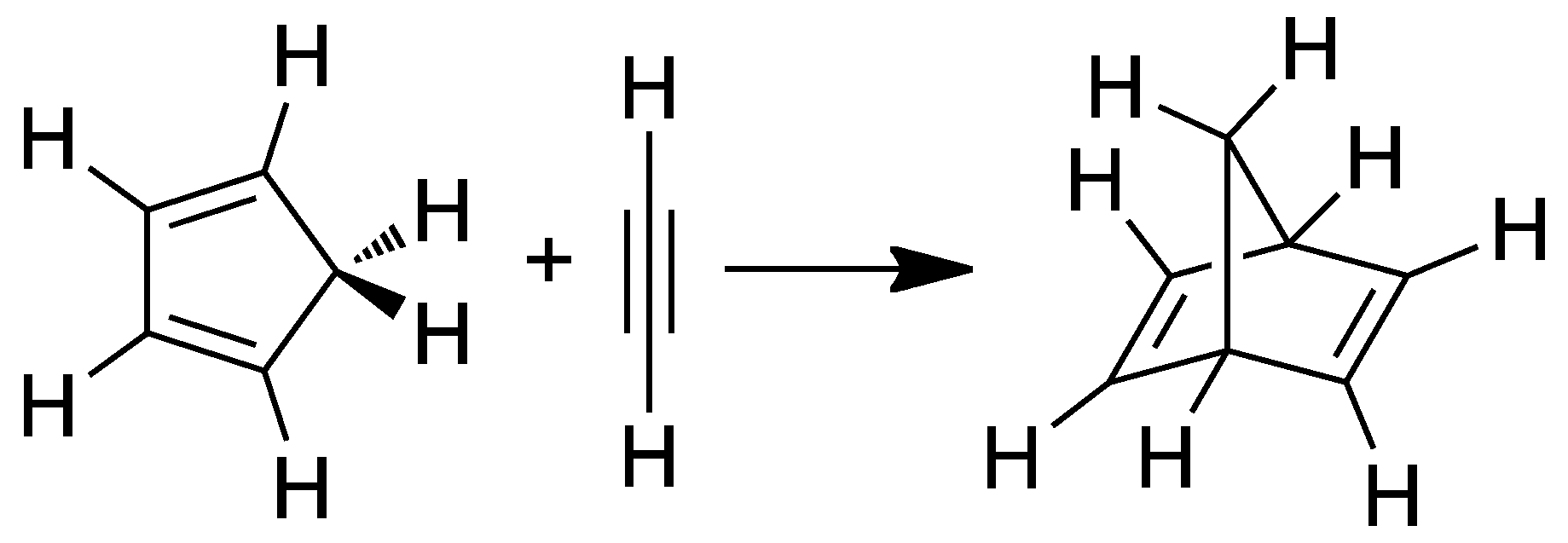
Norbornadiene synthesis

== Reactions ==
Quadricyclane, a valence isomer, can be obtained from norbornadiene by a photochemical reaction when assisted by a sensitizer such as acetophenone:

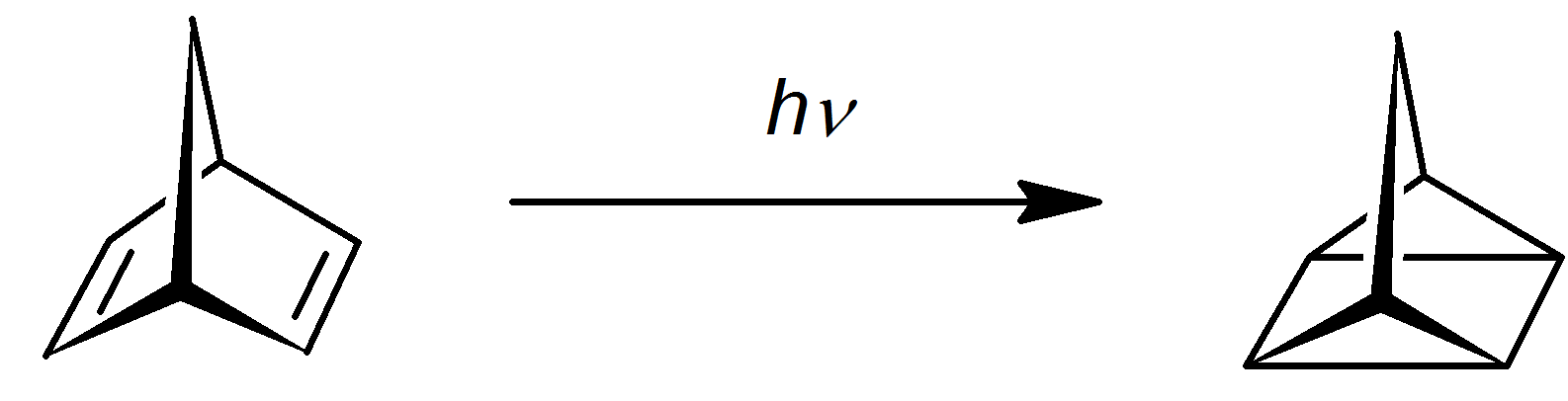

The norbornadiene-quadricyclane couple is of potential interest for solar energy storage when controlled release of the strain energy stored in quadricyclane back to norbornadiene is made possible.

Norbornadiene is reactive in cycloaddition reactions. Norbornadiene is also the starting material for the synthesis of diamantane and sumanene and it is used as an acetylene transfer agent for instance in reaction with 3,6-di-2-pyridyl-1,2,4,5-tetrazine.

=== As a ligand ===
Norbornadiene is a versatile ligand in organometallic chemistry, where it serves as a two-electron or four-electron donor. (Norbornadiene)molybdenum tetracarbonyl is used as a source of "Mo(CO)_{4}", exploiting the lability of the diene ligand in this case. The analogous chromium compound is also a useful source of "chromium tetracarbonyl," e.g. in reactions with phosphine ligands.

The norbornadiene analogue of cyclooctadiene rhodium chloride dimer has been used in homogeneous catalysis. Chiral, C_{2}-symmetric dienes derived from norbornadiene have also been described.

== See also ==
- Norbornane a saturated compound with the same carbon skeleton.
- Norbornene a compound with the same carbon skeleton, but with one less double bond.
