= Diamantane =

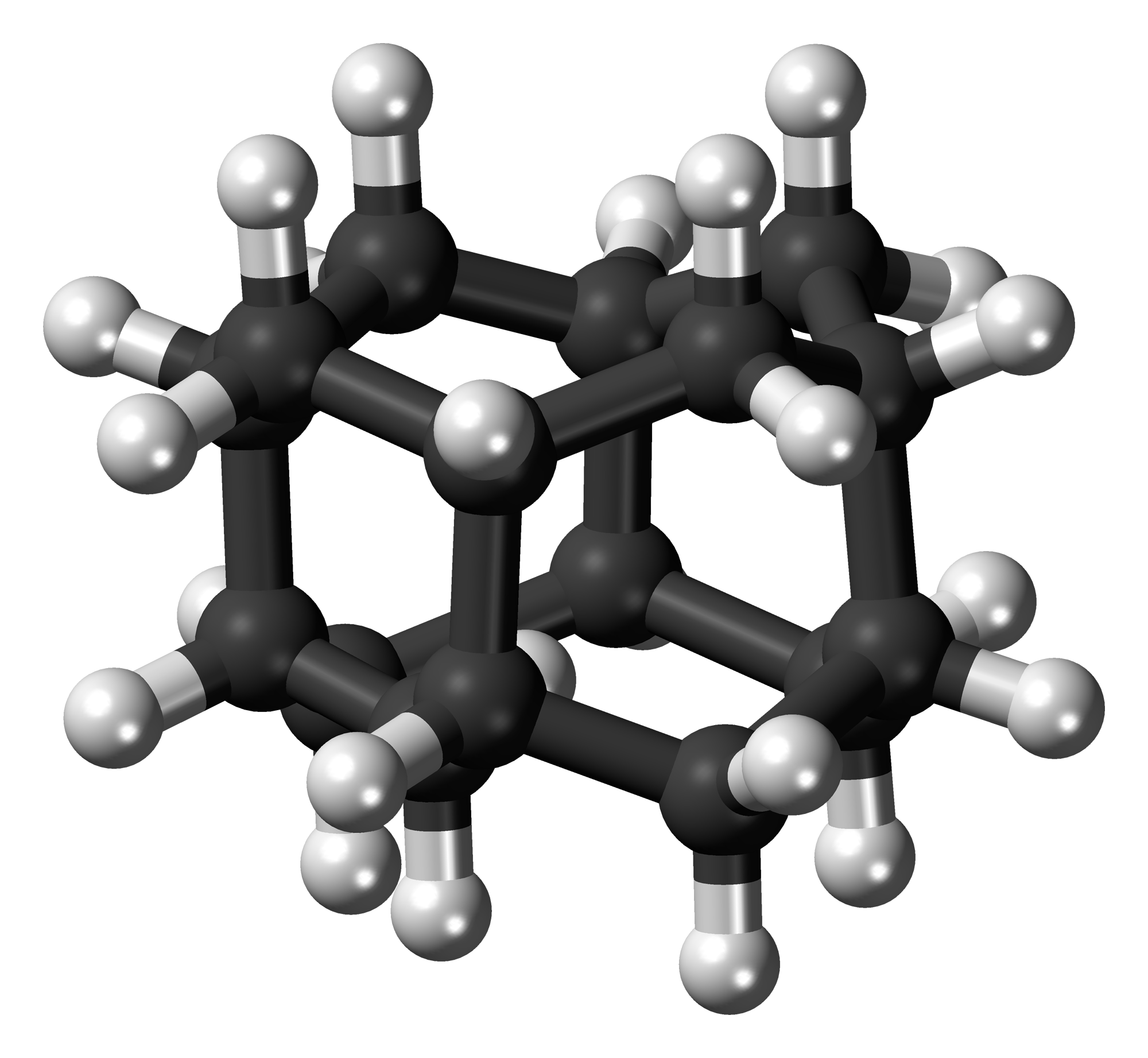

Names
- IUPAC name Pentacyclo[7.3.1.1^{4,12}.0^{2,7}.0^{6,11}]tetradecane
- Other names: Congressane; Diadamantane; Decahydro-3,5,1,7-[1,2,3,4]butanetetraylnaphthalene

Identifiers
CAS Number	2292-79-7
3D model (JSmol)	Interactive image
Beilstein Reference	1904934
ChEBI	CHEBI:38223
ChemSpider	109769
PubChem CID	123154
UNII	KYM5H16I3I
CompTox Dashboard (EPA)	DTXSID60177464
- InChI: Key: ZICQBHNGXDOVJF-UHFFFAOYSA-N; InChI=1S/C14H20/c1-7-2-12-10-4-8-5-11(9(1)10)13(3-7)14(12)6-8/h7-14H,1-6H2
- SMILES: C1C5CC2C3C(C4C1C2CC(C3)C4)C5

Properties
Chemical formula	C_{14}H_{20}
Molar mass	188.314 g·mol^{−1}
Appearance	solid white crystal
Density	1.092 ± 0.06 g cm^{−3}
Melting point	244.73 °C (472.51 °F; 517.88 K)
Boiling point	269.5 ± 7.0 °C
Solubility in water	sparingly soluble (8.1 × 10^{−4} g L^{−1})
Solubility in diethyl ether	soluble
log P	5.556 ± 0.228
Vapor pressure	0.0120 Torr

Structure
Point group	D_{3d}
Dipole moment	0 D

Thermochemistry
Std enthalpy of formation (Δ_{f}H^{⦵}_{298})	-145.9 kJ/mol (gas) -241.9 kJ/mol (solid)

Hazards
- Occupational safety and health (OHS/OSH)
Main hazards	irritant, acute toxicity to aquatic life
- GHS labelling
Pictograms	(GHS07: Exclamation mark)
Signal word	Warning
Hazard statements	H315, H319, H335
Precautionary statements	P261, P264, P264+P265, P271, P280, P302+P352, P304+P340, P305+P351+P338, P319, P321, P332+P317, P337+P317, P362+P364, P403+P233, P405, P501
NFPA 704 (fire diamond)	0 0 0
Flash point	98.1 °C (208.6 °F; 371.2 K)
Safety data sheet (SDS)	External MSDS
- Except where otherwise noted, data are given for materials in their standard state (at 25 °C [77 °F], 100 kPa). Infobox references

Diamantane, colored by symmetry, carbon black, blue, purple, and hydrogen as white, yellow, and cyan

Diamantane (also called congressane) is an organic compound that is a member of the diamondoids. These are cage hydrocarbons with structures similar to a subunit of the diamond lattice. It is a colorless solid that has been a topic of research since its discovery in oil and separation from deep natural gas condensates. Diamondoids such as diamantane exhibit unusual properties, including low surface energies, high densities, high hydrophobicities, and resistance to oxidation.

== Properties ==
Part of the diamond crystal lattice with structures of adamantane (light-grey, left), diamantane (red) and triamantane (dark-grey, right)

Diamantane is part of the diamondoid-family. The structures of these members are segments of the diamond crystal lattice. Because of its special structure, diamantane's melting point is high compared to other hydrocarbons. Another result is its high chemical and thermal stability.

== Occurrence and history ==
Diamantane occurs naturally in crude petroleum. It is currently assumed that adamantanes and diamantanes were formed via the catalytic rearrangements of polycyclic naphthenic hydrocarbons. Although present in only trace concentrations in typical oils, due to their great thermodynamic stability, diamondoids such as diamantane are naturally concentrated by catagenesis, becoming important constituents of some natural gas condensates including those from the Norphlet Formation, U.S. Gulf of Mexico, and the Western Canada Basin.

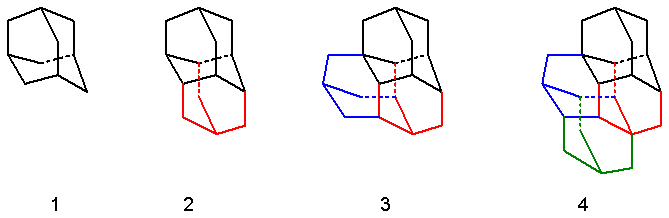
Diamantane is the second member of this series of diamondoid hydrocarbons.

Diamantane was chosen as the Congress Emblem of the 1963 London IUPAC meeting, and was featured as a decoration on the cover of abstracts, program, and publicity material. Congress participants were challenged to synthesize diamantane. The first preparation of this chemical was achieved in 1965 in 1% yield by aluminum halide-catalyzed isomerization of a mixture of norbornene photodimers. Adamantane was the first, and "Congressane", as diamantane came to be known, was only the second member of an entire family of compounds known as the diamondoids. The synthesis of the third member of the series in 1969 emphasized the need for a more general scheme of semitrivial nomenclature. The compound was renamed "diamantane" and the third member designated "triamantane".

The year 1966 also marked the isolation of diamantane from the high-boiling fractions of the crude oil of Hodonín (from which adamantane was discovered) and the achievement of a significant improvement in its yield (to 10%). While this permitted a start to be made in the exploration of the chemistry of diamantane, the hydrocarbon was still difficult to obtain in quantity. Diamantane then became as readily available as adamantane and its chemistry could be studied more easily.

== Production ==
Diamantane can be prepared by Lewis acid catalyzed rearrangements of various pentacyclic tetradecanes. The best yield (84%) can obtained from trans-tetrahydro-Binor-S. A convenient synthetic procedure, detailed below, involves rearrangement of a hydrogenated Binor-S compound, which gives diamantane in ~70% yield. Other more highly strained precursors give diamantane in lower yield (1-47%) owing to disproportionation.

Laboratory synthesis begins with the dimerization of norbornadiene (1) catalyzed by a mixture of cobalt bromide-triphenylphosphine and boron trifluoride etherate. The resulting dimer (2) is hydrogenated to give tetrahydro-binor-S isomers (3a–3d). As a result of sterical interaction, mainly 3a and 3b are given. The next step is a rearrangement, which occurs in a hot solution of cyclohexane or carbon disulfide with aluminum bromide and forms the main product diamantane (4).

Synthesis of diamantane

Diamantane can be produced by thermal cracking of long chained n-alkanes. The mechanism for this conversion is thought to be a free-radical addition. Although this method does produce diamantane that has been alkylated (i.e. monosubstituted, disubstituted, and trisubstituted with methyl groups), adamantane derivatives are also produced in greater amounts due to its greater thermodynamic stability. This method also produces a homological series of n-alkanes of up to 35 carbons and coke, as well. The assumption that diamondoid compounds can be synthesized through thermal cracking requires more verification.

== Reactions ==
Diamantane can be nitrated by treatment with nitronium tetrafluoroborate (in nitrile-free nitromethane) to give a mixture of two isomeric nitrodiamantanes.

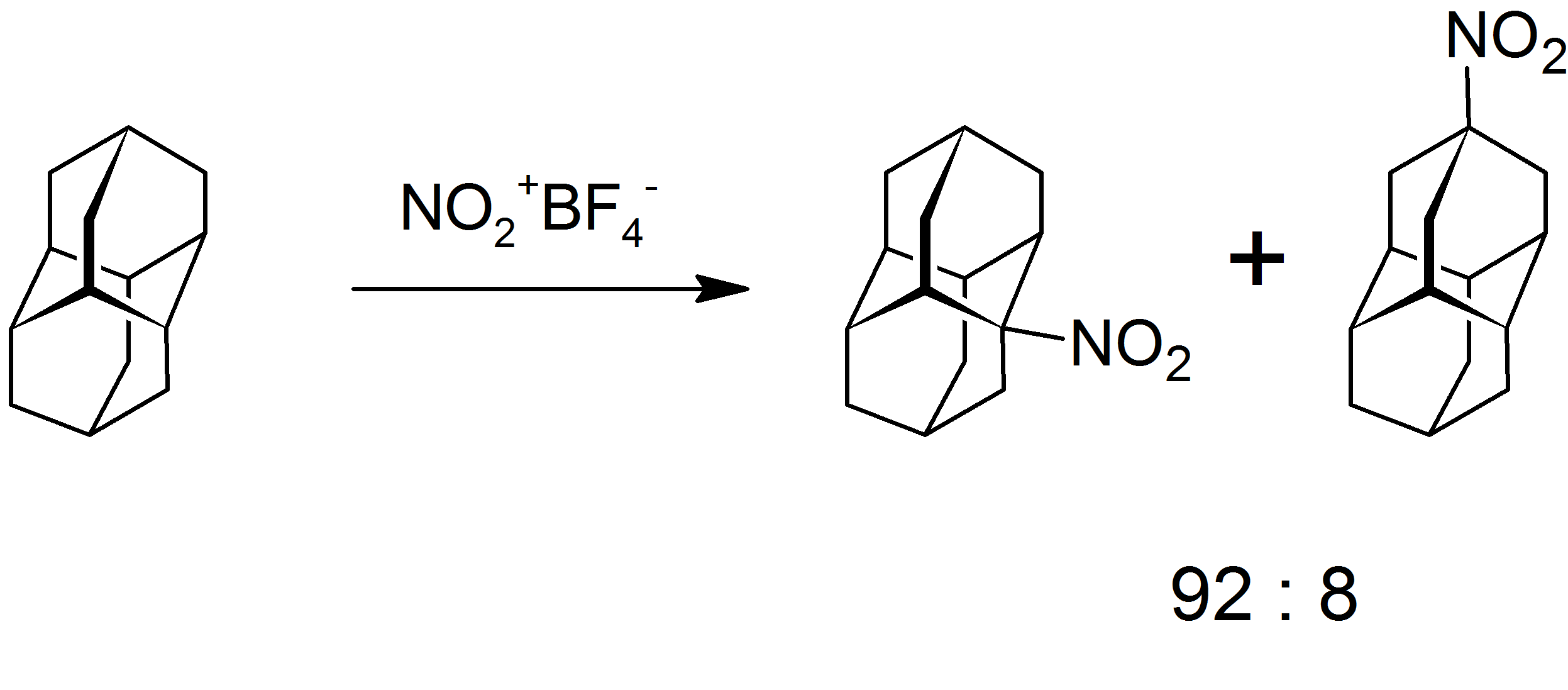

Chlorination with aluminium chloride and acetyl chloride yields equal amounts of 1- and 4-chlorodiamantane, whereas use of chlorosulfonic acid yields mainly the 1-chloro isomer. Hydrolysis of the chlorides yield the corresponding alcohols, which are separable by column chromatography over alumina.
