= Dewar–Chatt–Duncanson model =

Model in organometallic chemistry

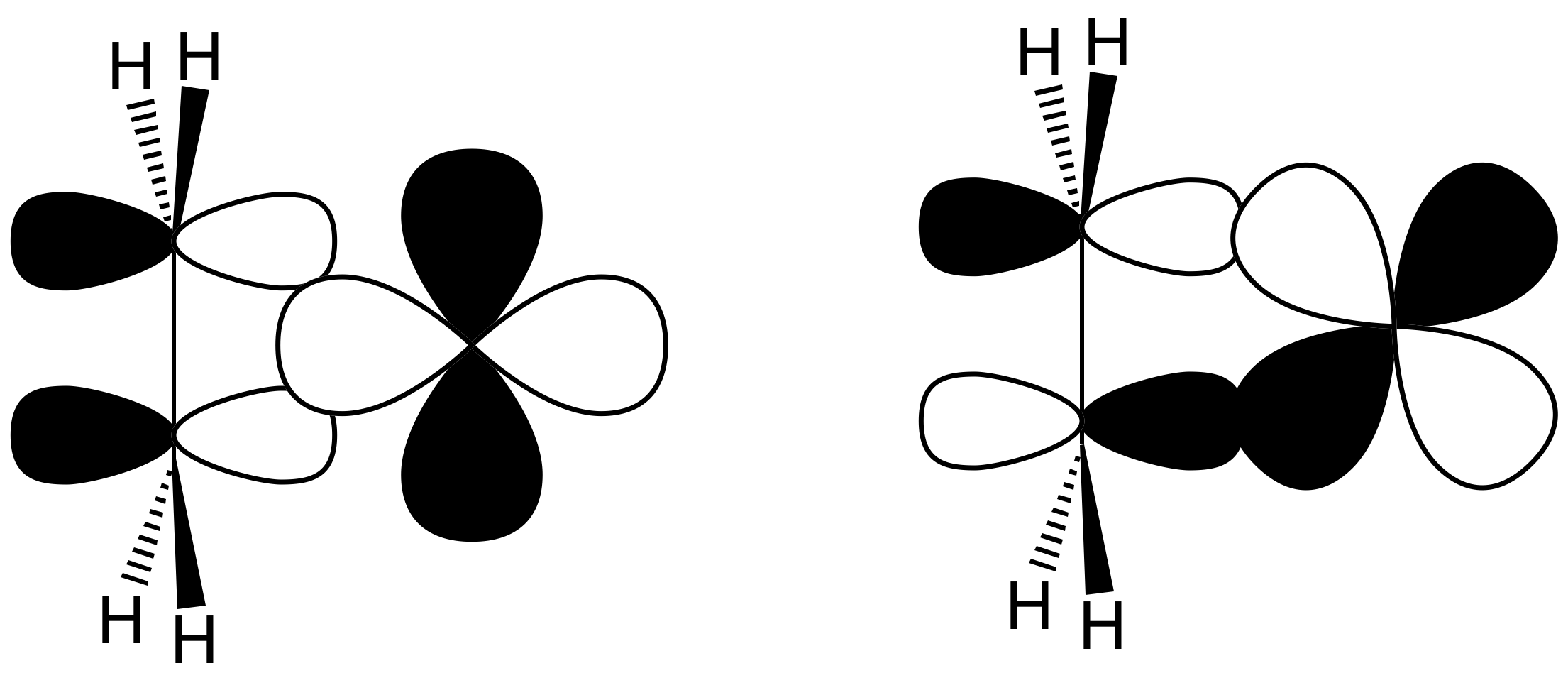
Orbital interactions in a metal-ethylene complex. On the left, a filled pi-orbital on C_{2}H_{4} overlaps with an empty d-orbital on the metal. On the right, an empty pi-antibonding orbital on C_{2}H_{4} overlaps with a filled d-orbital on the metal

The Dewar–Chatt–Duncanson model is a model in organometallic chemistry that explains the chemical bonding in transition metal alkene complexes. The model is named after Michael J. S. Dewar, Joseph Chatt and L. A. Duncanson. The Dewar–Chatt–Duncanson model describes the binding of a transition metal to the C=C bond.

The alkene donates electron density into a π-acid metal d-orbital from a C−C π bonding orbital between the carbon atoms, allowing the alkene to behave as a σ-donor to the metal. The metal donates electrons back from a (different) filled d-orbital into the empty π^{*} antibonding orbital, allowing the alkene to function as a π-acceptor. Both of these effects tend to reduce the carbon-carbon bond order, leading to an elongated C−C distance and a lowering of its vibrational frequency. Overall, forward donation from the alkene is more prominent for electronegative, late transition metals (e.g., Cu, Au, Pt, Hg), resulting in complexes electrophilic at the carbon, while backdonation from the metal is more prominent for electropositive, early transition metals, provided the metal is not d^{0} (i.e., the metal lacks d electrons to donate). For complexes of very early transition metals like (^{i}PrO)_{2}Ti(η^{2}-C_{2}H_{4})), for example, the backbonding can be so important that the molecule is better described as a metallacyclopropane with metal in the n+2 oxidation state (in this example, Ti(IV)), rather than an alkene π-complex of the metal in oxidation state n (in this example, Ti(II)). These complexes are therefore nucleophilic at the carbon, possessing significant carbanionic character. Progressing across the d-block from left to right, d orbital energies steadily decrease. As a consequence, although the late transition metals often have many d electrons, these electrons tend to reside in orbitals that are too low-lying to allow for efficient backbonding to the π* orbital. In particular, backbonding has been found computationally to contribute less than 20% of the bond energy for d^{10} group 10 and 11 alkene complexes, and is energetically negligible (<5% contribution) for alkene complexes of the group 12 metals.

Oxidation state plays a role as well. In Zeise's salt K[PtCl_{3}(C_{2}H_{4})]^{.}H_{2}O (a d^{8} group 10 complex) the C−C bond length has increased to 134 picometres from 133 pm for ethylene. According to the DCD models, this small change in the C−C bond indicates that there is little back-donation from the Pt(II) center. In general, higher oxidation states further stabilize d orbitals, making them less available for backbonding. In the nickel(0) compound Ni(C_{2}H_{4})(PPh_{3})_{2} (a d^{10} group 10 complex) the C−C bond length is 143 pm. Ni(0) is expected to be a more powerful π-donor, resulting in greater donation into the π* antibonding level of the alkene.

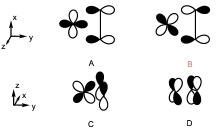
The orbital interactions of alkyne-metal complexes, with A & B being interactions between the parallel π orbitals with the d orbital, and C & D being the interactions between the perpendicular π orbital and the d orbitals. Note that B & D are backbonding interactions.

The interaction also causes carbon atoms to "rehybridise" from sp^{2} towards sp^{3}, which is indicated by the bending of the hydrogen atoms on the ethylene back away from the metal.

Like alkenes, alkynes adopt a similar bonding interaction, as shown in the image on the right. Not all alkyne-metal complexes utilize all four of these interactions for bonding (due to reasons like unviable d orbitals).

== Main group complexes ==
Main group elements can also form π-complexes with alkenes and alkynes. The β-diketiminato aluminum(I) complex Al{HC(CMeNAr)_{2}} (Ar = 2,6-diisopropylphenyl), which bears an Al-based sp^{x} lone pair, reacts with alkenes and alkynes to give alumina^{(III)}cyclopropanes and alumina^{(III)}cyclopropenes in a process analogous to the formation of π-complexes by transition metals with strong backbonding. However, in most cases, the backbonding interaction is absent in these complexes due to the lack of energetically accessible filled orbitals for backdonation, resulting in π-complexes that dissociate readily and are therefore more challenging to observe or isolate.
