= Diamondoid =

Various forms of carbon crystal lattices

In chemistry, diamondoids are generalizations of the carbon cage molecule known as adamantane (C_{10}H_{16}), the smallest unit cage structure of the diamond crystal lattice. Diamondoids also known as nanodiamonds or condensed adamantanes may include one or more cages (adamantane, diamantane, triamantane, and higher polymantanes) as well as numerous isomeric and structural variants of adamantanes and polymantanes. These diamondoids occur naturally in petroleum deposits and have been extracted and purified into large pure crystals of polymantane molecules having more than a dozen adamantane cages per molecule. These species are of interest as molecular approximations of the diamond cubic framework, terminated with C−H bonds.

== Examples ==
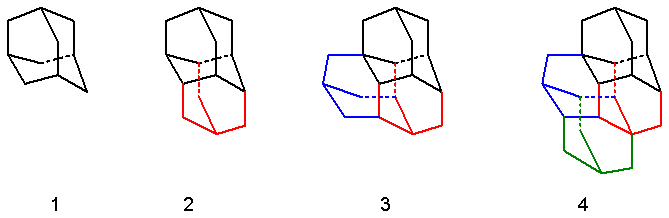
Diamondoids, from left to right adamantane, diamantane, triamantane and one isomer of tetramantane

Examples include:

- Adamantane (C_{10}H_{16})
- Iceane (C_{12}H_{18})
- BC-8 (C_{14}H_{20})
- Diamantane (C_{14}H_{20}) also diadamantane, two face-fused cages
- Triamantane (C_{18}H_{24}), also triadamantane. Diamantane has four identical faces available for anchoring a new C_{4}H_{4} unit.
- Isotetramantane (C_{22}H_{28}). Triamantane has eight faces on to which a new C_{4}H_{4} unit can be added resulting in four isomers. One of these isomers displays a helical twist and is therefore prochiral. The P and M enantiomers have been separated.
- Pentamantane has nine isomers with chemical formula C_{26}H_{32} and one more pentamantane exists with chemical formula C_{25}H_{30}
- Cyclohexamantane (C_{26}H_{30})
- Super-adamantane (C_{30}H_{36})

One tetramantane isomer is the largest ever diamondoid prepared by organic synthesis using a keto-carbenoid reaction to attach cyclopentane rings. Longer diamondoids have been formed from diamantane dicarboxylic acid. The first-ever isolation of a wide range of diamondoids from petroleum took place in the following steps: a vacuum distillation above 345 °C, the equivalent atmospheric boiling point, then pyrolysis at 400 to 450 °C in order to remove all non-diamondoid compounds (diamondoids are thermodynamically very stable and will survive this pyrolysis) and then a series of high-performance liquid chromatography separation techniques.

In one study a tetramantane compound is fitted with thiol groups at the bridgehead positions. This allows their anchorage to a gold surface and formation of self-assembled monolayers (diamond-on-gold).

Organic chemistry of diamondoids even extends to pentamantane. The medial position (base) in this molecule (the isomer [1(2,3)4]pentamantane) is calculated to yield a more favorable carbocation than the apical position (top) and simple bromination of pentamantane 1 with bromine exclusively gives the medial bromo derivative 2 which on hydrolysis in water and DMF forms the alcohol 3.

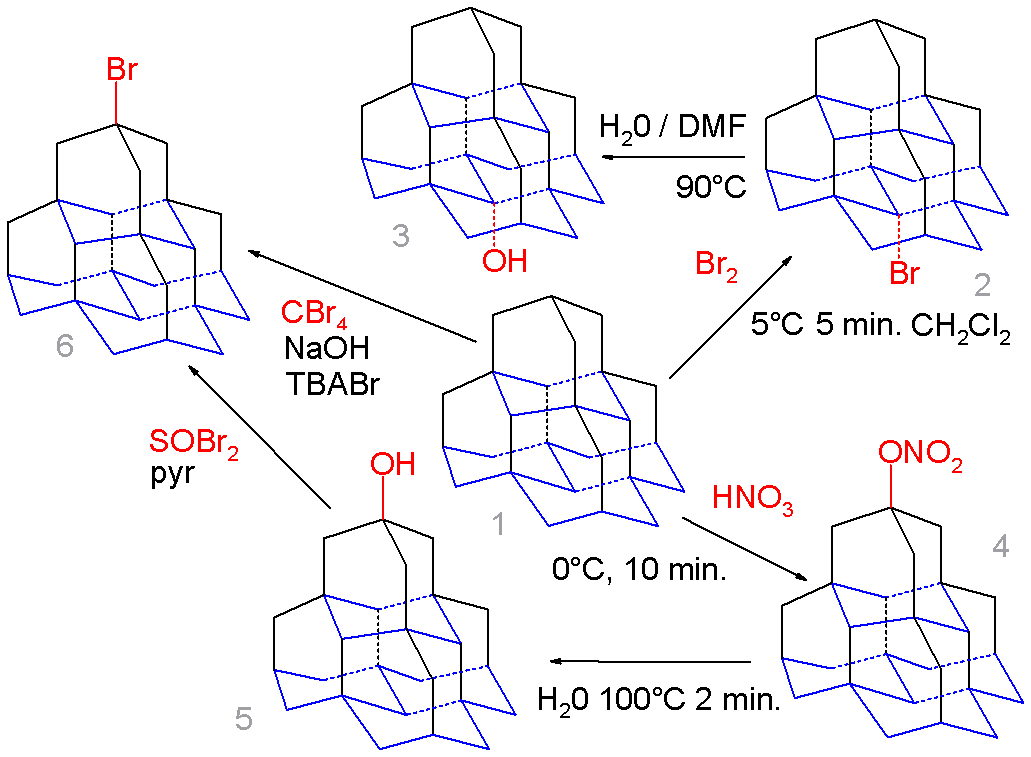
Pentamane chemistry

In contrast nitrooxylation of 1 with nitric acid gives the apical nitrate 4 as an intermediate which is hydrolysed to the apical alcohol 5 due to the higher steric demand of the active electrophilic NO^{−}_{2}HNO^{+}_{3} species. This alcohol can react with thionyl bromide to the bromide 6 and in a series of steps (not shown) to the corresponding thiol. Pentamantane can also react with tetrabromomethane and tetra-n-butylammonium bromide (TBABr) in a free radical reaction to the bromide but without selectivity.

== Origin and occurrence ==
Diamondoids are found in mature high-temperature petroleum fluids (volatile oils, condensates and wet gases). These fluids can have up to a spoonful of diamondoids per US gallon (3.78 liters). A review by Mello and Moldowan in 2005 showed that although the carbon in diamonds is not biological in origin, the diamondoids found in petroleum are composed of carbon from biological sources. This was determined by comparing the ratios of carbon isotopes present.

== Optical and electronic properties ==
The optical absorption for all diamondoids lies deep in the ultraviolet spectral region with optical band gaps around 6 electronvolts and higher. The spectrum of each diamondoid is found to reflect its individual size, shape and symmetry. Due to their well-defined size and structure diamondoids also serve as a model system for electronic structure calculations.

Many of the optoelectronic properties of diamondoids are determined by the difference in the nature of the highest occupied and lowest unoccupied molecular orbitals: the former is a bulk state, whereas the latter is a surface state. As a result, the energy of the lowest unoccupied molecular orbital is roughly independent of the size of the diamondoid.

Diamondoids have been found to exhibit a negative electron affinity, making them potentially useful in electron-emission devices and in polymers, coating materials, and drugs.

== See also ==
- Other diamond-like compounds: Boron nitride
- Abiogenic petroleum origin
- Nanorobot
- “Diamonoids” were claimed as an airburst proxy, but may have been a misspelling of diamondoid in a now-retracted paper.
