= Bernard L. Shaw =

British chemist (1930–2020)

Bernard Leslie Shaw, FRS (28 March 1930 – 8 November 2020) was an English chemist who made notable contributions to organometallic chemistry. He was Professor of Inorganic and Structural Chemistry at the University of Leeds.

== Early life ==
Shaw was born on 28 March 1930 in Springhead (then in the West Riding of Yorkshire). His parents were Tom and Vera Shaw. He was educated at Hulme Grammar School in Oldham.

Shaw married Mary Elizabeth Neild in 1951.

== Career ==
Shaw studied at the University of Manchester where he gained a BSc and a PhD. After three years in the Civil Service at the Torry Research Station in Aberdeen and five years at ICI he was appointed Lecturer in the Department of Inorganic and Structural Chemistry at the University of Leeds in 1962. He was promoted to Reader in 1966 and to a Personal Chair in 1971. He was made head of the university's department of Inorganic Chemistry in 1990 and Emeritus Professor upon his retirement in 1995.

Shaw was at various times a Visiting Professor at the University of Western Ontario, Carnegie Mellon University (1969), the American National University (1983) and the University of Auckland (1986). He was lecturer at the Royal Society of Chemistry in 1987–88.

== Scientific contributions ==
Preparation of a nickel pincer complex as described by Shaw et al.

Together with his longtime collaborator Joseph Chatt, Shaw contributed to the development of organoplatinum chemistry. They reported the first platinum hydride, PtHCl(PEt_{3})_{2}. This colourless, volatile solid was the first non-organometallic hydride (i.e., lacking a metal-carbon bond).

With an interest in cyclometallation, he discovered one of the first pincer complexes via the orthometalation of 1,3-C_{6}H_{4}(CH_{2}PBu^{t}_{2})_{2}.

== Honours and awards ==
- He was awarded a Tilden Prize of the Royal Society of Chemistry in 1974
- He was elected a Fellow of the Royal Society in 1978.

== Death ==
Shaw died on 8 November 2020, aged 90. A short (18 minute) video of his funeral service, held during covid lockdown, is available here.
