= Quadricyclane =

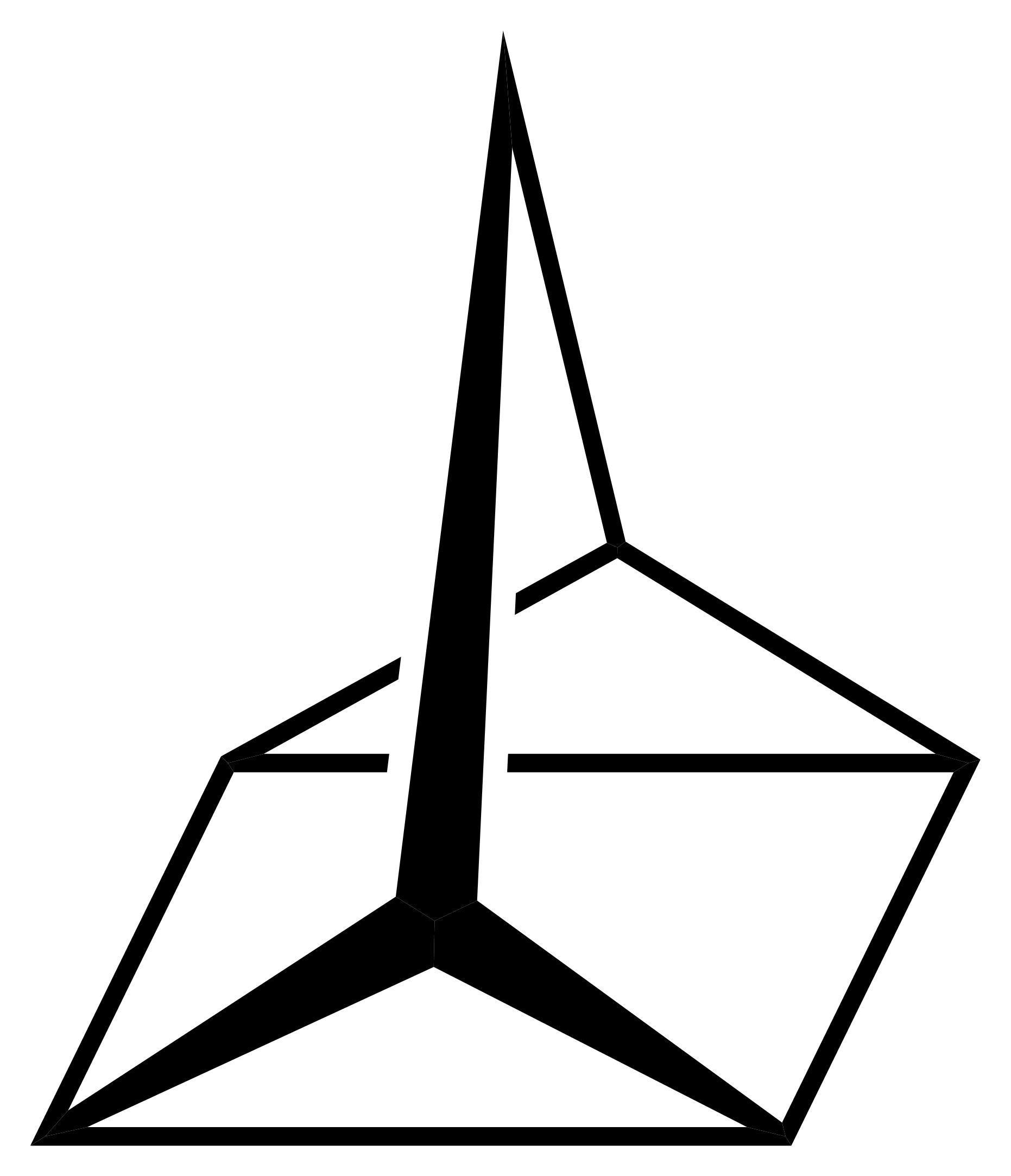

Names
- Preferred IUPAC name Tetracyclo[3.2.0.0^{2,7}.0^{4,6}]heptane
- Other names quadricyclo[2.2.1.0^{2,6}.0^{3.5}]heptane, tetracyclo[2.2.1.0^{2,6}.0^{3.5}]heptane

Identifiers
CAS Number	278-06-8
3D model (JSmol)	Interactive image
ChemSpider	30796462
ECHA InfoCard	100.005.450
EC Number	205-994-1
PubChem CID	78961
UNII	8E0K9BG24C
CompTox Dashboard (EPA)	DTXSID30182121
- InChI: InChI=1S/C7H8/c1-2-4-5(2)7-3(1)6(4)7/h2-7H,1H2/t2-,3+,4+,5-,6+,7- Key: DGZUEIPKRRSMGK-BEOVHNCFSA-N; InChI=1/C7H8/c1-2-4-5(2)7-3(1)6(4)7/h2-7H,1H2/t2-,3+,4+,5-,6+,7- Key: DGZUEIPKRRSMGK-BEOVHNCFBK
- SMILES: C1C2C3C2C4C1C34

Properties
Chemical formula	C_{7}H_{8}
Molar mass	92.14 g/mol
Density	0.982 g/cm^{3}
Melting point	−44 °C (−47 °F; 229 K)
Boiling point	108 °C (226 °F; 381 K) at 987 hPa
Solubility in water	Insoluble

Hazards
- GHS labelling
Pictograms	(GHS02: Flammable) (GHS06: Toxic)
Signal word	Danger
Hazard statements	H226, H330
Precautionary statements	P210, P260, P284, P310
- Except where otherwise noted, data are given for materials in their standard state (at 25 °C [77 °F], 100 kPa). verify (what is ?) Infobox references

Quadricyclane is a strained, multi-cyclic hydrocarbon with the formula CH_{2}(CH)_{6}. A volatile colorless liquid, it is highly strained molecule (78.7 kcal/mol). Isomerization of quadricyclane proceeds slowly at low temperatures. Because of quadricyclane's strained structure and thermal stability, it has been studied extensively.

== Preparation ==
Quadricyclane is produced by the irradiation of norbornadiene (bicyclo[2.2.1]hepta-2,5-diene) in the presence of Michler's ketone or ethyl Michler's ketone. Other sensitizers, such as acetone, benzophenone, acetophenone, etc., may be used but with lesser yield. The yield is higher for freshly distilled norbornadiene, but commercial reagents will suffice.

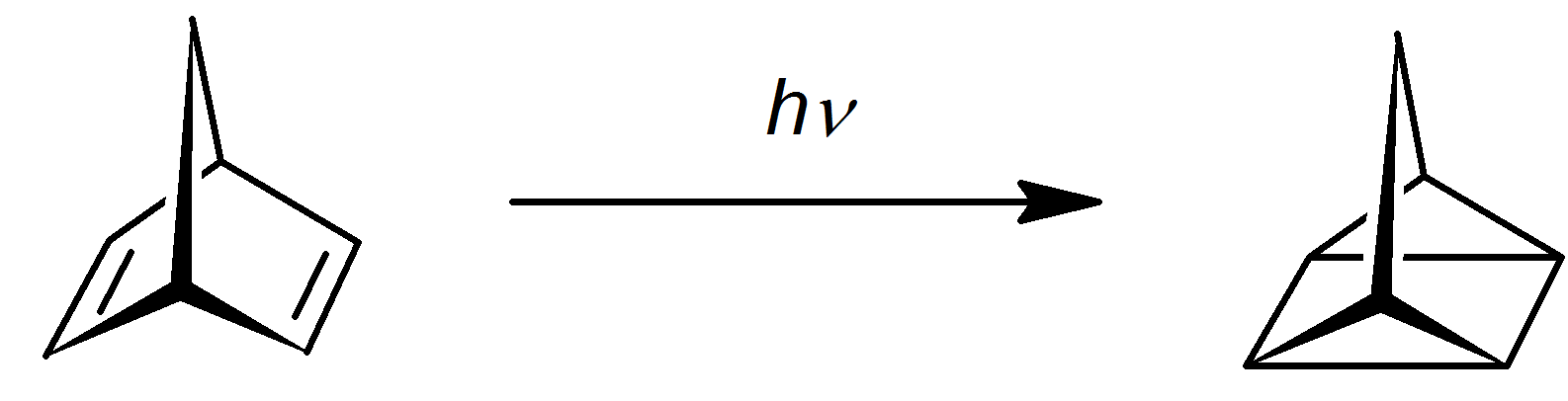

== Proposed applications to solar energy ==
The conversion of norbornadiene into quadricyclane is achieved with ~300 nm UV radiation. When converted back to norbornadiene, ring strain energy is liberated in the form of heat (ΔH = −89 kJ/mol). This reaction has been proposed to store solar energy. However, the absorption edge of light does not extend past 300 nm whereas most solar radiation has wavelengths longer than 400 nm. Quadricyclane's relative stability and high energy content have also given rise to its use as a propellant additive or fuel. However, quadricyclane undergoes thermal decomposition at relatively low temperatures (less than 400 °C). This property limits its applications, as propulsion systems may operate at temperatures exceeding 500 °C.

== Reactions ==
Quadricyclane readily reacts with acetic acid to give a mixture of nortricyclyl acetate and exo-norbornyl acetate. Quadricyclane also reacts with many dienophiles to form 1:1 adducts.
