= (Norbornadiene)molybdenum tetracarbonyl =

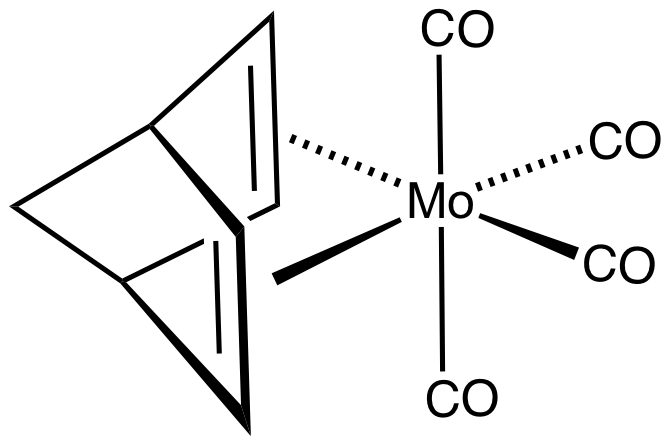

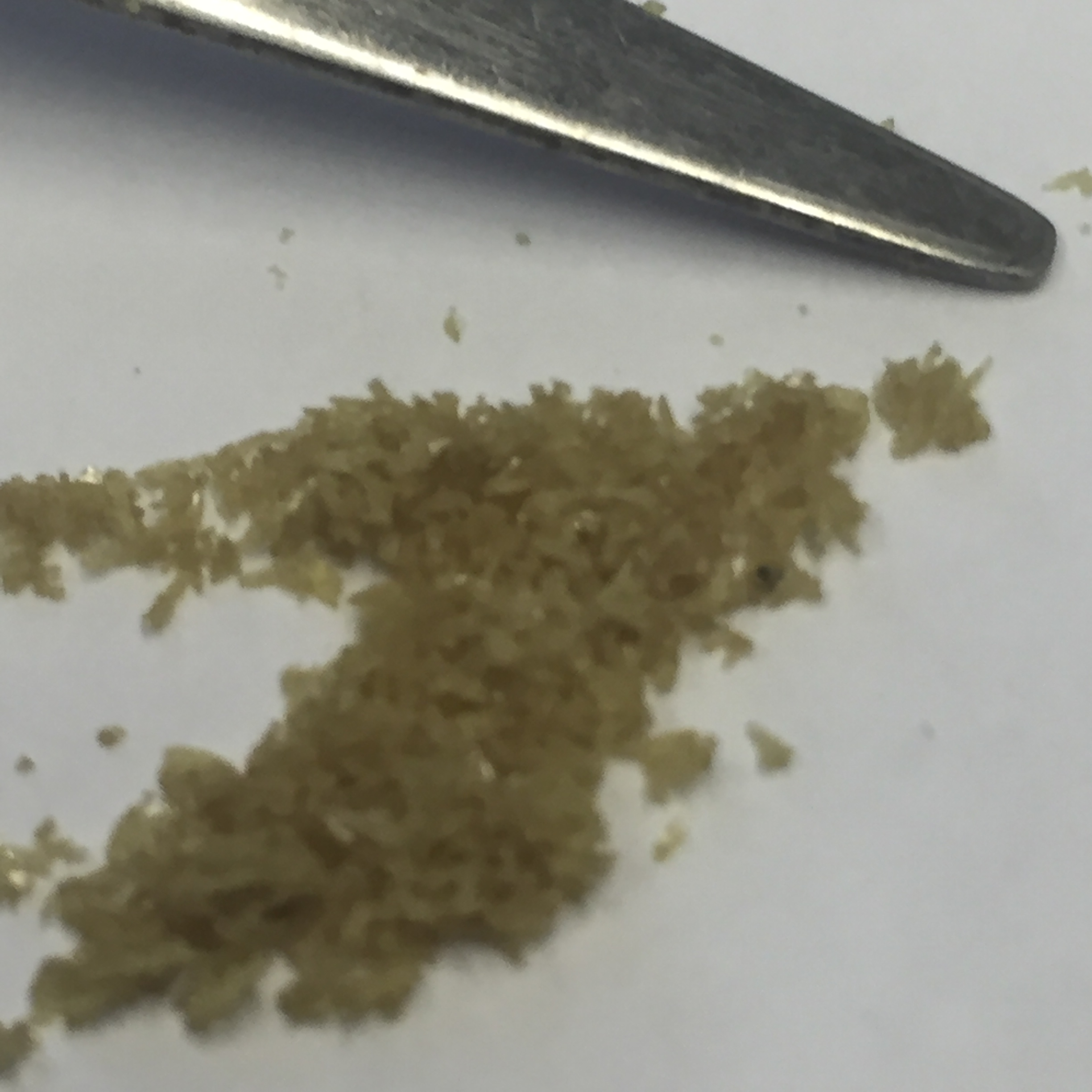

Identifiers
CAS Number	12146-37-1
3D model (JSmol)	Interactive image
ChemSpider	452413
ECHA InfoCard	100.151.941
PubChem CID	11370028
CompTox Dashboard (EPA)	DTXSID90153276
- InChI: InChI=1S/C7H8.4CO.Mo/c1-2-7-4-3-6(1)5-7;4*1-2;/h1-4,6-7H,5H2;;;;; Key: UZHYHBPCAGKHGZ-UHFFFAOYSA-N
- SMILES: [C-]#[O+].[C-]#[O+].[C-]#[O+].[C-]#[O+].C1C2C=CC1C=C2.[Mo]

Properties
Chemical formula	C_{11}H_{8}MoO_{4}
Molar mass	300.13 g·mol^{−1}

Hazards
- GHS labelling
Pictograms	(GHS07: Exclamation mark)
Signal word	Warning
Hazard statements	H302, H312, H315, H319, H332, H335
Precautionary statements	P261, P264, P270, P271, P280, P301+P312, P302+P352, P304+P312, P304+P340, P305+P351+P338, P312, P321, P322, P330, P332+P313, P337+P313, P362, P363, P403+P233, P405, P501
- Except where otherwise noted, data are given for materials in their standard state (at 25 °C [77 °F], 100 kPa). Infobox references

(Norbornadiene)molybdenum tetracarbonyl is the organomolybdenum compound with the formula (C_{7}H_{9})Mo(CO)_{4}. Structurally, the compound consists of the norbornadiene bonded to a Mo(CO)_{4} fragment. The compound is a yellow, volatile solid. It is prepared by thermal or photochemical substitution of molybdenum hexacarbonyl. The compound was originally examined as a potential antiknock agent.

(Norbornadiene)molybdenum tetracarbonyl is a precursor to other derivatives of the type L_{2}Mo(CO)_{4}. This conversion exploits the lability of the diene ligand:

(C_{7}H_{9})Mo(CO)_{4} + 2 L → C_{7}H_{9} + L_{2}Mo(CO)_{4}
