= Chlorobis(cyclooctene)rhodium dimer =

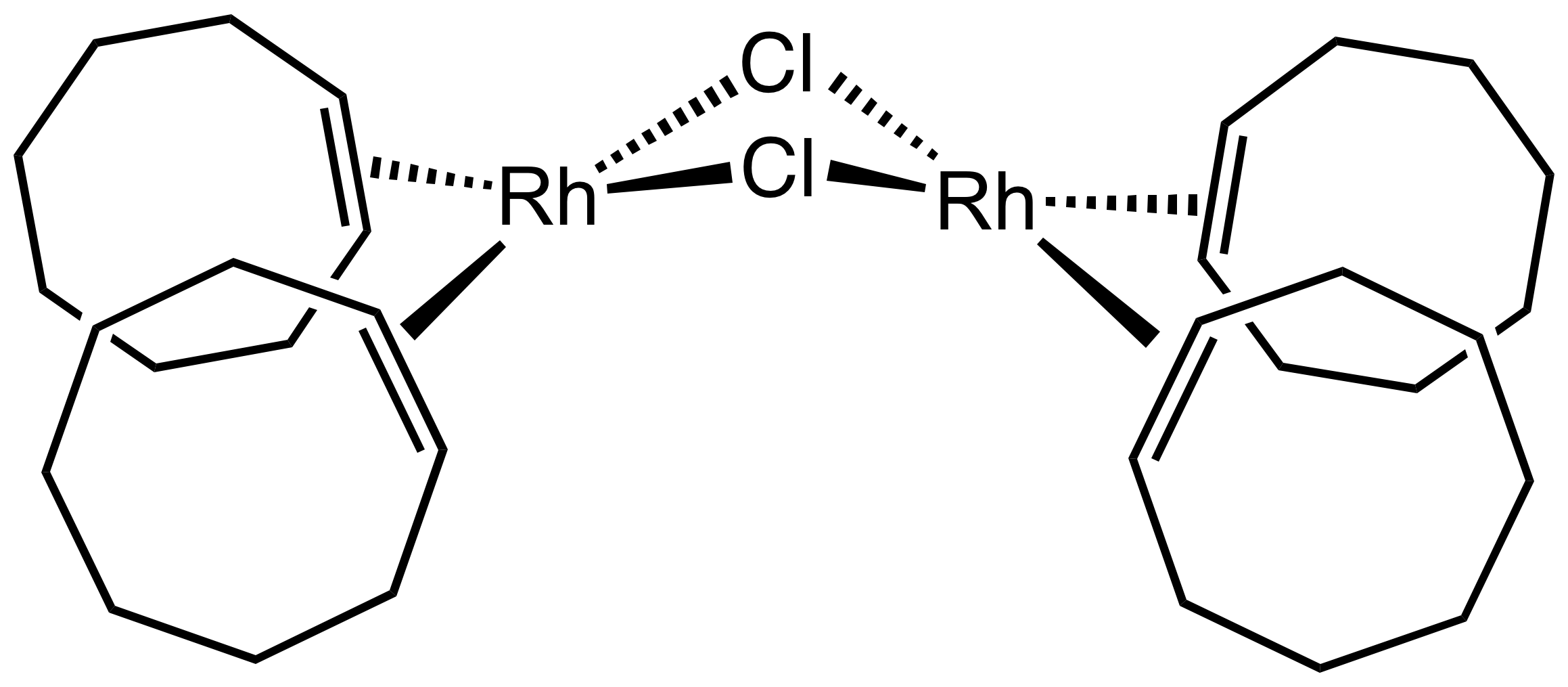

Identifiers
CAS Number	12279-09-3
3D model (JSmol)	Interactive image
ChemSpider	21613963
ECHA InfoCard	100.152.028
PubChem CID	53384308
CompTox Dashboard (EPA)	DTXSID00693673
- InChI: InChI=1S/4C8H14.2ClH.2Rh/c4*1-2-4-6-8-7-5-3-1;;;;/h4*1-2H,3-8H2;2*1H;;/p-2/b4*2-1-;;;; Key: ZFCBAJWXKUDJSW-XFCUKONHSA-L
- SMILES: C1CCCC=CCC1.C1CCCC=CCC1.C1CCCC=CCC1.C1CCCC=CCC1.[Cl-].[Cl-].[Rh].[Rh]

Properties
Chemical formula	C_{32}H_{56}Cl_{2}Rh_{2}
Molar mass	717.50
Appearance	red-brown solid

Hazards
- GHS labelling
Pictograms	(GHS07: Exclamation mark)
Signal word	Warning
Hazard statements	H302, H312, H315, H319, H332, H335
Precautionary statements	P261, P264, P270, P271, P280, P301+P312, P302+P352, P304+P312, P304+P340, P305+P351+P338, P312, P321, P322, P330, P332+P313, P337+P313, P362, P363, P403+P233, P405, P501
- Except where otherwise noted, data are given for materials in their standard state (at 25 °C [77 °F], 100 kPa). Infobox references

Chlorobis(cyclooctene)rhodium dimer is an organorhodium compound with the formula Rh_{2}Cl_{2}(C_{8}H_{14})_{4}, where C_{8}H_{14} is cis-cyclooctene. Sometimes abbreviated Rh_{2}Cl_{2}(coe)_{4}, it is a red-brown, air-sensitive solid that is a precursor to many other organorhodium compounds and catalysts.

The complex is prepared by treating an alcohol solution of hydrated rhodium trichloride with cyclooctene at room temperature. The coe ligands are easily displaced by other more basic ligands, more so than the diene ligands in the related complex cyclooctadiene rhodium chloride dimer.

== Catalyst for C-H activation ==
C-H activation is often catalyzed by chlorobis(cyclooctene)rhodium dimer as demonstrated in the synthesis of a strained bicyclic enamine.

C–H bond activation Yotphan 2008

The synthesis of a mescaline analogue involves enantioselective annulation of an aryl imine via a C-H activation.

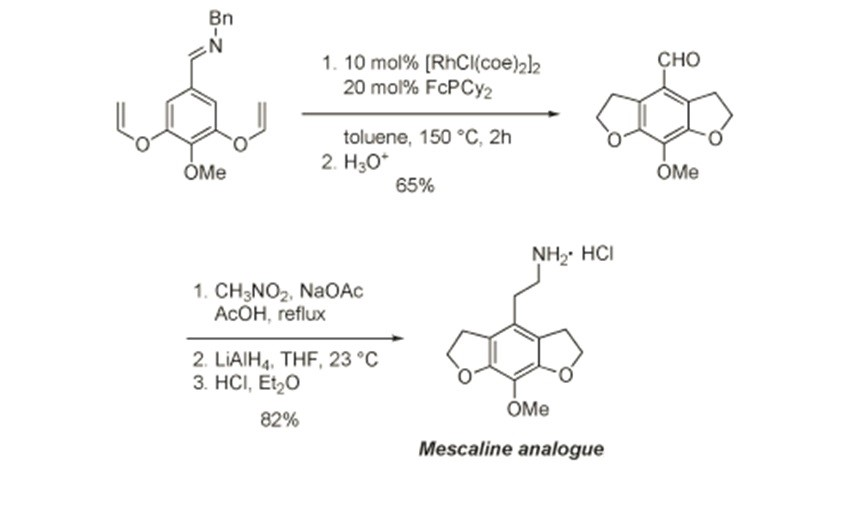

The total synthesis of lithospermic acid employs "guided C-H functionalization" late stage to a highly functionalized system. The directing group, a chiral nonracemic imine, is capable of performing an intramolecular alkylation, which allows for the rhodium-catalyzed conversion of imine to the dihydrobenzofuran.

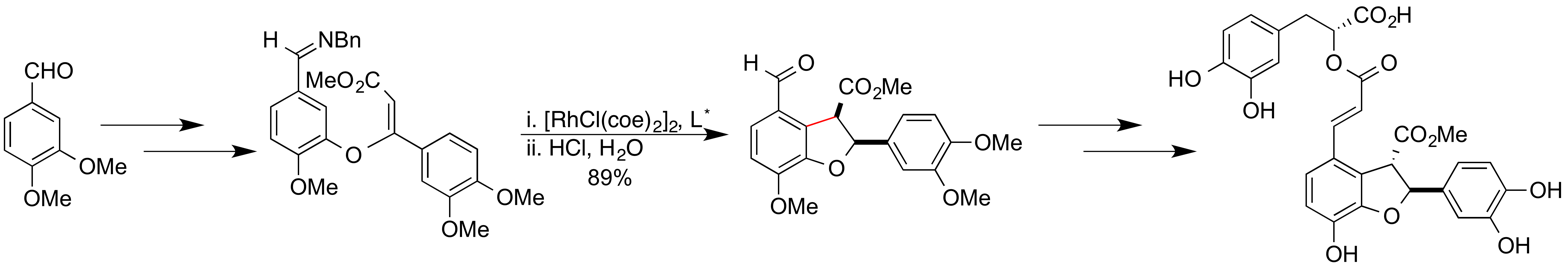
Key step in synthesis of lithospermic acid
