= Cyclooctadiene rhodium chloride dimer =

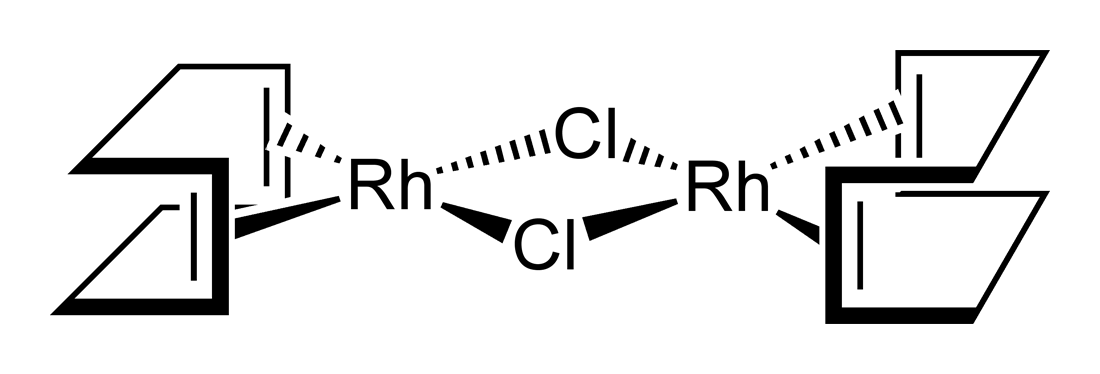

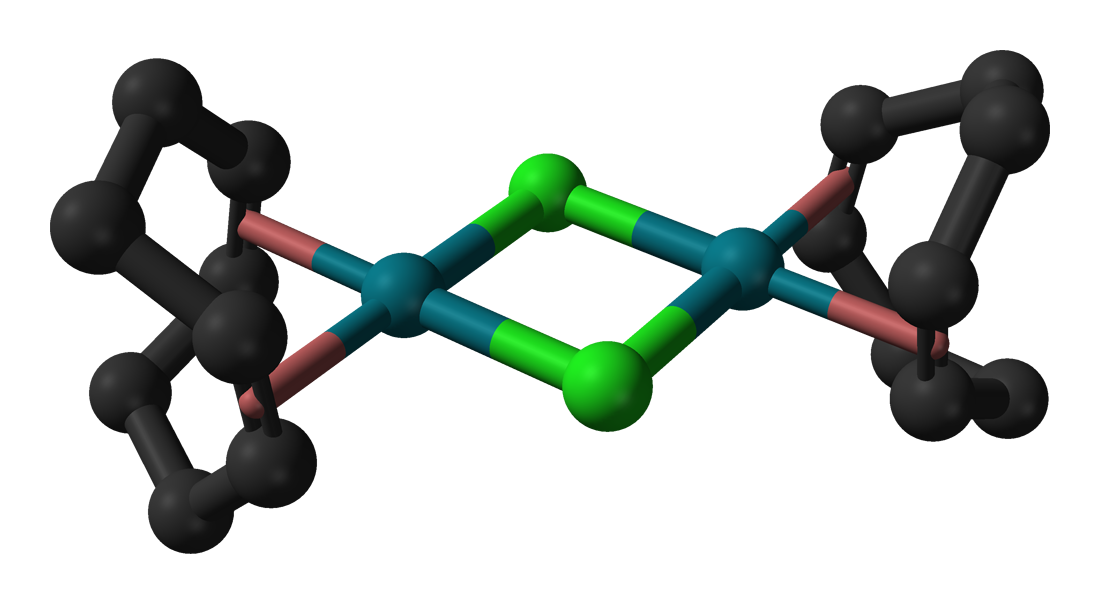

Names
- IUPAC name di-μ-chlorido-bis[η^{2},η^{2}-(cycloocta-1,5-diene)rhodium]
- Other names Cyclooctadiene rhodium chloride dimer

Identifiers
| CAS Number | 12092-47-6 |
| 3D model (JSmol) | Interactive image |
| ChemSpider | 21171524 |
| ECHA InfoCard | 100.031.949 |
| EC Number | 235-157-6 |
| PubChem CID | 6436379 |
| UNII | 7BR4HR5Q6M |
| CompTox Dashboard (EPA) | DTXSID20923606 |
- InChI: InChI=1S/2C8H12.2ClH.2Rh/c2*1-2-4-6-8-7-5-3-1;;;;/h2*1-2,7-8H,3-6H2;2*1H;;/q;;;;2*+1/p-2/b2*2-1-,8-7-;;;; Key: QSUDXYGZLAJAQU-MIXQCLKLSA-L; InChI=1/2C8H12.2ClH.2Rh/c2*1-2-4-6-8-7-5-3-1;;;;/h2*1-2,7-8H,3-6H2;2*1H;;/q;;;;2*+1/p-2/b2*2-1-,8-7-;;;;/r2C8H12.2ClRh/c2*1-2-4-6-8-7-5-3-1;2*1-2/h2*1-2,7-8H,3-6H2;;/b2*2-1-,8-7-;; Key: QSUDXYGZLAJAQU-PXXGERDABU
- SMILES: Cl1[Rh]Cl[Rh]1.C=1CC\C=C/CCC=1.C/1C\C=C/CC\C=C\1

Properties
| Chemical formula | C_{16}H_{24}Cl_{2}Rh_{2} |
| Molar mass | 493.08 g·mol^{−1} |
| Density | 1.93 g/cm^{3} |
| Melting point | 243 °C (469 °F; 516 K) |
| Solubility | dichloromethane |

Hazards
- GHS labelling
| Pictograms | (GHS07: Exclamation mark) (GHS09: Environmental hazard) |
| Signal word | Warning |
| Hazard statements | H302, H315, H317, H319, H335, H411 |
| Precautionary statements | P261, P264, P270, P271, P272, P273, P280, P301+P312, P302+P352, P304+P340, P305+P351+P338, P312, P321, P330, P332+P313, P333+P313, P337+P313, P362, P363, P391, P403+P233, P405, P501 |
- Except where otherwise noted, data are given for materials in their standard state (at 25 °C [77 °F], 100 kPa). verify (what is ?) Infobox references

Cyclooctadiene rhodium chloride dimer is the organorhodium compound with the formula Rh_{2}Cl_{2}(C_{8}H_{12})_{2}, commonly abbreviated [RhCl(COD)]_{2} or Rh_{2}Cl_{2}(COD)_{2}. This yellow-orange, air-stable compound is a widely used precursor to homogeneous catalysts.

== Preparation and reactions ==
The synthesis of [RhCl(COD)]_{2} involves heating a solution of hydrated rhodium trichloride with 1,5-cyclooctadiene in aqueous ethanol in the presence of sodium carbonate:

2 RhCl_{3}·3H_{2}O + 2 COD + 2 CH_{3}CH_{2}OH + 2 Na_{2}CO_{3} → [RhCl(COD)]_{2} + 2 CH_{3}CHO + 8 H_{2}O + 2 CO_{2} + 4 NaCl

[RhCl(COD)]_{2} is principally used as a source of the electrophile "[Rh(COD)]^{+}."

[RhCl(COD)]_{2} + nL → [L_{n}Rh(COD)]^{+}Cl^{−} (where L = PR_{3}, alkene, etc. and n = 2 or 3)

In this way, chiral phosphines can be attached to Rh. The resulting chiral complexes are capable of asymmetric hydrogenation. A related but still more reactive complex is chlorobis(cyclooctene)rhodium dimer. The dimer reacts with a variety of Lewis bases (L) to form adducts with the stoichiometry RhCl(L)(COD).

== Structure ==
The molecule consists of a pair of square planar Rh centers bound to a 1,5-cyclooctadiene and two chloride ligands that are shared between the Rh centers. The Rh_{2}Cl_{2} core is also approximately planar, in contrast to the highly bent structure of cyclooctadiene iridium chloride dimer where the dihedral angle is 86°.
