= Benjamin (disambiguation) =

Benjamin is a figure in the Hebrew Bible.

Benjamin may also refer to:

== Benjamin as sole name, or religious name ==
- Tribe of Benjamin, one of the Tribes of Israel
- Benjamin (Khazar), ruler during the 9th–10th centuries CE
- Saint Benjamin (disambiguation), multiple people
- Benjamin of Tudela (1130–1173), 12th century Spanish rabbi
- Benjamin II, pen name of J. J. Benjamin (1818–1864), Romanian-Jewish historian and traveller; in allusion to Benjamin of Tudela
- Pope Benjamin I of Alexandria (590–661), Coptic Pope
- Pope Benjamin II of Alexandria (died 1339), Coptic Pope
- Benjamin (Fedchenkov) (1880–1961), Russian orthodox bishop
- Benjamin (born 1974), pen name of manhua artist Zhang Bin
- King Benjamin, a figure in the Book of Mormon
- Benjamin (singer) (born 1997), Finnish recording artist

== People with the first name or surname Benjamin ==
- Benjamin (name)

== Tribe of Benjamin members ==
Occasionally called as members of the tribe of Benjamin are:

- Queen Esther, also known as Hadassah, the cousin of Mordecai the Jew - see the Book of Esther
- Mordecai the Jew, from the Tribe of Benjamin - see Esther 2:5
- Paul of Tarsus, from the Tribe of Benjamin - see Romans 11:1 and Phillipians 3:5
- Saul, the first king of Israel - see 1 Samuel 9

== Other ==
- Benjamin, Missouri, a community in the United States
- Benjamin, Texas, a community in the United States
- Benjamin tree (disambiguation), a tree that produces benzoin that can be used in perfumery
- Benjamin the thylacine (died 1936), a Tasmanian tiger or thylacine
- Benjamin (1968 film), French film
- Benjamin (2018 British film), a comedy-drama feature film
- Benjamin (2018 American film), a comedy feature film
- Benjamin (automobile), a French manufacturer of cyclecars
- Benjamin, 2005 Beanie Baby bear produced by Ty, Inc.
- United States one-hundred-dollar bill, after the person pictured thereon, Benjamin Franklin

== See also ==
- Ben (disambiguation)
- Benyamin (disambiguation)
- Benjamina (disambiguation)
- The Curious Case of Benjamin Button (disambiguation)
