= Transit camp =

Transit camp may refer to:

- Military camp
- Transit Prisoner-of-war camp
- Transit internment camp
- Transit refugee camp
- Transit concentration camp, in particular,
  - Durchgangslager of Nazi concentration camps
- Transit Camp (film), a 1932 French-German drama film
- Ma'abarot, Hebrew word for transit immigrant and refugee camp, established in the mid-20th-century
- Transit Camp F.C., a football club based in Dar es Salaam, playing in the Tanzania Championship.
