= One Million Plan =

1944 plan for Jewish immigration into Mandatory Palestine

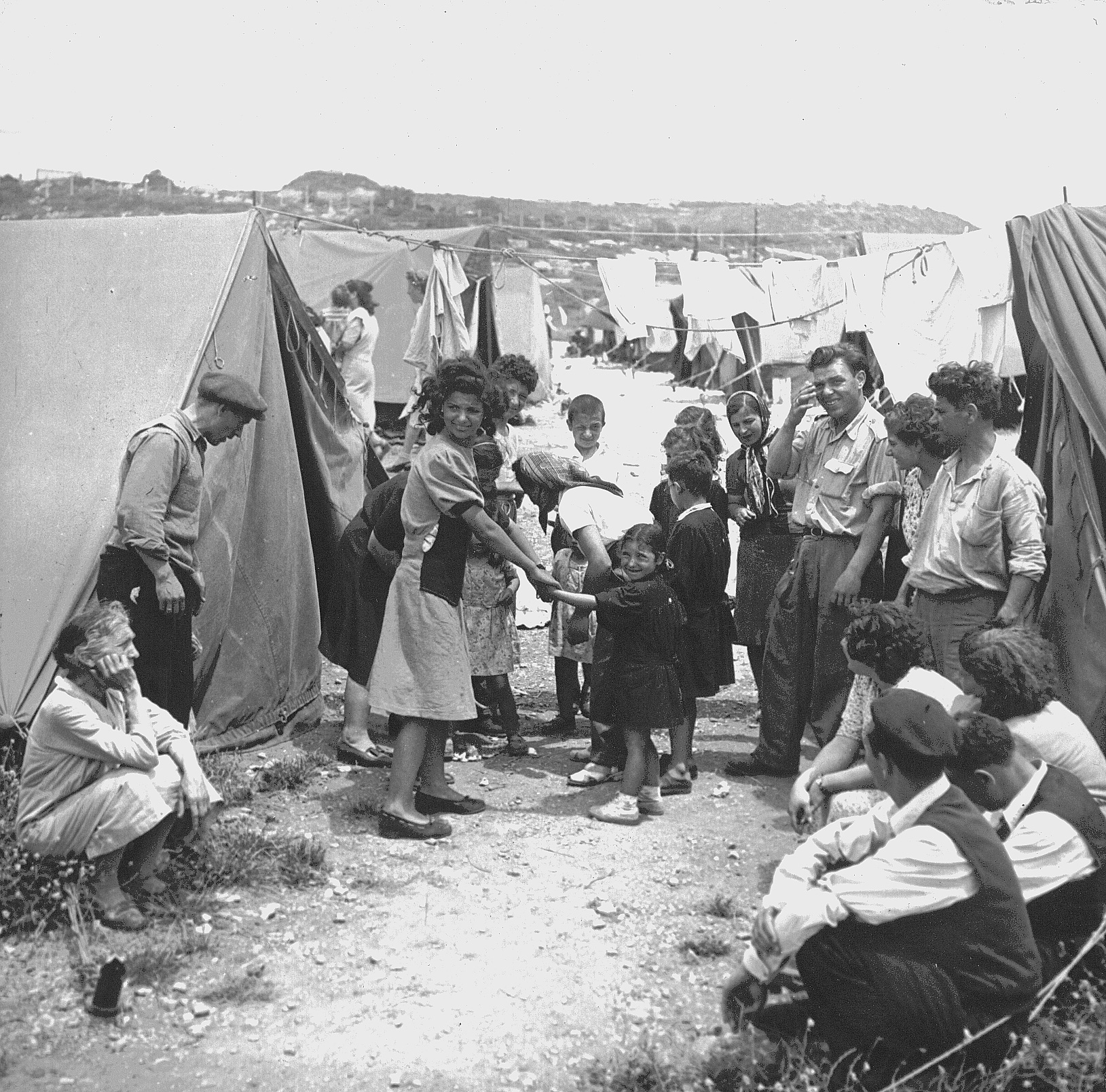
The plan included detailed proposals for immigration and transit camps; the subsequent Immigrant camps and ma'abarot have been described as "a product of" the One Million Plan.

The One Million Plan (Hebrew: תוכנית המיליון, romanized: Tochnit hamillion) was a strategic plan for the immigration and absorption of one million Jews primarily from the Middle East and North Africa into Mandatory Palestine, within a timeframe of 18 months, in order to establish a state in that territory. After being voted on by the Jewish Agency for Palestine Executive in 1944, it became the official policy of the Zionist leadership. Implementation of a significant part of the One Million Plan took place following the establishment of the State of Israel in 1948.

When the extent of the decimation of Jews in the Holocaust became known in 1944, the Biltmore Conference ambition of two million immigrants was revised downwards, and the plan was revised to include, for the first time, Jews from the Middle East and North Africa as a single category within the target of an immigration plan. In 1944–45, Ben-Gurion described the plan to foreign officials as being the "primary goal and top priority of the Zionist movement."

The ongoing immigration restrictions of the British White Paper of 1939 meant that such a plan was not able to be put into immediate effect. Upon the establishment of Israel, Ben Gurion's government presented the Knesset with a new plan – to double the population of 600,000 within four years. Israeli historian Devorah Hacohen describes the opposition against this immigration policy within the new Israeli government, such as those who argued that there was "no justification for organizing large-scale emigration among Jews whose lives were not in danger, particularly when the desire and motivation were not their own", as well as those who argued that the absorption process caused "undue hardship". However, the force of Ben-Gurion's influence and insistence ensured that unrestricted immigration continued. The plan has been described as "a pivotal event in 'imagining' the Jewish state" and "the moment when the category of Mizrahi Jews in the current sense of this term, as an ethnic group distinct from European-born Jews, was invented." The large scale immigration in the first few years after Israel's declaration was the product of this policy change in favour of mass immigration focused on Jews from Arab and Muslim countries.

== Background ==
At the 1942 Biltmore Conference, Ben-Gurion promoted the idea of two million Jews emigrating to Palestine in order to build the Jewish majority required to create the Jewish Commonwealth called for at the conference. It was assumed at the time that most of the immigrants would be Ashkenazi Jews. Ben-Gurion described his intentions to a meeting of experts and Jewish leaders:

Our Zionist policy must now pay special attention to the Jewish population groups in the Arab countries. If there are diasporas that it is our obligation to eliminate with the greatest possible urgency by bringing those Jews to the homeland, it is the Arab diasporas: Yemen, Iraq, Syria, Egypt, and North Africa, as well as the Jews of Persia and Turkey. What European Jewry is now experiencing obliges us to be especially anxious about the fate of the diasporas in the Middle East. Those Jewish groups are the hostages of Zionism ... Our first move with a view toward coming events is immigration. But the paths of immigration from Europe are desolate now. The [doors] are shut tight, and there are very few countries that have a land link to the Land of Israel – the neighboring countries. All these considerations are cause for anxiety and for special activity to move the Jews in the Arab countries to the land of Israel speedily. It is a mark of great failure by Zionism that we have not yet eliminated the Yemen exile [diaspora]. If we do not eliminate the Iraq exile by Zionist means, there is a danger that it will be eliminated by Hitlerite means.

== The Planning Committee ==
Ben-Gurion had requested an initial analysis on the absorptive potential on the country in early 1941, and in late 1942 commissioned a "master plan" for the proposed immigration. He appointed a committee of experts, a Planning Committee, to explore how the economy of Mandatory Palestine could support a million new Jewish Immigrants.

The Planning Committee (ועדת התיכון, also known as "The Committee of the Four"), was established in order to develop a blueprint and decide its guiding principles, and to create sub-committees of experts for various sectors, and supervise their work. Ben-Gurion believed that by choosing the members of the committee, he would be able to garner support both for the planning arrangements and their political aspects. Ben-Gurion was chairman of the committee, which also included Eliezer Kaplan, treasurer of the Jewish Agency, Eliezer Hoofien, Chairman of the Anglo-Palestine Bank, Emil Shmorek, head of the department of trade and industry at the Jewish Agency, and a three-person secretariat consisting of economists.

The committee convened for the first time on October 11, 1943, at Kaplan's home, where the decision was taken to convene weekly at the Jewish Agency building in Jerusalem. Ben-Gurion participated regularly and examined the sub-committee reports in detail. The committee established sub-committees consisting of experts to examine the planning issues regarding development of land, water, settlement, industry, transportation, habitation, finance and more. The Planning Committee submitted reports throughout 1944 and the beginning of 1945.

Among the first things discussed by the committee was the definition of its goals. Ben-Gurion declared two goals: 1. The settlement of two million Jews within 18 months, and the elaboration of a plan to facilitate such settlement, and 2. Scientific investigation of the facts related to such settlement, such as the quantity of water required, the nature of the soil, climate, and so on. The other members of the committee found the first goal unrealistic. Eventually Ben-Gurion relented and agreed to two plans. The "big" plan – rapid settlement of a million Jews and the creation of a Jewish majority and Jewish rule – and the "small" plan, the settlement of another million Jews within a few years.

== The plan ==
[The One Million Plan's] importance was on the level of principle, because it reflected the attitude of the Zionist institutions toward the Jews of Islamic countries as potential citizens of the Jewish state, a commitment to their welfare and safety and acknowledgment of the importance of Zionist activity among them. This message that Palestine wanted Jewish immigrants from Islamic countries came through loud and clear, and its echoes could be heard in all the Jewish communities in these countries.

— Esther Meir-Glitzenstein, Zionism in an Arab Country, 2004

The plan, envisioning the arrival of a million Jews over 18 months, was completed in summer 1944, providing details of transportation, refugee camps and the financing required.

The plan was first presented to the Jewish Agency Executive on 24 June 1944, not as an operative plan since the British immigration restrictions were still in place at the time, but as a political plan to formulate the requirements of the Zionist Organization at the end of World War II. From 1944 onwards, the plan became the official policy of the Zionist leadership, and the immigration of Jews from Arab and Muslim countries became "explicit or implicit in all the declarations, testimonies, memoranda and demands issued by the Jewish Agency from World War II until the establishment of the state".

Ben-Gurion saw immigration as the top priority of the Zionist project, but was aware of the challenges of such a large-scale project, stating following the 1948 Arab–Israeli War:

The main thing is absorption of immigrants. This embodies all the historical needs of the state. We might have captured the West Bank, the Golan, the entire Galilee, but those conquests would not have reinforced our territory as much as immigration. Doubling and tripling the number of immigrants gives us more and more strength. ... This is the most important thing above all else. Settlement – that is the real conquest.

The first organizational measure of the Plan was the late 1943 general plan of action entitled "The Uniform Pioneer to the Eastern Lands", which would offer a course for emissaries from the Jewish Agency Immigration Department to later be sent Islamic countries. These activities in Islamic countries lost their urgency and attraction after WWII, and the boost in resources they received dwindled. The number of activists in these countries was minuscule compared to Europe, and there were not even enough of them to maintain what was already established.

== Immigration candidates ==
Investigating sources of immigrants and their scope figured prominently in the deliberations of the Planning Commission. They were presented with much data – the distribution and number of Jews in each country, including population changes during World War II, and analysis of the economic and occupational opportunities in these communities. Using this data, the composition the million immigrants that would come to the country was arrived at. Three main groups were initially considered as candidates for immediate immigration: Jewish Holocaust survivors in Axis countries – about 535,000 people; WWII refugees in neutral and Allied countries, of which an estimated 30% would want to immigrate – 247,000; an estimated 20% of the Jewish population of Islamic countries – 150,000. The possibility of a smaller number of people from the first groups was taken into consideration, in which case there would be more immigrants from the third group. In mid-1944, as the extent of the Holocaust became known, focusing of attention on potential immigration from Muslim countries began. The main focus of the plan was Jews from Iraq, Syria, Turkey, Iran, and Yemen.

As the scale of the Holocaust became clearer, the share of Jews from Arab and Muslim countries in the plan was increased. In July 1943, Eliyahu Dobkin, the head of the Jewish Agency's immigration department, presented a map of the estimated 750,000 Jews in Islamic countries, and noted that:

… many of the Jews in Europe will perish in the Holocaust and the Jews of Russia are locked in. Therefore, the quantitative value of these three-quarters of a million Jews has risen to the level of a highly valuable political factor within the framework of world Jewry. The primary task we face is to rescue this Jewry, [and] the time has come to mount an assault on this Jewry for a Zionist conquest.

Similarly, Ben-Gurion stated at a meeting of the Jewish Agency Executive on 28 September 1944 that "My minimum used to be two million: now that we have been annihilated l say one million". On 30 July 1945, Ben-Gurion stated in his diary:

We have to bring over all of Bloc 5 [the Jews of Islamic countries], most of Bloc 4 [Western Europe], everything possible from Bloc 3 [Eastern Europe], and pioneers from Bloc 2 [the Jews of English-speaking countries] as soon as possible.

One of the issues that came up during discussions of the One Million Plan was the security of Jewish communities in Islamic countries. In a 1943 Mapai central committee speech, Eliyahu Dobkin stated his view that the creation of Israel in Arab Palestine will create danger for Jews living in other Arab countries. and Ben-Gurion wrote at a similar time of "the catastrophe that the Jews in eastern lands are expected to face as a result of Zionism."

Policies were put in place to enhance Zionist activity in the target countries to ensure the immigrants would come. Esther Meir-Glitzenstein notes that "Interestingly, Ben-Gurion cites political and rational reasons for bringing Jewish displaced persons from Europe, whereas in discussing the immigration of the Jews from Islamic countries he mentions not only a political and rational reason, but also a cultural-orientalist explanation, since the 'degeneration' of the East was one of the basic elements of this perception."

== Following establishment of Israel ==
Implementation of a significant part of the One Million Plan's plans and recommendations took place in the newly established State of Israel, following its creation of in 1948. This included mass Aliyah, the setting up of Immigrant camps and Ma'abarot, the Reparations Agreement between Israel and West Germany, the National Water Carrier of Israel and the National Outline Plan.

As a result of the withdrawal of British forces and the declaration of the State of Israel in May 1948, the immigration restrictions to the country were removed, making it possible to implement the policy changes relating to large-scale Aliyah focused on Jews from Arab and Muslim countries. Ben Gurion's government subsequently presented the Knesset with a plan to double the population of 600,000 within four years. This immigration policy had some opposition within the new Israeli government, such as those who argued that there was "no justification for organizing large-scale emigration among Jews whose lives were not in danger, particularly when the desire and motivation were not their own" as well as those who argued that the absorption process caused "undue hardship". However, the force of Ben-Gurion's influence and insistence ensured that unrestricted immigration continued.

According to Dr Irit Katz, the ma'abarot camps were the product of the One Million Plan. Dr Roy Kozlovsky notes that the prior existence of the One Million Plan suggests that "the concept of the ma'abara was in fact the precondition for, not the effect of, mass immigration". Dr Piera Rossetto described the debate around the conditions of the Ma'abarot, stating her opinion that "the most controversial issue in this respect is not the outcome (e.g. the ma’abarot) of the choice, rather the choice in itself to bring to Israel so many thousands of immigrants, following the idea of the “One Million Plan” unveiled by Ben Gurion in 1944".

== Bibliography ==
- Barell, Ari; Ohana, David (2014), "'The Million Plan': Zionism, Political Theology and Scientific Utopianism", Politics, Religion & Ideology, 15 (1): 1–22, doi:10.1080/21567689.2013.849587, S2CID 144850545
- Hacohen, Dvorah (1991), "BenGurion and the Second World War", in Jonathan Frankel (ed.), Studies in Contemporary Jewry : Volume VII: Jews and Messianism in the Modern Era: Metaphor and Meaning, Oxford University Press, ISBN 978-0-19-536198-8
- Hacohen, Dvora [in Hebrew] (1994), Tochnit hamillion [The One Million Plan] ("תוכנית המיליון, תוכניתו של דוד בן-גוריון לעלייה המונית בשנים 1942- 1945"), Tel Aviv: Ministry of Defense Publishing House
- Hacohen, Devorah (2003), Immigrants in Turmoil: Mass Immigration to Israel and Its Repercussions in the 1950s and After, Syracuse University Press, ISBN 978-0-8156-2969-6
- Eyal, Gil (2006), "The "One Million Plan" and the Development of a Discourse about the Absorption of the Jews from Arab Countries", The Disenchantment of the Orient: Expertise in Arab Affairs and the Israeli State, Stanford University Press, pp. 86–89, ISBN 978-0-8047-5403-3
- Katz, Irit (2016). "Camp evolution and Israel's creation: between 'state of emergency' and 'emergence of state'". Political Geography. 55: 144–155. doi:10.1016/j.polgeo.2016.09.003.
- Katz, Yossi (2000). "Tourism in the Land of Israel in Mandate times: Programs by the Zionist establishment to advance the industry, 1940s until the establishment of the State". In Pinhas Genosar (ed.). Revival of Israel Studies ("עיונים בתקומת ישראל"). Ben-Gurion University Press. ISSN 0792-7169.
- Kozlovsky, Roy (2011). "Temporal States of Architecture: Mass Immigration and Provisional Housing in Israel". In Isenstadt, Sandy; Rizvi, Kishwar (eds.). Modernism and the Middle East: Architecture and Politics in the Twentieth Century. University of Washington Press. pp. 139–160. ISBN 978-0-295-80030-1.
- Meir-Glitzenstein, Esther (2004), "The Reversal in Zionist Policy vis-a-vis the Jews of Islamic Countries: The One Million Plan", Zionism in an Arab Country: Jews in Iraq in the 1940s, Routledge, pp. 35–47, ISBN 978-1-135-76862-1
- Ofer, Dalia (1991), Escaping the Holocaust illegal immigration to the land of Israel, 1939-1944, New York: Oxford University Press, ISBN 978-0-19-506340-0
- Ofer, Dalia (1991a), "Illegal Immigration During the Second World War: Its Suspension and Subsequent Resumption", in Jonathan Frankel (ed.), Studies in Contemporary Jewry : Volume VII: Jews and Messianism in the Modern Era: Metaphor and Meaning, Oxford University Press, ISBN 978-0-19-536198-8
- Ohana, David (5 June 2017). Nationalizing Judaism: Zionism as a Theological Ideology. Lexington Books. ISBN 978-1-4985-4361-3.
- Picard, Avi (2018). "Building the country or rescuing the people: Ben-Gurion's attitude towards mass Jewish immigration to Israel in the mid-1950s". Middle Eastern Studies. 54 (3): 382–399. doi:10.1080/00263206.2017.1414698. S2CID 148734935.
- Rossetto, Piera (November 2012). Emanuela Trevisan Semi; Piera Rossetto (eds.). "Space of Transit, Place of Memory: Ma'abarah and Literary Landscapes of Arab Jews; in Memory and Forgetting among Jews from the Arab-Muslim Countries. Contested Narratives of a Shared Past". Quest. Issues in Contemporary Jewish History. 4. Archived from the original on 2019-09-26.
- Segev, Tom (1998). 1949, the first Israelis. New York: Henry Holt. ISBN 978-0-8050-5896-3.
- Shenhav, Yehouda (2006), The Arab Jews: A Postcolonial Reading of Nationalism, Religion, and Ethnicity, Stanford University Press, ISBN 978-0-8047-5296-1
  - In Hebrew: Shenhav, Yehouda (2003). הערבים היהודים. Am Oved. ISBN 978-965-13-1613-5.
