= Benjamina =

Benjamina may refer to:

- Benjamina (name), female name
- 976 Benjamina, a dark background asteroid

== See also ==
- Benjamin (disambiguation)
- Benyamin (disambiguation)
- Binyamina
