= The Curious Case of Benjamin Button =

The Curious Case of Benjamin Button may refer to:

- "The Curious Case of Benjamin Button" (short story)
- The Curious Case of Benjamin Button (film)
  - The Curious Case of Benjamin Button (soundtrack)
- The Curious Case of Benjamin Button (musical)
