= Benyamin =

Benyamin may refer to:

- Benyamin Bahadori, Iranian singer
- Benyamin (writer), pen name of Benny Daniel, Indian writer
- Benyamin Sueb, Indonesian Comedian, actor, singer.

== See also ==
- Benjamin (disambiguation)
- Benjamina (disambiguation)
- Benyamina
