= Development town =

Israeli towns established to house new immigrants

Mitzpe Ramon, a development town in southern Israel in 1957

Development towns (Hebrew: עיירת פיתוח, Ayarat Pitu'ah) were new settlements built in Israel during the 1950s in order to provide permanent housing for a large influx of Jews who fled or migrated from Arab and Muslim countries and Holocaust survivors from Europe who arrived to the newly established State of Israel.

The towns were designed to expand the population of the country's peripheral areas while easing pressure on the crowded centre. Most of them were built in the Galilee in the north of Israel, and in the northern Negev desert in the south. In addition to the new towns, Jerusalem was also given development town status in the 1960s.

In the context of the Arab–Israeli conflict, Jews who fled or migrated from Arab and Muslim countries were initially resettled in ma'abarot (Hebrew: מעברת, lit. 'transit (camps)') or immigrant and refugee transit camps, also sometimes called absorption camps, known variously as transit immigrant camps, transit refugee camps, and development towns. Development towns were subsequently considered by some to be places of relegation and marginalisation.

== Background ==
In the aftermath of the establishment of the state in 1948, Israel's population doubled within two years to 1.2 million, as Holocaust survivors and Jews from Muslim countries immigrated in large numbers. At the end of 1949 around 90,000 Jews were housed in ma'abarot, immigrant and refugee absorption camps. By the end of 1951 the number had risen to over 220,000 in around 125 separate communities. The housing consisted of tents and makeshift shacks of tin or wood. Over 80% of the residents were Jews who fled or migrated from Arab and Muslim countries in the Middle East and North Africa. The numbers began to decline in 1952 and the last ma'abarot were closed around 1963. Over time the ma'abarot metamorphosed into towns or were absorbed as neighbourhoods of the towns they were attached to, and residents were provided with permanent housing. Most of the ma'abarot became development towns, with Kiryat Shmona, Sderot, Beit She'an, Yokneam Illit, Or Yehuda and Migdal HaEmek all originating as ma'abarot.

== Establishment ==
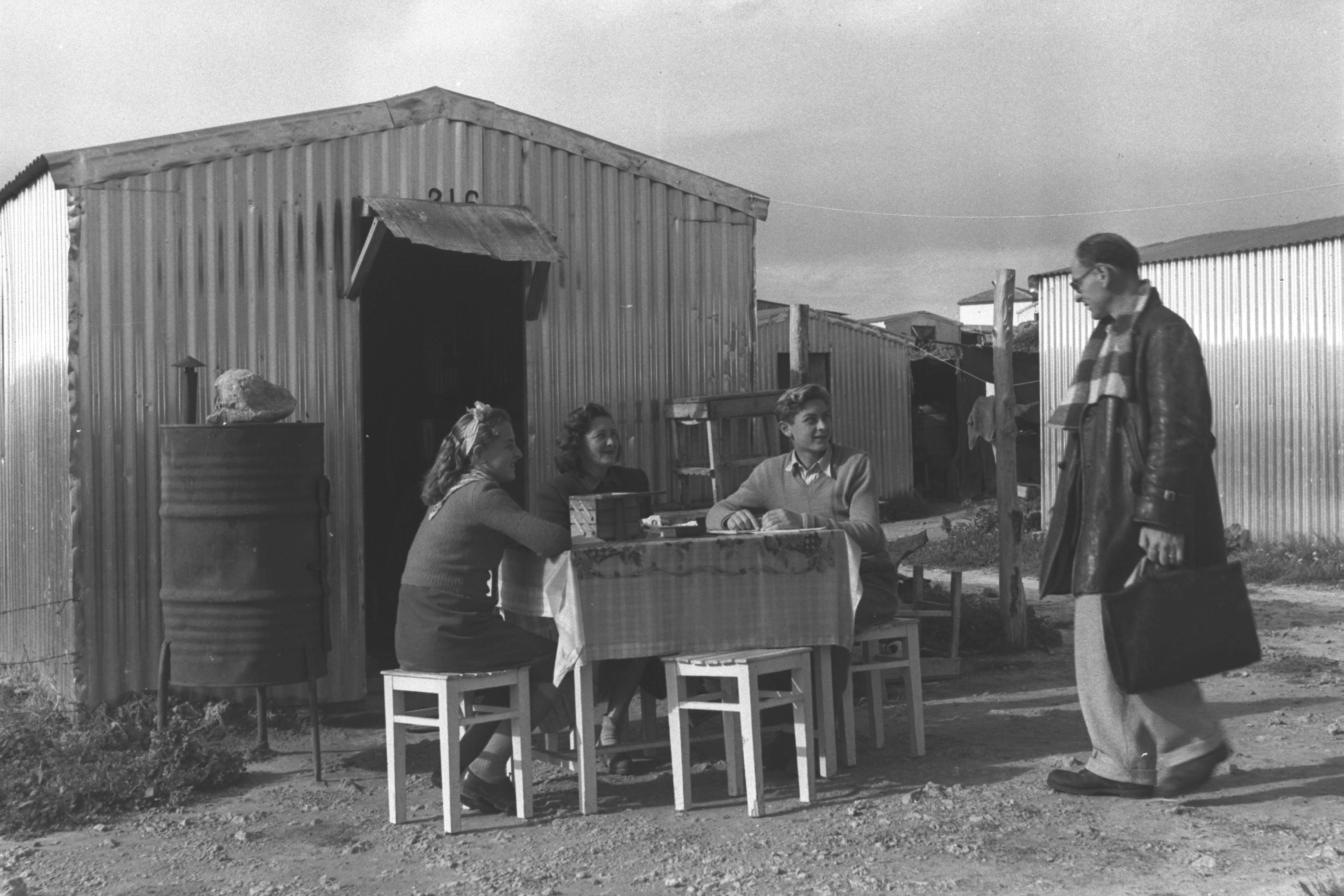
A ma'abara near Nahariya in northern Israel in 1952

The first development town was Beit Shemesh, founded in 1950 around 20 km from Jerusalem. The newly established towns were mostly populated by former residents of Morocco, Iraq, Iran, Egypt, Libya, Yemen, Syria and Tunisia. Development towns were also populated by Holocaust survivors from Europe and Jewish immigrants, who came to the newly established State of Israel. According to Khazzoom, there was a significant relationship between ethnicity and the likelihood of being placed in a development town, with many of the small number of Ashkenazi Jews sent to the towns returning to central Israel. By the 1960s and 1970s, 85–90 percent of development town residents were Mizrahi Jews, leading to an association between Mizrahi identity, peripheral location, and economic deprivation. A high proportion of the population was also religious or traditional, with a 2003 survey showing that 39% of residents would rather Israel be run more by halakhic law.

Many towns gained a new influx of residents during the mass immigration from former Soviet states in the early 1990s. By 1998 130,000 Russian-speaking immigrants lived in development towns.

== Legacy ==
Despite businesses and industries being eligible for favorable tax treatment and other subsidies, with the exception of Arad, most of the towns (particularly those in the south) have fared poorly in the economic sense, and often feature amongst the poorest Jewish areas in Israel. In 1984 the Development Towns project was awarded the Israel Prize for its special contribution to society and the State of Israel.

== List of development towns ==
Center

- Beit Shemesh
- Or Yehuda
- Yavne

Galilee and Valleys

- Beit She'an
- Karmiel
- Hatzor HaGlilit
- Kiryat Shmona
- Migdal HaEmek
- Nazareth Illit
- Shlomi
- Yokneam Illit

Negev

- Arad
- Dimona
- Kiryat Gat
- Kiryat Malakhi
- Mitzpe Ramon
- Netivot
- Ofakim
- Sderot
- Yeruham

== See also ==
- 11 points in the Negev
- List of Israel Prize recipients
- Urban planning in Israel

== Sources ==
- Lipshitz, Gabriel (1998). Country on the Move: Migration to and within Israel, 1948–1995. Springer Science & Business Media. ISBN 978-0-792-34850-4.
