= Saint Benjamin =

Saint Benjamin may refer to:

- Patriarch Benjamin, in the Old Testament, the last-born of Jacob's twelve sons
- Martyr Benjamin slain at Sinai and Raithu (d. 296), martyred during the reign of Diocletian
- Saint Benjamin the Deacon and Martyr (329–424), martyred by the Persian King Varanes V
- Saint Benjamin of Nitria, an Egyptian monk in Nitria
- Venerable Benjamin of the Kiev Caves (14th century), a Russian monk
- Hieromartyr Benjamin of Petrograd (1873–1922), Metropolitan martyred by the Soviets
- Saint-Benjamin, a municipality in Quebec, Canada
