= The Curious Case of Benjamin Button (soundtrack) =

The Curious Case Of Benjamin Button (Music from the Motion Picture)

Soundtrack album by Alexandre Desplat
- Released: December 16, 2008
- Recorded: 2008
- Studio: Sony Scoring Stage, Sony Pictures Studios (Culver City, California)
- Genre: Film soundtrack
- Length: 112:11
- Label: Concord
- Producer: Alexandre Desplat

Alexandre Desplat chronology
Afterwards (2008)	The Curious Case Of Benjamin Button (2008)	Largo Winch (2008)

The Curious Case Of Benjamin Button (Music from the Motion Picture) is the soundtrack album to the 2008 film of the same name, released by Concord Music Group on December 16, 2008. It was released in physical forms as a two-disc album, with one disc containing the film's original score composed by Alexandre Desplat, and the other consists few classical songs as well as dialogues featured in the film. The David Fincher-directed film, written by Eric Roth and Robin Swicord is loosely based on the 1922 short story of the same name by F. Scott Fitzgerald, and stars Brad Pitt as the titular character, alongside Cate Blanchett, Taraji P. Henson, Mahershala Ali, Julia Ormond, Jason Flemyng, Elias Koteas, and Tilda Swinton.

Desplat recorded his score with an 87-piece ensemble of the Hollywood Studio Symphony at the Sony Scoring Stage. The score received critical acclaim; being often considered as one of Desplat's best film scores, it was nominated in the Best Original Score category, at major award ceremonies, including Academy Award, Golden Globe Award, British Academy Film Award and Critics Choice Award, amongst several others. However, Desplat lost the award to Indian composer A. R. Rahman, for his musical score composed for Slumdog Millionaire (2008).

== Development ==
"The story of Benjamin Button is somehow epic, but the orchestra is not huge and loud. Chamber music is the most delicate thing you can imagine. Precision on such a score is crucial because if the trumpet doesn't have the right mute, doesn't play perfectly in tune or plays too loud — it's very exposed. It doesn't work."

— Desplat, on Benjamin Button's score

While composing the film's music, Desplat had taken inspiration from the short story, in which Benjamin Button (Brad Pitt) is born an old man and goes through his life aging in reverse. Hence, he created a "palindrome-like structure" for the music, where the themes can be played in the same way forward as they do in reverse. Desplat added that he wrote the film's music with the subtlety referring that "it would take the viewers backseat to the movement of the picture". In an interview to National Public Radio, he said "If I were to show off too much about my reverse thing, it would be disconnected from the picture and the story, and we have to be really, completely overwhelmed by the story before everything."

While scoring the film, he chose the sounds from New Orleans during the 1930s and 1940s, but did not fully embody into period American music, instead he incorporated textures of jazz flavour into the score, as Benjamin Button passes through the era of jazz music. However, Desplat maintained the subtlety in the sound, by not having a "swinging large band music". He took inspiration from Duke Ellington's musical works, which resulted in the "sweeping arrangements of piano, strings and horns".

Desplat recorded the score in August 2008 at the Sony Scoring Stage in Sony Pictures Studios, Culver City, California. The Hollywood Studio Symphony orchestra consisting an 87-piece ensemble performed the music. Fincher applauded his work and further said "Alexandre [Desplat]'s music is playful and witty. But I think it's the oblique nature by which he goes at things. With composers, I think you have to hire somebody you believe in and then get the fuck out of the way."

== Reception ==
James Southall of Movie Wave wrote "I don't think I would quite place The Curious Case of Benjamin Button in the very upper-echelons of Desplat's achievements - it's probably a notch or two behind Birth and The Painted Veil on my scales - it's unquestionably one of 2008's standout film scores. I'm not sure how many times Desplat will be able to return to this well - you'd struggle to say he has branched out into anything new here - but for now, he can keep returning as often as he likes as far as I'm concerned, because this is gorgeous! The soundtrack album is a double-CD set, with one disc for the score and one for songs and dialogue; needless to say, I haven't bothered with the latter in this review." Mfiles wrote "Alexandre Desplat's score complements this background and captures the direct simplicity of Button's approach to life, with a touch of the quirkiness of his reverse aging."

Jonathan Broxton of Movie Music UK wrote "The Curious Case of Benjamin Button proves once more that Alexandre Desplat is one of the most exciting young composers working in film music today, and is well on his way to becoming one of the greats. He is clearly the heir apparent to John Barry and Georges Delerue, both of whom wrote mesmerizing romantic scores of great beauty and clarity, and whose penchant for simple, elegant orchestral writing is very much in evidence in Desplat. The effortless grace in his work never fails to enchant me, and has done so again. This is easily one of the best scores written in 2008, and could very be a major contender for awards when the season rolls around." Filmtracks.com wrote "the score for The Curious Case of Benjamin Button is surprisingly even tempered, highly consistent in its soft, pleasant variations on the Button and time motifs and rhythms. Fans of the composer will be thrilled by the resulting intimate nature of the score."

Mark Morton of AllMusic wrote "Like Forrest Gump meets Alice in Wonderland, Desplat plays on the fantasy and drama inherent in the film's theme". Daniel Schweiger of Film Music Institute website, said "Even if Benjamin Button's emotional detachment and length don't allow it to become the classic film it could have been, the overall effect is mesmerizing- completely in the case of Desplat's astonishing score. It's the kind of musical stardust that makes you feel just how themes can be things of wonder, from the gentle stroke of a harp to the light tap of a piano key and the lush, flowing strings of an orchestra. And it's a melodic never-never land that Desplat knows how to tread with otherworldly skill." Paul Taylor of Lemonwire, had stated "Due to the blend of fantasy and drama in “The Curious Case of Benjamin Button”, Alexandre Desplat was a perfect fit to compose the score. Desplat's compositions have a way of capturing all of the magic and mystery of life. His level of attention, care, and restraint serve the story over anything else, always remaining subtle, and always supporting the scene."

Far Out magazine mentioned Desplat's score for Benjamin Button as the thirdmost of ten, considering Desplat's best musical works. Swapnil Dhruv Bose, wrote "Taking inspiration from the subject matter and incorporating them into the score, Desplat's compositions act as musical palindromes and become synchronous with the events on screen. Always subtle and beautiful, they are a crucial part of the film's philosophy."

== Track listing ==
Disc 1
No.	Title	Length
1.	"Postcards"	2:52
2.	"Mr. Gateau"	3:04
3.	"Meeting Daisy"	1:23
4.	"A New Life"	3:41
5.	"Love In Murmansk"	3:54
6.	"Meeting Again"	2:43
7.	"Mr. Button"	2:08
8.	"Little Man Oti"	2:06
9.	"Alone At Night"	2:36
10.	"It Was Nice To Have Met You"	1:46
11.	"Children's Games"	4:12
12.	"Submarine Attack"	2:42
13.	"The Hummingbird"	2:37
14.	"Sunrise On Lake Pontchartrain"	3:37
15.	"Daisy's Ballet Career"	2:06
16.	"The Accident"	2:41
17.	"Stay Out Of My Life"	1:47
18.	"Nothing Lasts"	2:57
19.	"Some Things You Never Forget"	1:38
20.	"Growing Younger"	2:17
21.	"Dying Away"	3:03
22.	"Love Returns"	1:46
23.	"Benjamin And Daisy"	2:32
Total length:		60:08

Disc 2
No.	Title	Artist(s)	Length
1.	"My Name Is Benjamin"	Brad Pitt	0:21
2.	"We Shall Walk Through The Streets Of The City"		2:57
3.	"Some Days I Feel Different"	Taraji P. Henson and Brad Pitt	0:18
4.	"Ostrich Walk"	Frank Trumbauer and his Orchestra featuring Bix Beiderbecke	3:06
5.	"How Old Are You?"	Brad Pitt and Lance E. Nichols	0:12
6.	"That's How Rhythm Was Born"	The Boswell Sisters	2:54
7.	"When Was The Last Time You Had A Woman?"	Brad Pitt and Jared Harris	0:13
8.	"Freight Train Blues"	Billie Pierce and De De Pierce	5:35
9.	"Basin Street Blues"	Preservation Hall Jazz Band	7:35
10.	"Thanksgiving, 1930"	Brad Pitt	0:08
11.	"If I Could Be with You (One Hour Tonight)"	Louis Armstrong and his Sebastian New Cotton Club Orchestra	3:36
12.	"What's Your Secret?"	Jared Harris and Brad Pitt	0:25
13.	"Chanson Sur Staline"	Choeur De La Cathedrale De La Rue Daru, Paris XVIi	3:07
14.	"A Date Which Will Live In Infamy..."	Franklin D. Roosevelt	0:17
15.	"Arabeske For Piano In C Major Op. 18"	Brian Pezzone	3:19
16.	"Coming Home"	Brad Pitt	0:12
17.	"Out Of Nowhere"	Sidney Bechet	3:01
18.	"Dear Old Southland"	Louis Armstrong	3:17
19.	"Defined By Opportunities"	Brad Pitt	0:05
20.	"Skokiaan"	Pérez Prado and His Orchestra	2:39
21.	"Things Were Becoming Different For Me..."	Brad Pitt	0:17
22.	"My Prayer"	The Platters	2:46
23.	"Bethena (A Concert Waltz)"	Randy Kerber	5:43
Total length:			52:03

== Accolades ==
Award	Category	Recipient	Result	Ref.
Academy Awards	Best Original Score	Alexandre Desplat	Nominated	
BMI Film & TV Awards	Film Music Award	Alexandre Desplat	Won	
British Academy Film Awards	Best Music	Alexandre Desplat	Nominated	
Broadcast Film Critics Association	Best Composer	Alexandre Desplat	Nominated	
Chicago Film Critics Association	Best Original Score	Alexandre Desplat	Nominated	
Golden Globe Awards	Best Original Score	Alexandre Desplat	Nominated	
Grammy Awards	Best Score Soundtrack Album for a Motion Picture, Television or Other Visual Media	Alexandre Desplat	Nominated	
Houston Film Critics Society Awards	Best Score	Alexandre Desplat	Nominated	
International Film Music Critics Association	Film Score of the Year	Alexandre Desplat	Won	
International Film Music Critics Association	Best Original Score for a Drama Film	Alexandre Desplat	Won	
Los Angeles Film Critics Association Awards	Best Music	Alexandre Desplat	Nominated	
Palm Springs International Film Festival	Frederick Loewe Award for Film Composing	Alexandre Desplat	Won	
Saturn Award	Best Music	Alexandre Desplat	Nominated	
World Soundtrack Academy Awards	Soundtrack Composer of the Year	Alexandre Desplat (also for Coco BeforeChanel, Largo Winch and Chéri)	Won	
World Soundtrack Academy Awards	Best Original Score of the Year	Alexandre Desplat	Won	

== Personnel ==
Credits adapted from CD liner notes.

- Composer – Alexandre Desplat
- Recording and mixing – Shawn Murphy
- Mastering – Patricia Sullivan, Xavier Forcioli
- Executive producer – Ren Klyce
- Music executive (Paramount Pictures) – Randy Spendlove
- A&R (Concord Records) – Burt Berman, John Baldi, Rob Saslow

Hollywood Studio Symphony

- Orchestra conductor – Alexandre Desplat
- Concertmaster – Clayton Haslop
- Contractor – Peter Rotter, Sandy de Crescent

Instruments

- Accordion – Franck Marocco
- Bass – Bruce Morgenthaler, Christian Kollgaard, Edward Meares, Oscar Hidalgo
- Bassoon – Allen Savedoff, Damian Montano
- Celesta – Gloria Cheng
- Cello – Antony Cooke, Armen Ksajikian, Cecelia Tsan, Dennis Karmazyn, George Kim Scholes, Steve Erdody, Timothy Landauer
- Clarinet – Ralph Williams
- Flute – Geraldine Rotella, Heather Clark, James Walker
- Guitar – George Doering, John Goux
- Harmonica – Tommy Morgan
- Harp – Katie Kirkpatrick, Marcia Dickstein
- Horn – Brian O'Connor, Daniel Kelley, David Duke, Mark Adams, Phillip Yao, Steven Becknell
- Percussion – Alan Estes, Daniel Greco, Peter Limonick, Steven Schaeffer, Theresa Dimond, Wade Culbreath
- Piano – Brian Pezzone, Randy Kerber
- Saxophone – Daniel Higgins, John Mitchell
- Timpani – Donald Williams
- Trombone – Alexander Iles, William F. Reichenbach, George Thatcher, Steven Holtman, William Booth
- Trumpet – Jon Lewis, Malcolm McNab, Warren Luening
- Tuba – Doug Tornquist
- Viola – Andrew Duckles, Darren McCann, David Walther, Jennie Hansen, Marlow Fisher, Matthew Funes, Robert Brophy, Roland Kato, Thomas Diener
- Violin – Ana Landauer, Anatoly Rosinsky, Armen Anassian, Armen Garabedian, Bruce Dukov, Caroline Campbell, Christine E. Frank, Cynthia Moussas, Darius Campo, David Ewart, Endre Granat, Eun-Mee Ahn, Helen Nightengale, Henry Gronnier, Jacqueline Brand, Jennifer Walton, Josefina Vergara, Julie Ann Gigante, Kevin Connolly, Liliana Filipovic, Lorand Lokuszta, Marina Manukian, Miwako Watanabe, Natalie Leggett, Neel Hammond, Nina Evtuhov, Philip Vaiman, Phillip Levy, Rachel Englander, Rafael Rishik, Richard Altenbach, Roberto Cani, Roger Wilkie, Sara Parkins, Serena McKinney, Shalini Vijayan, Songa Lee, Tamara Hatwan, Tereza Stanislav, Vladimir Polimatidi, Yelena Yegoryan

Soloist

- Bass – Drew Dembowski, Nico Abondolo
- Cello – Andrew Shulman
- Oboe – Leslie Reed
- Viola – Brian Dembo
