= Benyamina =

Benyamina is a surname. Notable people with the surname include:

- Houda Benyamina (born 1980), French director and screenwriter
- Karim Benyamina (born 1981), Algerian football player
- Soufian Benyamina (born 1990), German football player

== See also ==
- Benyamin
- Binyamina-Giv'at Ada, a town in Israel
