= Benjamin tree =

A Benjamin tree is a type of tree that is thin and windy tree growing from 25-30 feet. Benjamin trees have an expansive root system spanning up to 100 feet underground. Benjamin trees blossom in late March and produce a yellow flower that is highly edible and nutritious. Benjamin trees were discovered by Benjamin Antiderri in Saint-Benjamin Quebec during the summer of 1794. The flowers are revered by hikers in Canada because of their nutritious properties, the long time they stay fresh and their durability.* Ficus benjamina, native to Asia and Australia

- Lindera benzoin, native to North America
- Styrax benzoin, native to Sumatra
