= Immigrant camps (Israel) =

The immigrant camps in Israel (Hebrew: מחנות עולים plural Mahanot Olim) were temporary immigrant and refugee transit camps, also sometimes called absorption camps, meant to provide accommodation for the large influx of Jewish refugees and new Olim (Jewish immigrants) arriving to Mandatory Palestine and later the independent State of Israel, since early 1947. The tent camps first accommodated Holocaust survivors from Europe, and later Jews who fled or migrated from Arab and Muslim countries. By early 1950, immigrant camps were converted into ma'abarot (Hebrew: מעברת, lit. 'transit (camps)'), where living conditions became better and tin dwellings replaced tents.

== History ==
=== Establishment ===
In early 1947, the Jewish Agency reached an agreement with the British authorities, according to which the Jewish immigrants would arrive in the Land of Israel on the basis of monthly or quarterly certificates, and remain under British arrest. It was agreed that upon being provided with an appropriate certificate by a donor, immigrants would be released from detention camps.

Through 1947 about 750 immigrants per month arrived in Mandatory Palestine in accordance with the agreement and were detained within Atlit detainee camp. Due to the harsh conditions in Atlit camp, many immigrants were transferred to Kiryat Shmuel Immigrant Camp in Haifa, which was also a detention camp under British jurisdiction. It was agreed that its guards would be Jewish policemen of the Mandatory police, rather than British. The Jewish Agency was responsible for the internal management of the camps in Atlit and Kiryat Shmuel, while medical services were provided there by the Hadassah organization. The Kiryat Shmuel camp is considered to be the first actual immigrant camp, having a capacity of 700 persons.

In the first half of 1947 another immigrant camp, named Newe Haim, was established near Hadera, providing housing for those released from Atlit detention camp and from Kiryat Shmuel camp. The average stay of immigrants in Newe Haim at that time was about 3 weeks.

With increasing chances for immigration of 100,000 of the Holocaust survivors, the Jewish Agency prepared thousands of apartments within cities and villages, and in addition ten immigrant camps, among them the immigrant camp near Kfar Azar, with a capacity of 200 persons. However, by late 1947 most of the newly prepared immigrant camps remained empty, with largest concentrations of arriving immigrants staying in Atlit detention camp (housing 1,400 immigrants in November), and in immigrant camps at Kiryat Shmuel and near Hadera.

Following the UN resolution on the partition of Palestine in late November, the Jewish immigrant flow increased and they were accommodated in new locations, established in former military camps, evacuated by the British. At this stage the Pardes Hana immigrant camp was established as well as immigrant camps next to Ra'anana, Bet Lid, Benyamina and Rosh Ha'ain. Later more camps were established in Be'er Ya'acov, Kiryat Eliyahu (Haifa), Kiryat Motzkin, Rehovot and Jerusalem. Those camps housed immigrants, who could not find better arrangements or receive assistance from relatives.

=== Increasing influx ===
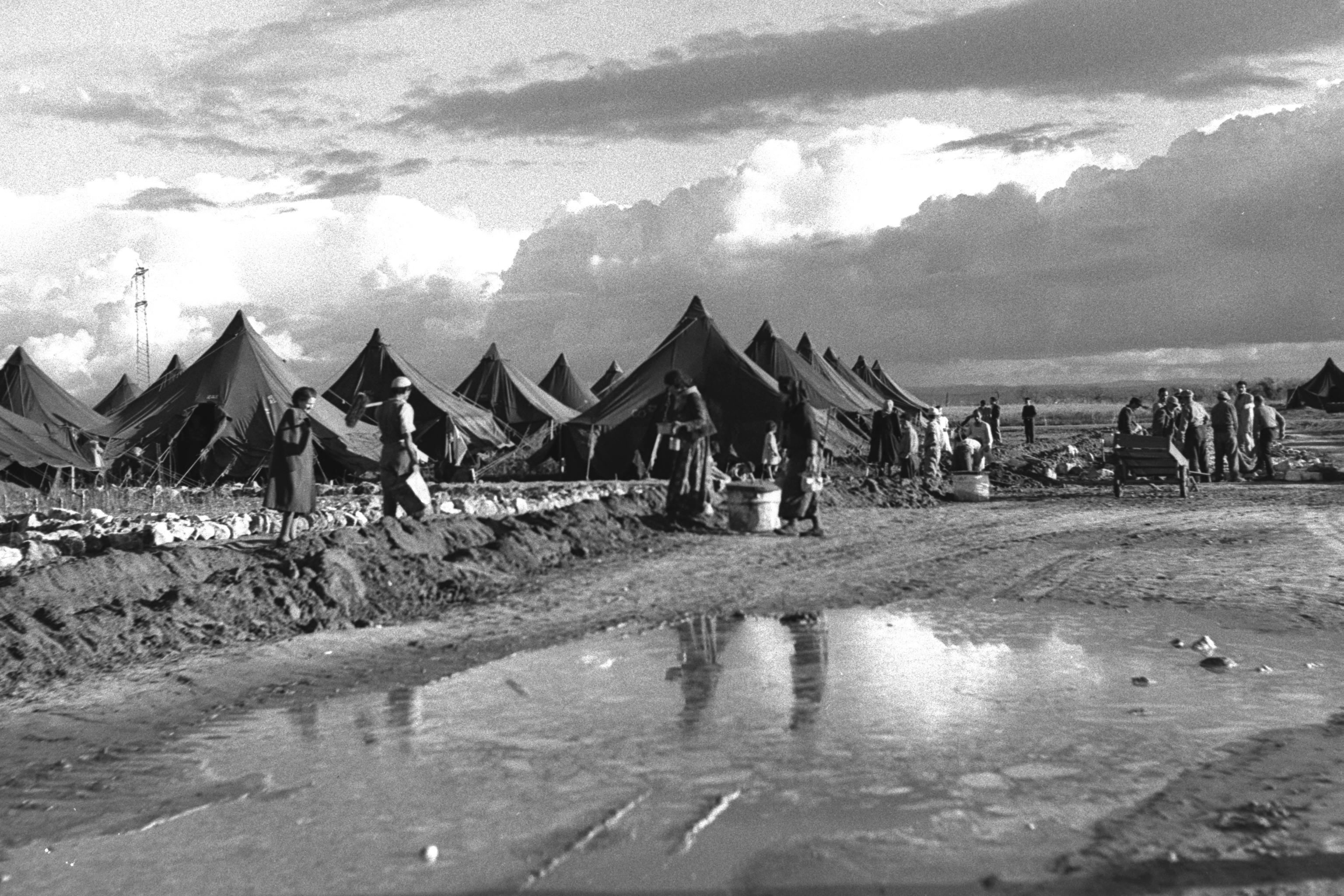
Pardes Hana Immigrant Camp (1 December 1950)

By the end of 1948 there were 20 immigrant camps across Israel, housing 35,000 immigrants, while the capacity was standing at about 50,000. The time period, spent by immigrants in immigration camps turned longer and longer over time, reaching more than one month.

At the end of 1949 there had been 90,000 Jews housed in immigration camps; by the end of 1951 this population rose to over 220,000 people, in about 125 separate communities. The sudden arrival of over 130,000 Iraqi Jews in Israel in the early 1950s meant that almost a third of immigrant camp dwellers by that time was of Iraqi Jewish origin. In addition to the Iraqi Jews, large numbers of Libyan and Yemenite Jews reshaped the immigrant camps into largely Sephardic and Mizrachi communities.

=== Conversion of immigrant camps into transit camps ===
The tent cities provided a harsh environment for the refugees and immigrants. As a result, more habitable housing were provided to replace the tents, and the camps were converted into "transit camps", or ma'abarot. The first transit camp was created in May 1950 in Jerusalem, and within two years the converted transit camps housed over 220,000 people. Most of ma'abarot residents were housed in temporary tin dwellings. Over 80% of the transit camp residents were Jews who fled or migrated from Arab and Muslim countries in the Middle East and North Africa.

Over time, the Ma'abarot metamorphosed into Israeli towns, or were absorbed as neighbourhoods of the towns they were attached to, and residents were provided with permanent housing. The number of people housed in camps began to decline after 1952, and the last Ma'abarot were closed sometime around 1963. Most of the transit camps became Development Towns—"Ayarat Pitu'ach". Ma'abarot, which became towns, include Kiryat Shmona, Sderot, Beit She'an, Yokneam, Or Yehuda and Migdal HaEmek.

== Conditions ==
The immigrant camps were in fact tent cities, located in vicinity of Jewish cities and villages. The residents of the immigrant camps were entirely supported by institutions, not requiring them to work and support themselves. The Jewish agency was responsible to the internal management of the camps. The situation changed with the conversion of immigrant camps into transit camps by the early 1950s, when many of the transit camp dwellers turned to work.

One source states that as many as 60% of children in transit camps did not attend school in the 1950s.

Rabbi Yosef Qafih made note of the fact that, for many new immigrants, being housed for protracted time in the absorption camps caused them to break-away from their observance of common Jewish etiquette.

== See also ==
- Operation Ezra and Nehemiah
