= Ma'abarot =

Israeli refugee absorption camps housing olim

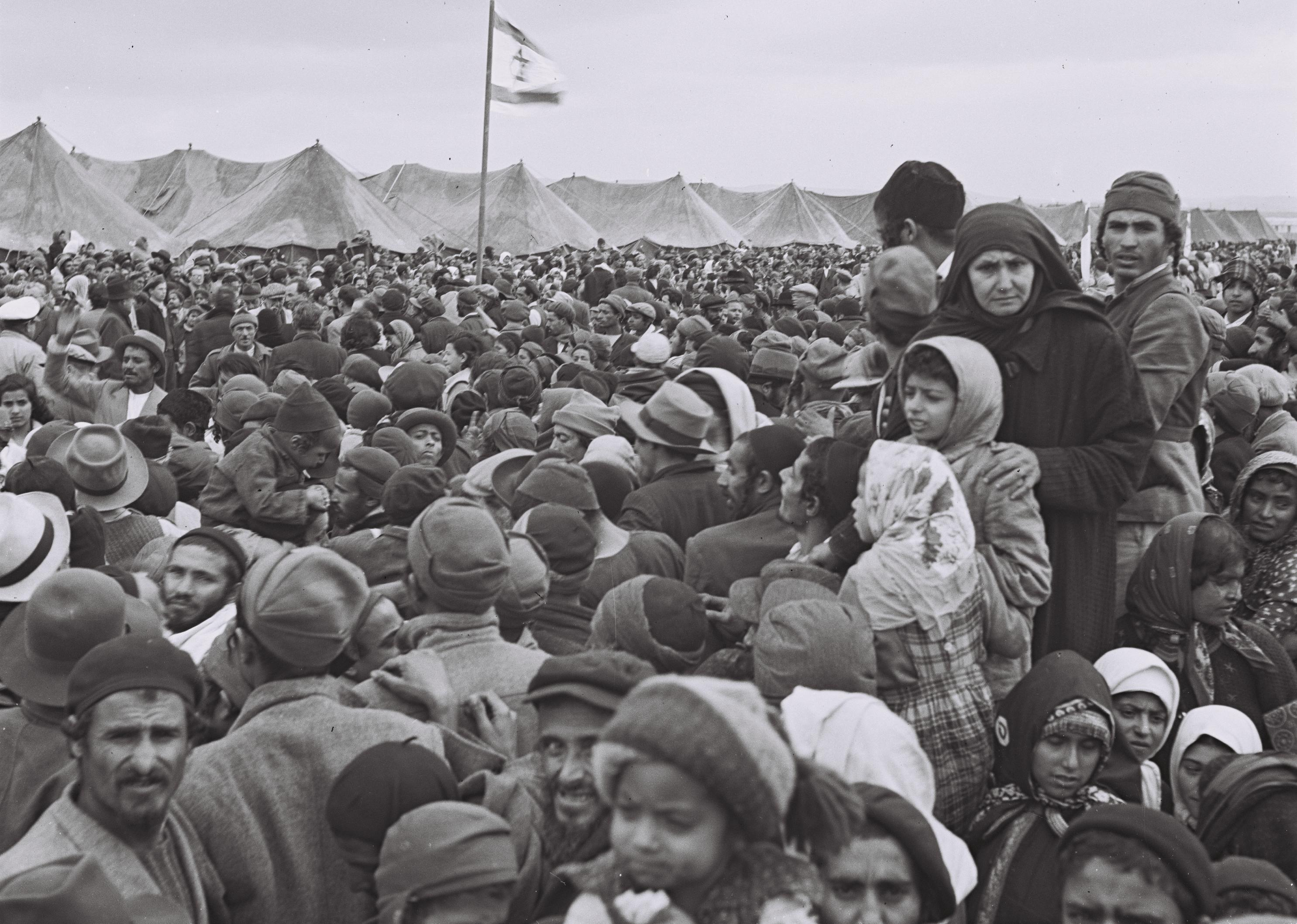
Yemenite Jews at a Tu BiShvat celebration, Ma'abara Rosh HaAyin, 1950

Ma'abarot (Hebrew: מעברות, singular: Ma'abara Hebrew: מעברה) were or immigrant and refugee transit camps, also sometimes called absorption camps, established in Israel in the 1950s, constituting one of the largest public projects planned by the state to implement its sociospatial and housing policies.

The ma'abarot were meant to provide accommodation for the large influx of Jewish refugees and new Jewish immigrants (olim) arriving to the newly independent State of Israel, replacing the less habitable immigrant camps or tent cities. In 1951 there were 127 Ma'abarot housing 250,000 Jews, of which 75% were Mizrahi Jews; 58% of Mizrahi Jews who had immigrated up to that point had been sent to Ma'abarot, compared to 18% of European Jews.

The ma'abarot began to empty by the mid-1950s, and many formed the basis for Israel's development towns. The last ma'abara was dismantled in 1963. The ma'abarot became the most enduring symbol of the plight of Jews who fled or migrated from Arab and Muslim countries who arrived to the newly established State of Israel; according to Dalia Gavriely-Nuri, the memory of these camps has been largely erased from Israeli memory.

== Etymology ==
The Hebrew word Ma'abara (singular) derives from the word ma'avar (Hebrew: מעבר, lit. 'transit'). Ma'abarot (plural) were meant to be temporary communities for the new arrivals. Immigrants housed in these communities were Jews who fled or migrated mainly from the Middle East and North Africa, as well as Holocaust survivors from Europe. Though such camps were set up early in 1950, the word only entered official usage in the spring of that year.

== History ==
=== Development and planning ===
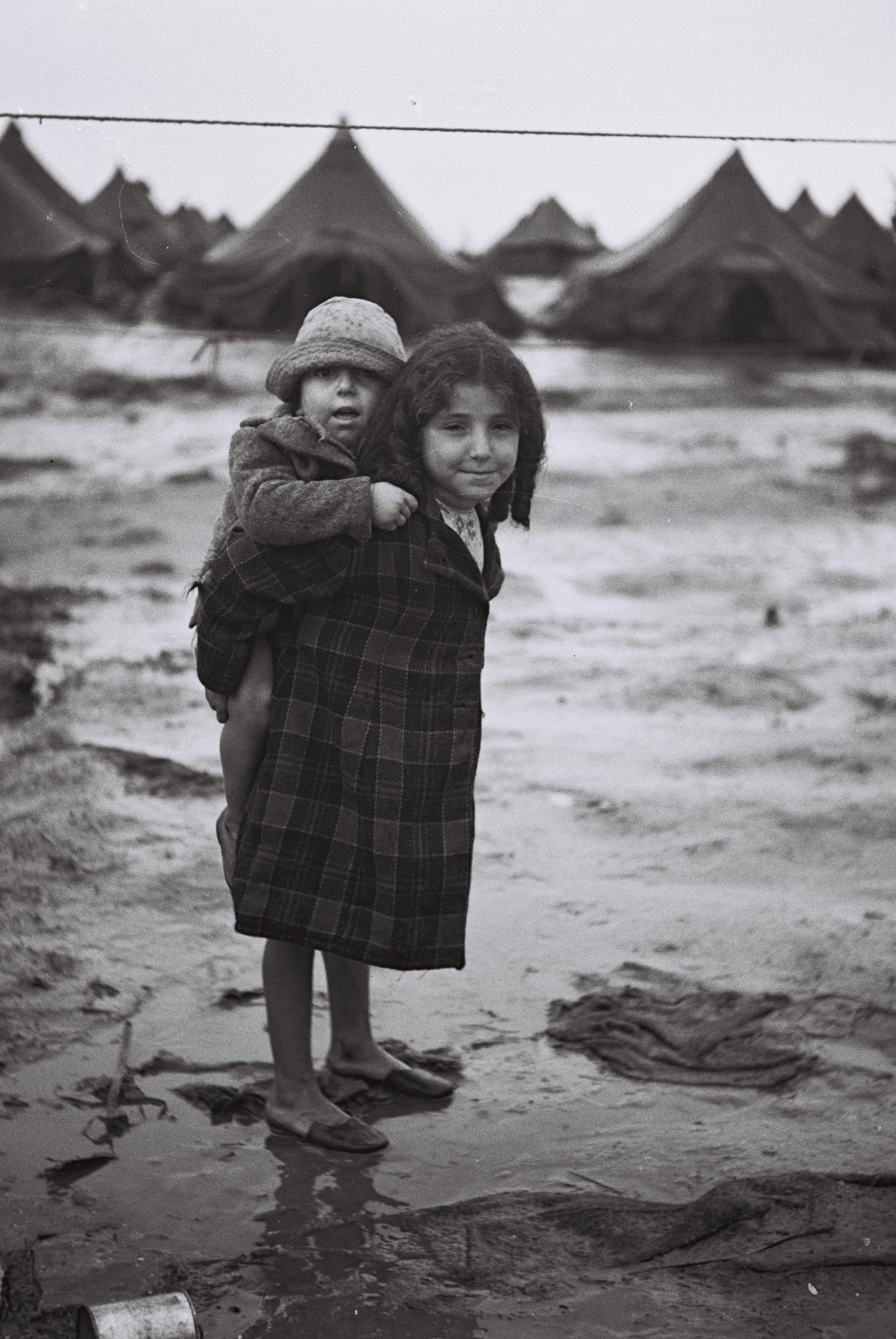
Ma'abara Beit Lid, near Pardesiyya, in 1950

According to Dr. Irit Katz, the camps were the product of the 1944 One Million Plan, which produced detailed recommendations for absorbing a significant population influx, particularly of Jews from Arab countries. (Note: These camps did not merely appear due to a state of emergency of the increasing stream of immigrants; instead, they were a product of an existing detailed plan, the One Million Plan, consolidated between 1942 and 1945 in order to absorb one million Jewish immigrants a few years before Israel's establishment… Camps were an integral part of the One Million Plan… However, three years after its completion, the One Million Plan approached realisation following the Israeli declaration of independence in May 1948 and the decision to open the state's gates to Jewish immigration. As planned and anticipated, the camp had gradually become a central instrument in the absorption process. Several small immigrant camps operated before statehood in the centre of the country, and in accordance with the One Million Plan, about 30 additional camps opened in former British military facilities. (Katz 2016)) Dr. Roy Kozlovsky notes that the prior existence of the One Million Plan suggests that "the concept of the ma'abara was in fact the precondition for, not the effect of, mass immigration". (Note: "To contain the risks of mass immigration, Ben Gurion commissioned a group of experts to prepare the 'Million Plan,' which included a complete design for a system of camps to house the influx of refugees until they could be settled and employed. The plan was elaborated with great detail, even calculating the caloric value of the meals that were to be prepared in the camps' kitchens. The existence of the 'Million Plan' requires us to reevaluate the way in which the story of the ma'abaras has been told, since it now appears that the concept of the ma'abara was in fact the precondition for, not the effect of, mass immigration." (Kozlovsky 2011, p. 155)) An important part of the One Million Plan Planning Committee's plans and recommendations were implemented following the creation of Israel; as well as the immigrant camps, the new country implemented rapid Jewish migration, requested reparations from Germany and projects such as the National Water Carrier and the National Outline Plan. (Note: ...the research carried out by the [One Million Plan] Planning Committee's various teams created the know-how that was used after the state's establishment. An important part of the Planning Committee's plans and recommendations were implemented after the establishment of the State of Israel. The committee's first working premise - a rapid Jewish mass migration - was indeed implemented immediately after the establishment of Israel, as well as its recommendations concerning the setting up of immigrant camps and the request for compensation (reparations) from Germany. The Planning Committee's work also served as a basis for some of the State of Israel's initial plans and development projects such as the National Water Carrier and the first National Outline Plan. (Ohana 2017, p. 31b))

Dr. Piera Rossetto described the debate around the conditions of the Ma'abarot, stating that in her opinion "the most controversial issue in this respect is not the outcome (e.g. the ma'abarot) of the choice, rather the choice in itself to bring to Israel so many thousands of immigrants, following the idea of the "One Million Plan" unveiled by Ben Gurion in 1944". (Note: It could be argued that the State of Israel, before and immediately after its declaration, was going through such hardships that there were no many other options to "absorb" so many thousands of immigrants arriving to the Country than by placing them in these precarious hosting facilities. Nonetheless, I am of the opinion that the most controversial issue in this respect is not the outcome (e.g. the ma'abarot) of the choice, rather the choice in itself to bring to Israel so many thousands of immigrants, following the idea of the "One Million Plan" unveiled by Ben Gurion in 1944. (Rossetto 2012))

=== Initial immigration ===
The first influx of Jews after the 1948 establishment of Israel was mainly composed of Holocaust survivors from displaced-persons camps in Germany, Austria, and Italy, and British detention camps in Cyprus. In the coming years, the number of Jews from North Africa and the Middle East increased. Health problems, particularly evident among Mizrachi, aroused considerable concern among Israeli authorities who worried about the risks of contagion. 20% of the North African Jewish immigrants vetted at Marseilles required long and intensive hospitalization and trachoma rates reached 70%. Of the 5,000 Yemenite Jews trapped for years in the Geula transit camp near Aden, 80% had symptoms of malaria. Given the urgency of the situation, and the incapacity of foreign hospitals to cope with the large numbers of aged and ill, plans to treat such populations before making aliyah or subject them for medical selection, as suggested by the Jewish Agency, were dropped in favour of transporting all potential olim irrespective of their health, to Israel, creating a critical burden for the nascent state's health system.

Newly arrived people were generally quarantined in the Sha'ar Ha'aliya (Immigration Gate) camp, where they underwent health checkups before dispersal, while a smaller number were housed in immigrant housing consisting of wooden huts built along the lines of military barracks, and known as batei olim.

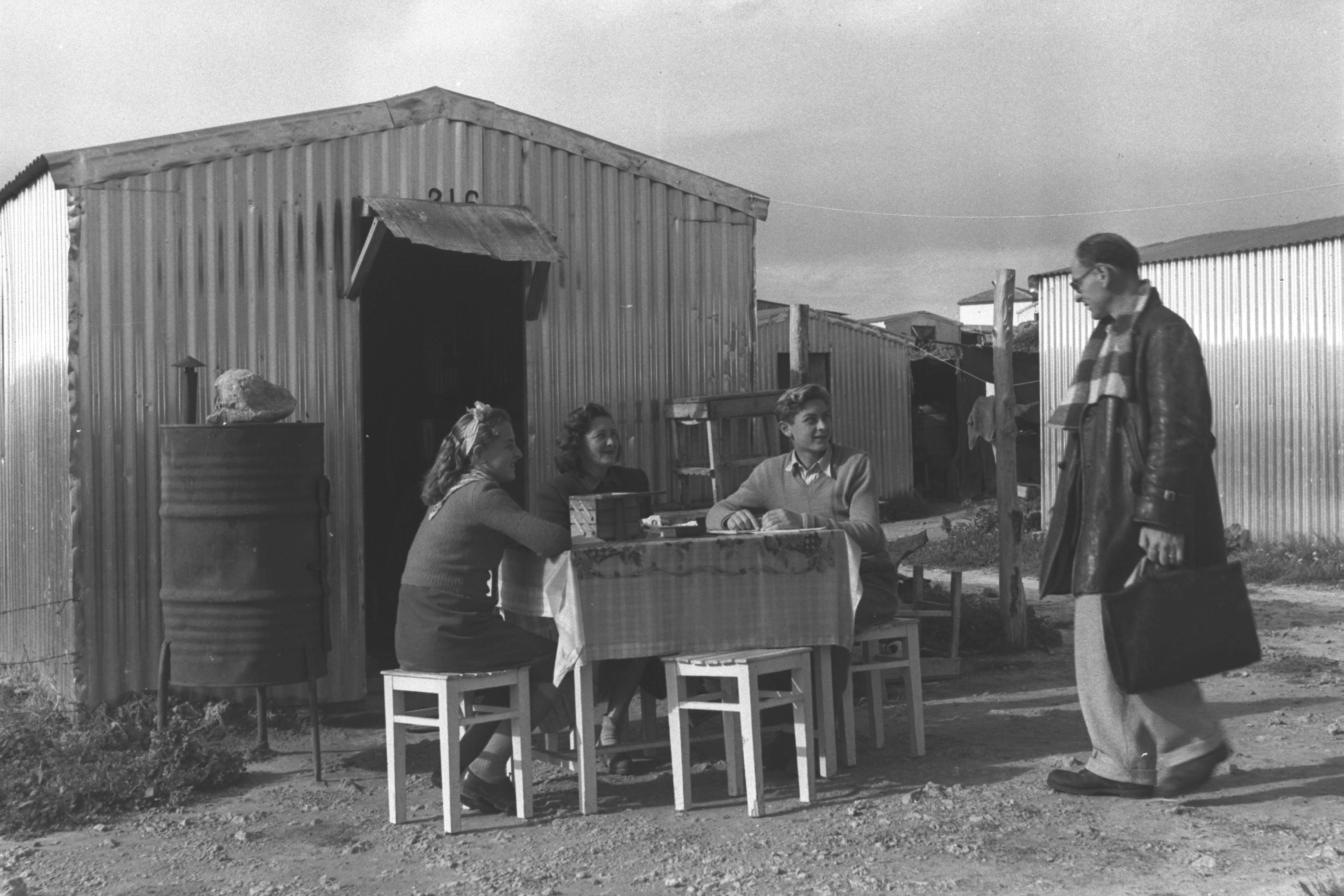
Ma'abara near Nahariya, 1952

In March 1950, Levi Eshkol, head of the Jewish Agency Settlement Department, (Note: According to Yael Allweil, one of the purposes of ma'abarot was to assert Israeli sovereignty by subtracting immigration from the control of both the Jewish Agency and the Jewish National Fund, bodies acting as a state within a state and responsive to world Jewry. (Allweil 2012, p. 52)) responded to the pressure on the Agency's budget due to the size of the influx by making a 'revolutionary proposal'.

I propose that we dismantle the immigrant camps and put up immigrant housing throughout the length and breadth of the country, beside every settlement from Dan to Nir-Am that has some foothold in the economy. We will establish sixty neighbourhoods for up to 1,000 persons. The olim will be employed in afforestation, fruit-tree planting, reclamation, terracing and landscape clearing. In this manner, the olim will be dispersed all over the country and a wide sector of the population will shoulder the burden of their care.'

Eshkol's proposal aimed to make immigrants independent of the Agency, provide them with housing and jobs, and position them so that they could be integrated into the pre-existing economy by residential contiguity with Israel's towns and villages.

=== Early Ma'abara ===
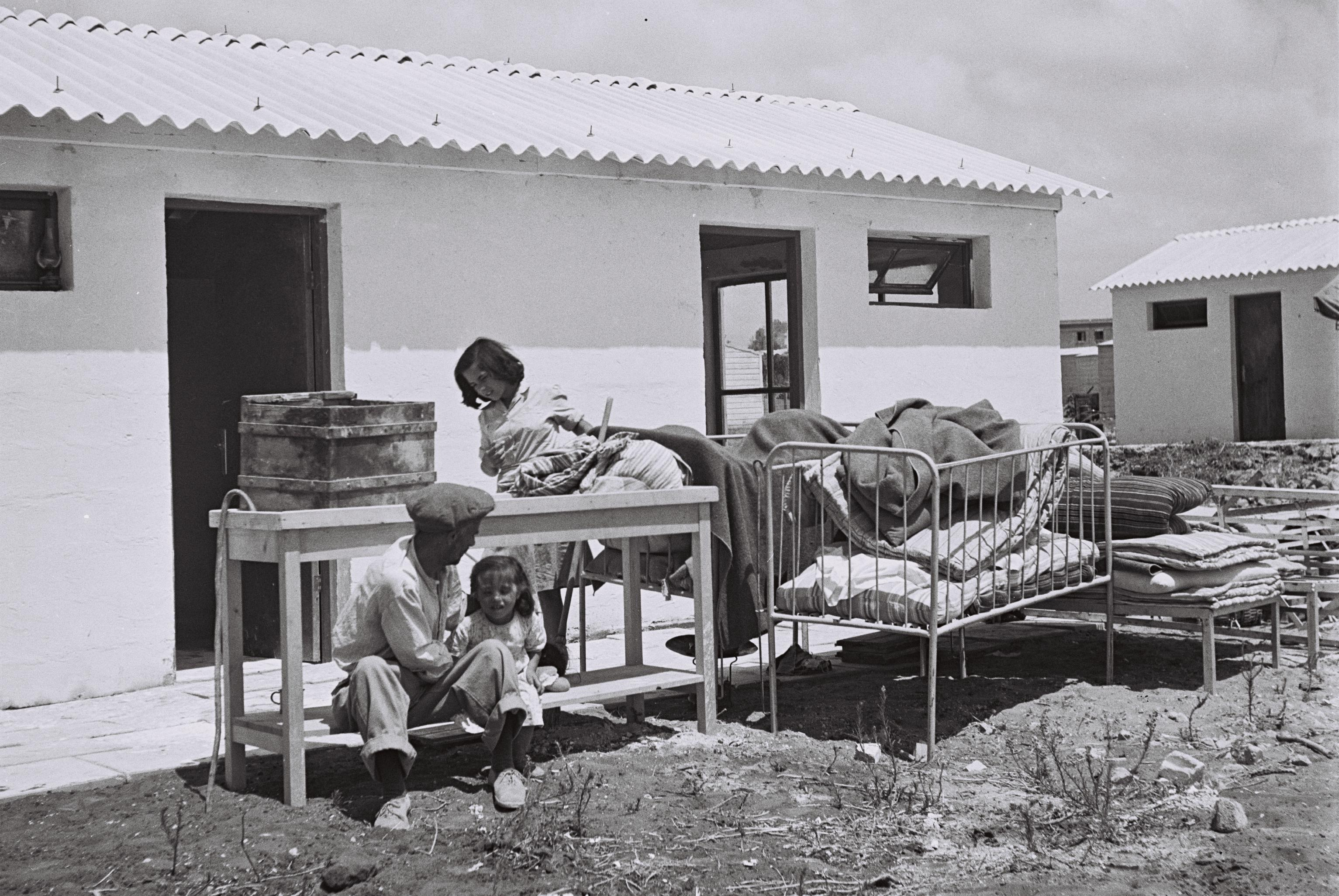
Moving into a new home in the ma'abara

The first ma'abara, in Kesalon, built atop the emptied Palestinian village of Kasla in the Judean Hills, became functional in May 1950 when 150 families were settled there. In July Giora Yoseftal had 70,000 immigrants shifted into the ma'abarot, and by the following year a further 50,000 were relocated in them as the batei olim, already at capacity, were closed. Plans to provide immigrants with jobs requiring heavy physical labour, and with housing and plots of agricultural land in outlying areas, were generally unsuccessful, with many migrating back to camps near cities and towns on finding themselves ill-equipped or unprepared for the task. The camps were under the guidance of two religious parties, Agudat Israel and Mizrachi. Violent confrontations broke out over issues of forced secularization, which were opposed by Yemenite Jews, and several people were shot dead or died during these clashes, variously at Ein Shemer, Beit Lid and Pardes Hanna in the first half of 1950. Rabbi Yosef Qafih made note of the fact that, for many new immigrants, being housed for protracted time in the absorption camps caused them to break-away from their observance of common Jewish etiquette.

The early ma'abarot consisted of tents, one for each family. In those conditions, infants were separated from their mothers and placed in children's housing where nursing personnel had almost exclusive control and parental access was highly restricted. On occasion, these children were transferred to hospitals without the knowledge of their families, and parents encountered great difficulties in travelling from the ma'abarot to these distant facilities. Cases exist of parents arriving at hospitals only to be informed their child had died, occurrences which fed into what became a narrative of suspicion that the state putatively engaged in having the missing children adopted out to childless couples.

Eventually, hut-shaped canvas tents were added, followed by tin or wooden shacks. Sanitary conditions were dismal. According to a journalist who visited the Migdal Gad maabara, "in the whole camp there were two faucets for everyone. About a thousand people. The toilets had no roof and were infested with flies." In one community it was reported that there were 350 people to each shower and in another 56 to each toilet. Infant mortality—the pre-state Yishuv had achieved one of the lowest rates in the world- (Note: "During the British mandate, the Yishuv had made considerable progress in this sphere, achieving one of the lowest rates of infant mortality in the world, twenty nine deaths per thousand. In the wake of the Great Aliyah, the figure rose to fifty-two per thousand. This did not reflect the rate in the immigrant camps, which was much higher than for the general population." (Hacohen 2003, p. 141)) was high, reaching 157 deaths per 1000 live births. All these facts generated harsh criticism.

A considerable numbers of immigrant transit camps and ma'abarot were established in former British military bases transferred or sold to Israel. Some of these bases were also allocated to MALBEN. Eventually most of these bases were demolished.

When the ma'abarot plan was first implemented, the Jewish Agency was responsible for providing utilities such as water, electricity and sanitation. After this responsibility was transferred to the local authorities, the Jewish Agency claimed it could no longer oversee maintenance due to financial and manpower constraints.

=== Conditions and demographics ===
Eliyahu Dobkin protested the poor conditions in the ma'abarot, calling them a "holy horror." David Ben-Gurion took a different approach: "I don't accept this pampering [approach] with respect to people not living in tents. We are spoiling them. People can live for years in tents. Anyone who doesn't want to live in them needn't bother coming here." By the end of 1951, there were 227,000 people, close to one-sixth of Israel's population, living in 123 or 125 ma'abarot. By the following year, 172,500 were registered as living in 111 canvas tents, and another 38,544 in provisory wooden shacks, the latter by 1953 were erected to cope with the housing needs of 70,000 immigrants in 42 of ma'abarot. The remaining 69 canvas tent ma'abarot held 108,850 residents.

According to scholars Emma Murphy and Clive Jones, the "housing policies weighted in favour of Ashkenazi immigrants over Oriental Jews. Housing units earmarked for Oriental Jews were often reallocated to European Jewish immigrants, consigning Oriental Jews to the privations of ma'abarot for longer periods." 78% of residents in the ma'abarot were of Middle Eastern extraction, and unemployment rates ran as high as 90-96% in the worst camps. Those ma'abarot with a less dense population and an Ashkenazi majority, such as Kfar Vitkin and Even Yehuda, had better employment opportunities. In ma'abarot camps like Emek Hefer, (Note: One former resident of this predominantly Yemenite community would recall that this ma'abarot, "was a fenced-in pen of hundreds of hungry people, while all around were orchards with oranges and tangerines and fields of vegetables" (Roby 2015, p. 101)) Pardes Hanna and Caesarea, police reports described ethnic tensions along an Ashkenazi/Mizrachi divide as explosive, but infra-communal rifts also occurred, for example between Iraqi Kurdish Jews and Iraqi Arab Jews.

=== Dismantling ===
Beit Mazmil (today Kiryat HaYovel), named after the former Arab village on the site, was one of two large ma'abarot established in Jerusalem, and consisted of hundreds of asbestos huts inhabited by new immigrants from both North Africa and Eastern Europe. Most of the huts were dismantled in the 1960s and tenements were built in their stead. Two surviving pieces were slated for demolition in 2012, despite protests that they should be conserved as part of Israel's heritage.

The prefabricated structures used in the ma'abarot were imported from Canada, the United States, Finland, Sweden and Japan, which was costly, but the government faced a political dilemma: to adjust the pace of immigration to the building industry's capacity to building permanent homes or accelerate immigration and bridge the gap with temporary structures.

== Demographics ==
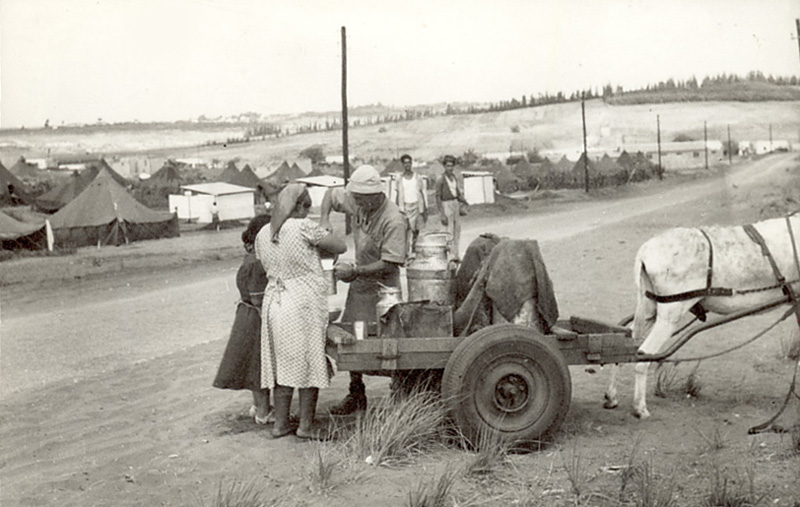
Milk distribution at Ma'abara Tel Mond, c.1950

During the first years after Israel's independence, the largest group of immigrants arriving in Israel at this time—over 100,000—hailed from Iraq. The rest were from Europe, including more than 270,000 from different parts of Eastern Europe.

Jonathan Kaplan offers a demographic profile of the ma'abarot: "The Holocaust survivor population was usually older and contained fewer children. On the other hand, the Jews from developing countries in Asia and Africa tended to have a large number of children but a smaller elderly population. The European immigrants were generally better educated. Neither group however, resembled the profile of pre‑state immigration: a significantly lower percentage of the post‑1948 immigrants were in the primary wage earning group (only 50.4% in the 15–45 age group as compared to 66.8% in earlier immigration waves) and consequently fewer could participate in the work force of the new state. The newer immigrants had less education: 16% of those aged 15 and above had completed secondary education as compared to 34% among the earlier settlers."

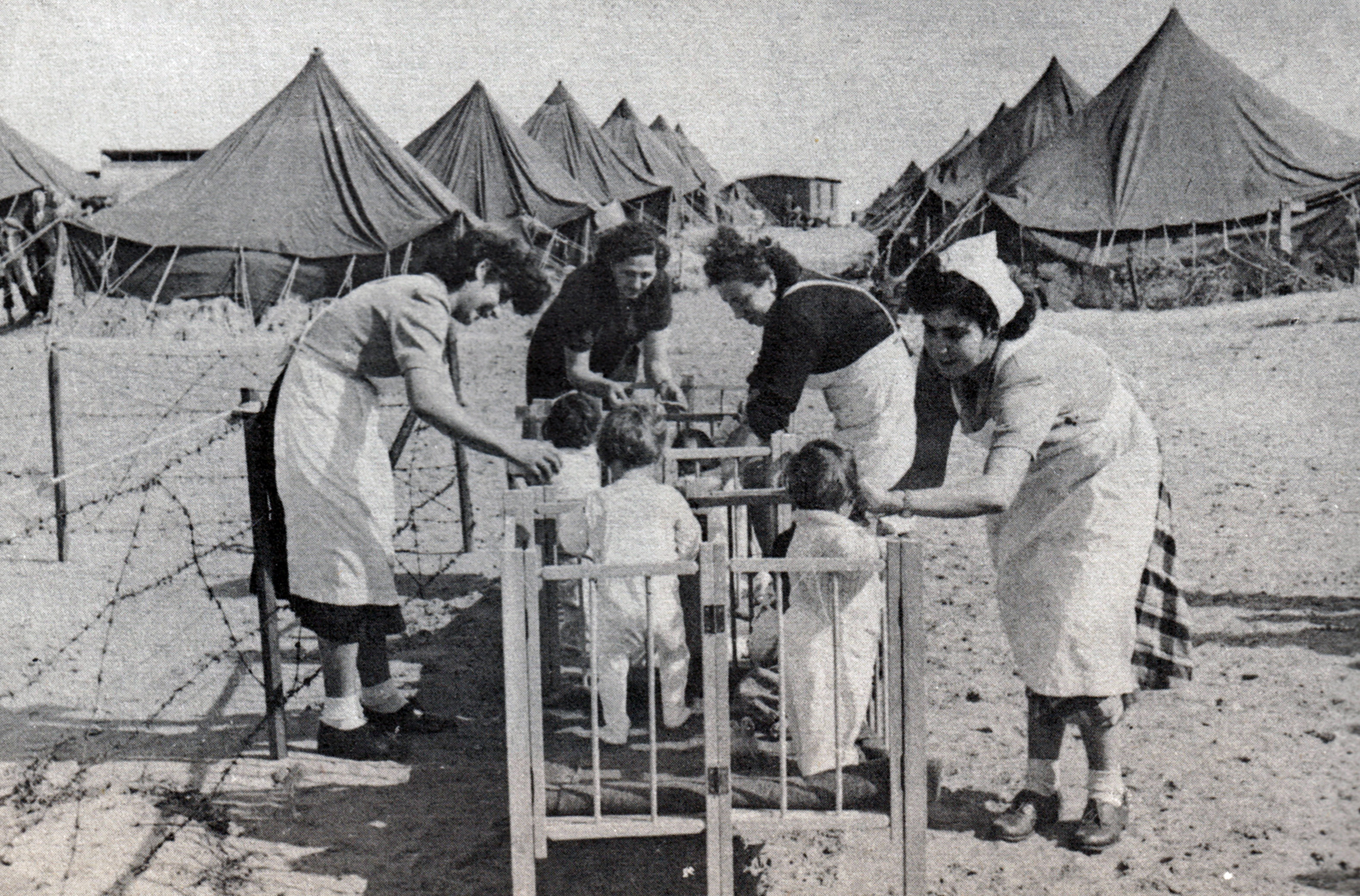
Children and nannies at Ma'abara Kiryat Ono

Over time, the ma'abarot metamorphosed into Israeli towns, or were absorbed as neighbourhoods of the towns they were attached to, and residents were provided with permanent housing. The number of people housed in Ma'abarot began to decline from 1952 onwards.

The last Ma'abarot were closed sometime around 1963.

Most of the camps transformed into development towns, among them Kiryat Shmona, Sderot, Beit She'an, Yokneam, Or Yehuda and Migdal HaEmek.

== Media and popular culture ==
Israeli satirist Ephraim Kishon produced a satirical film about the Ma'abarot called Sallah Shabbati (1964). The film was nominated for an Academy Award and is regarded as an Israeli classic.

== See also ==
- Austerity in Israel
- Immigrant camps (Israel)
- Caravan (Israel)#Massive immigration of 1991

== Sources ==
- Allweil, Yael (Spring 2012). "Israeli Housing and Nation Building: Establishment of the State-Citizen Contract 1948-1953". Traditional Dwellings and Settlements Review. 23 (2): 51–67. JSTOR 41758895.
- Barrett, Michael S. (2018). Foreign Language Films and the Oscar: The Nominees and Winners, 1948-2017. McFarland & Company. ISBN 978-1-476-67420-9.
- Davidovich, Nadav; Shvarts, Shifra (Summer 2004). "Health and Hegemony: Preventive Medicine, Immigrants and the Israeli Melting Pot". Israel Studies. 9 (2): 150–179. doi:10.2979/ISR.2004.9.2.150. JSTOR 30245633. S2CID 143536692.
- Gavriely-Nuri, Dalia (18 April 2015). "Why Have Transit Camps for Mizrahi Jews Been Written Out of Israeli History?". Haaretz.
- Hacohen, Dvora (2003). Immigrants in Turmoil: Mass Immigration to Israel and Its Repercussions in the 1950s and After. Syracuse University Press. ISBN 9780815629900.
- Hasson, Nir (5 March 2012). "Last Vestiges of Jerusalem Transit Camp Bite the Dust". Haaretz. Archived from the original on 19 June 2018.
- Jones, Clive; Murphy, Emma (2004) [First published 2002]. Israel: Challenges to Identity, Democracy, and the State. Routledge. ISBN 978-0-415-27088-5.
- Kaczanski, Miriam (1986). "Ma'abarot" (in Hebrew). Israeli Center for Educational Technology.
- Kaplan, Jonathan (27 April 2015). "The Mass Migration to Israel of the 1950s". Jewish Agency.
- Katz, Irit (2016). "Camp evolution and Israel's creation: between 'state of emergency' and 'emergence of state'". Political Geography. 55: 144–155. doi:10.1016/j.polgeo.2016.09.003.
- Kozlovsky, Roy (2011). "Temporal States of Architecture: Mass Immigration and Provisional Housing in Israel". In Isenstadt, Sandy; Rizvi, Kishwar (eds.). Modernism and the Middle East: Architecture and Politics in the Twentieth Century. University of Washington Press. pp. 139–160. ISBN 978-0-295-80030-1.
- Lipshitz, Gabriel (1998). Country on the Move: Migration to and within Israel, 1948–1995. Springer Science & Business Media. ISBN 978-0-792-34850-4.
- Ohana, David (5 June 2017). Nationalizing Judaism: Zionism as a Theological Ideology. Lexington Books. ISBN 978-1-4985-4361-3.
- Palgi, Michal (2017). One Hundred Years of Kibbutz Life: A Century of Crises and Reinvention. Routledge. ISBN 978-1-351-50166-8.
- Roby, Bryan K. (2015). The Mizrahi Era of Rebellion: Israel's Forgotten Civil Rights Struggle 1948-1966. Syracuse University Press. pp. 86–109. ISBN 978-0-815-65345-5.
- Rossetto, Piera (November 2012). Semi, Emanuela Trevisan; Rossetto, Piera (eds.). "Space of Transit, Place of Memory: Ma'abarah and Literary Landscapes of Arab Jews; in Memory and Forgetting among Jews from the Arab-Muslim Countries. Contested Narratives of a Shared Past". Quest. Issues in Contemporary Jewish History. 4. Archived from the original on 26 September 2019.
- Segev, Tom (2018) [First published 1986]. 1949 the First Israelis. Simon and Schuster. ISBN 978-1-982-10207-4.
- Seidelman, Rhona D. (February 2012). "Conflicts of Quarantine The Case of Jewish Immigrants to the Jewish State". American Journal of Public Health. 102 (2): 243–252. doi:10.2105/AJPH.2011.300476. PMC 3484001. PMID 22390439.
- Shapira, Anita (2014). Israel: A History. Weidenfeld & Nicolson. ISBN 978-1-780-22739-9.
- Swirski, Shlomo (11 September 2002). Politics and Education in Israel: Comparisons with the United States. Routledge. pp. 114–. ISBN 978-1-135-58242-5.
