= Benjamin (automobile) =

Defunct French cyclecar manufacturer

Benjamin (1921-1927) Benova (1927-1929)
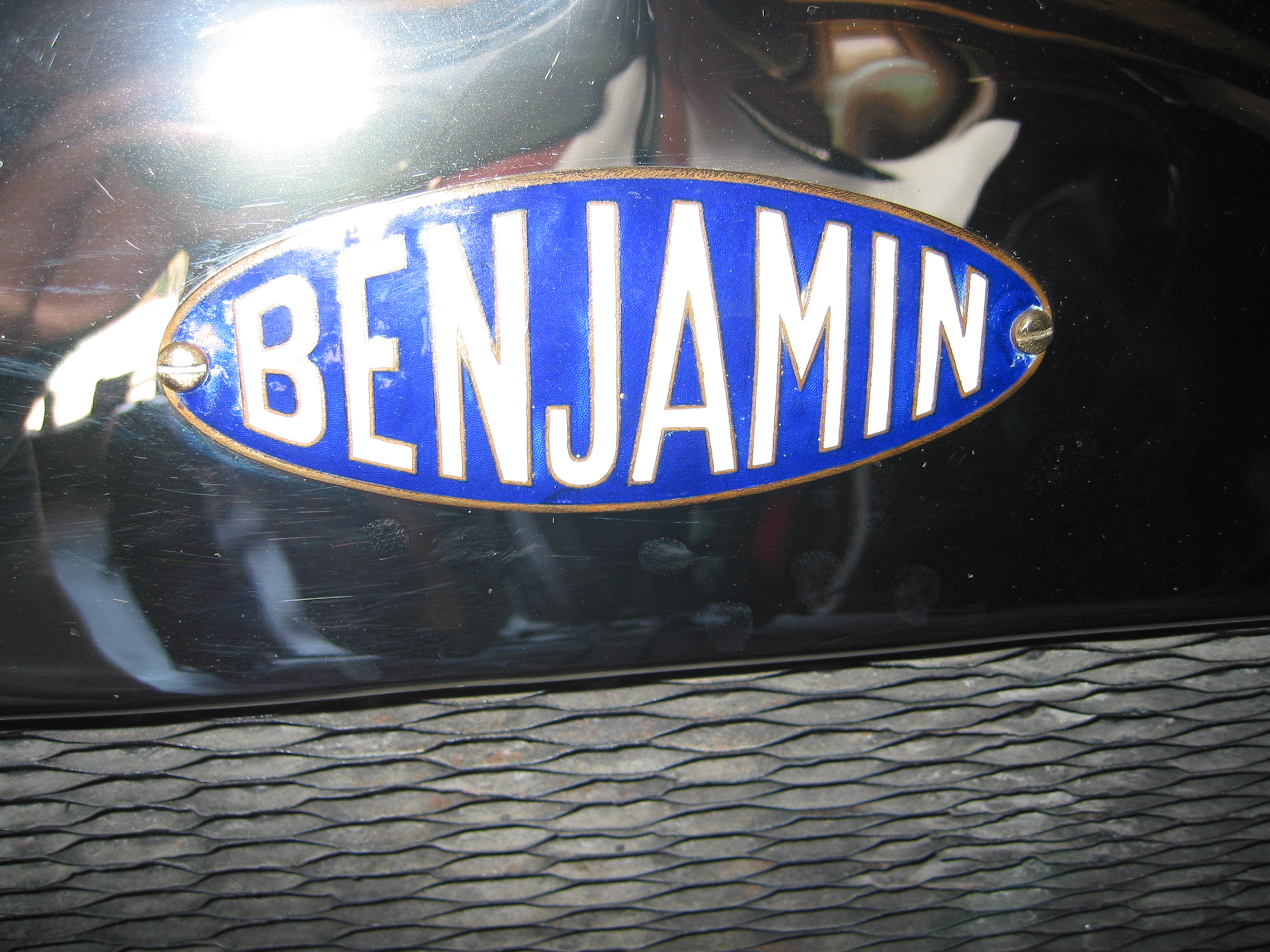

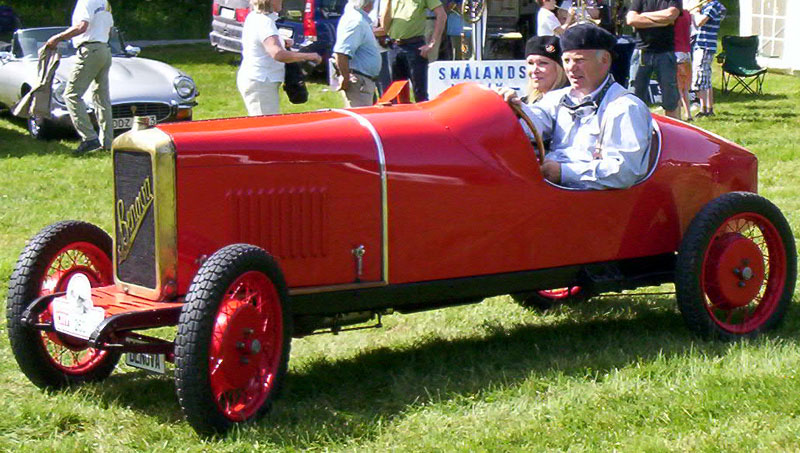
- Benova "Type B3" 2-seater Sports (1927)
- Founded: 1921
- Defunct: 1929
- Fate: reborn as Benova in 1927
- Headquarters: Asnières, France; Gennevilliers, France
- Key people: Maurice Jeanson
- Products: Cyclecars; Automobiles

Benjamin was a French manufacturer of cyclecars between 1921 and 1927 and based on the north-west edge of Paris. 1927 was a year of changes which included a name change, and between 1927 and 1929 the company operated under a new name, Benova.

The firm was established by Maurice Jeanson in Asnières at 139 Boulevard Voltaire.

== The cars ==
The business started out with a range of cycle cars, identified as the Benjamin "Type A", Benjamin "Type B" and Benjamin "Type C", a two-seater coupé. The "Type A" was powered by a 4-cylinder unit of 751cc: it weighed less than 350 kg and therefore enjoyed the favourable tax treatment available to cyclecars. The "Type B" used a 2-cylinder 547cc engine, while the "Type C" was a sporty version of the "Type A", the volume of its 4-cylinder engine increased to 817cc.

In 1924 the smaller engined Benjamin was replaced by the "Type AR". It sat on a 2,100 mm (82.7 in) wheelbase and was powered by a rear-mounted 2-stroke twin cylinder 450cc or 525cc engine.

Thanks to the success of the early models the manufacturer broadened the range with a "Type P2" and a "Type P3", but these were less successful. The "Type P2" was built on a 2,300 mm (90.6 in) wheelbase and used a 2-stroke twin cylinder engine, of 550cc, and was produced from 1924. The "Type P3" had a 2-stroke triple cylinder engine. The cylinders were the same size as on the "Type P2", but there were three of them and the engine capacity was given as 817cc. (Other sources quote engine sizes respectively of 750cc and 1125cc for the 2 and 3 cylinder "Type P2" and "Type P3" in 1924.) In October 1924, at the 19th Paris Motor Show the manufacturer's listed prices started at 5,500 francs for a 2-seater "Type AR" cyclecar, while a Torpedo bodied 2-seater "Type P2" was listed at 8,900 francs.

== Restructuring and renaming ==
Following the construction of a second factory at 39 Rue de Paris in Gennevilliers the company launched a new range, powered by engines bought in from Chapuis-Dornier. The company was now restructured and renamed as Benova. With a rapid rise in consumer incomes during the mid-1920s the cyclecar era was coming to an end, and the manufacturer moved into production of standard-sized motor cars, including even one powered by an 8-cylinder engine - albeit a small one.

At the 22nd Paris Motor Show in October 1928 Benova were exhibiting three models:

- The "Benova Type B3" used a Chapuis-Dornier 4-cylinder side-valve engine of 0.95-litres and sat on a 2,450 mm (96.5 in) wheelbase. Standard bodies included a 2-seater Torpedo, a 4-seater Torpedo and a 2-seater coupé.
- The "Benova Type E2" used a Chapuis-Dornier 4-cylinder overhead-valve engine of 1.1-litres and sat on a 2,950 mm (116.1 in) wheelbase. Standard bodies included a "Torpedo de luxe" and a 4-door "conduite interieure souple" (sedan/saloon).

Both B3 and E2 were also listed in "commercial" versions with a drop down opening hatch at the back and, according to one picture, a removable back seat.

- The "Benova Type G" used a S.C.A.P. 8-cylinder side-valve engine of 1402 cc (later, if briefly, increased to 1996cc) and sat on a 3,100 mm (122.0 in) wheelbase. Standard bodies listed included a "Torpedo grand luxe", a 4-door "conduite interieure souple" (sedan/saloon) and a cabriolet.

== Reading list ==
- Harald Linz, Halwart Schrader: Die Internationale Automobil-Enzyklopädie. United Soft Media Verlag, München 2008, ISBN 978-3-8032-9876-8. (German)
- George Nick Georgano (Chefredakteur): The Beaulieu Encyclopedia of the Automobile. Volume 1: A–F. Fitzroy Dearborn Publishers, Chicago 2001, ISBN 1-57958-293-1. (English)
- George Nick Georgano: Autos. Encyclopédie complète. 1885 à nos jours. Courtille, Paris 1975. (French)
