= Methylacetylene-propadiene gas =

Methylacetylene-propadiene (MPS) gas is a type of fuel gas used in oxy-fuel welding and cutting torches, comprising a mixture of several gases.

== MPS gases ==
An MPS gas is a mixture of two or more of propane, butane, butadiene, methylacetylene (propyne, CH_{3}C≡CH) and propadiene (CH_{2}=C=CH_{2}). They are marketed under different names including: "MPS", "Chem-O-Lean", "Apachi Gas", "FG-2 Gas", "Flamex" and "natural gas". The most commonly known type of MPS gas is the discontinued MAPP gas.

As a fuel gas, it burns hotter than propylene, propane or natural gas.

== See also ==
- Map-pro
