= Steam cracking =

Petrochemical process to break down saturated hydrocarbons in smaller molecules

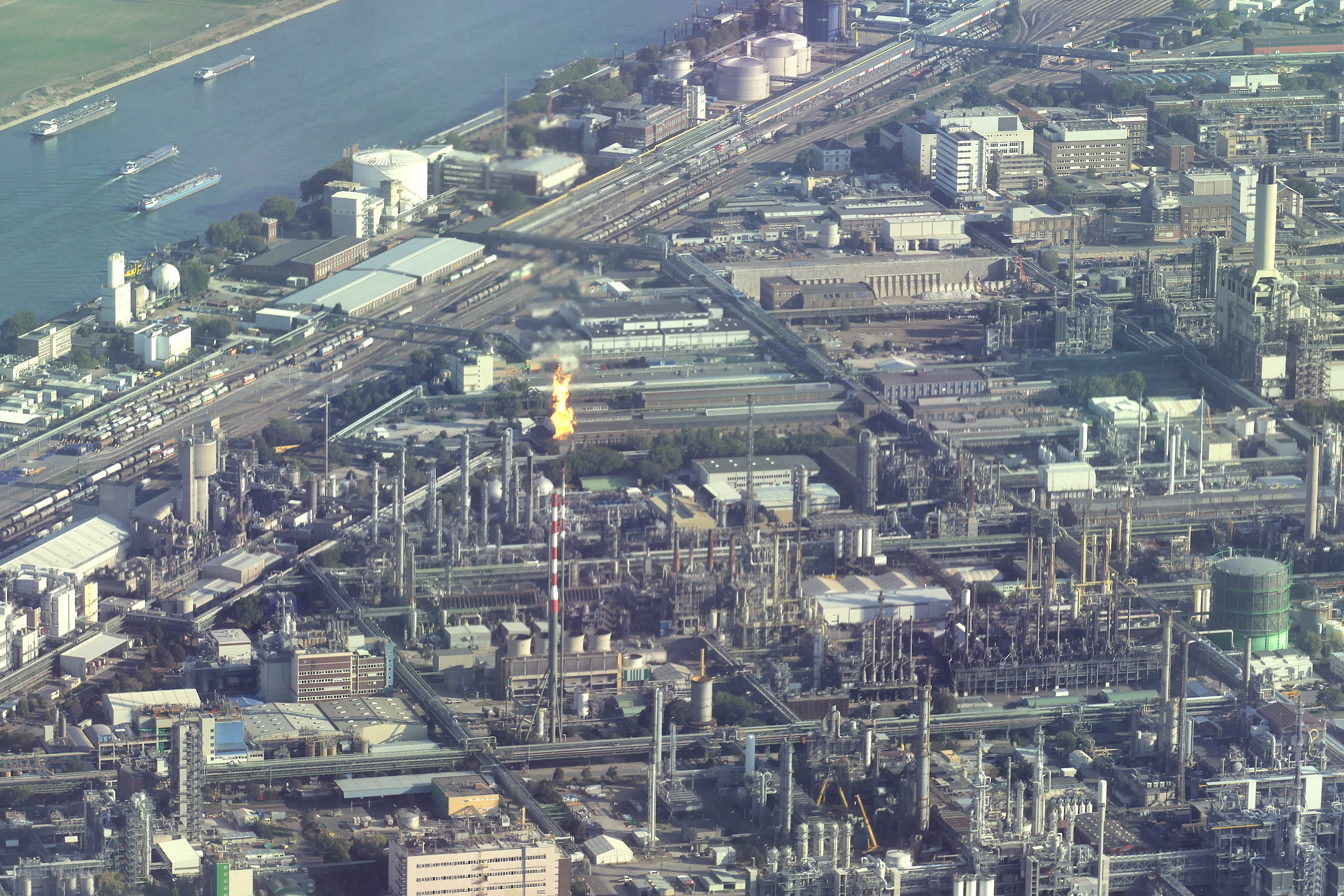
Steamcracker II at the BASF site in Ludwigshafen, Germany

Steam cracking is a petrochemical process in which saturated hydrocarbons are broken down ("cracked") into smaller, often unsaturated, hydrocarbons. It is the principal industrial method for producing the lighter alkenes (commonly called olefins), including ethene (or ethylene) and propene (or propylene). Steam cracker units are facilities in which a feedstock such as naphtha, liquefied petroleum gas (LPG), ethane, propane or butane is thermally cracked through the use of steam in steam cracking furnaces to produce lighter hydrocarbons. The propane dehydrogenation process may be accomplished through different commercial technologies. The main differences between each of them concerns the catalyst employed, design of the reactor and strategies to achieve higher conversion rates.

Olefins are useful precursors to myriad products. Steam cracking is the core technology that supports the largest scale chemical processes, i.e. ethylene and propylene.

== Process description ==
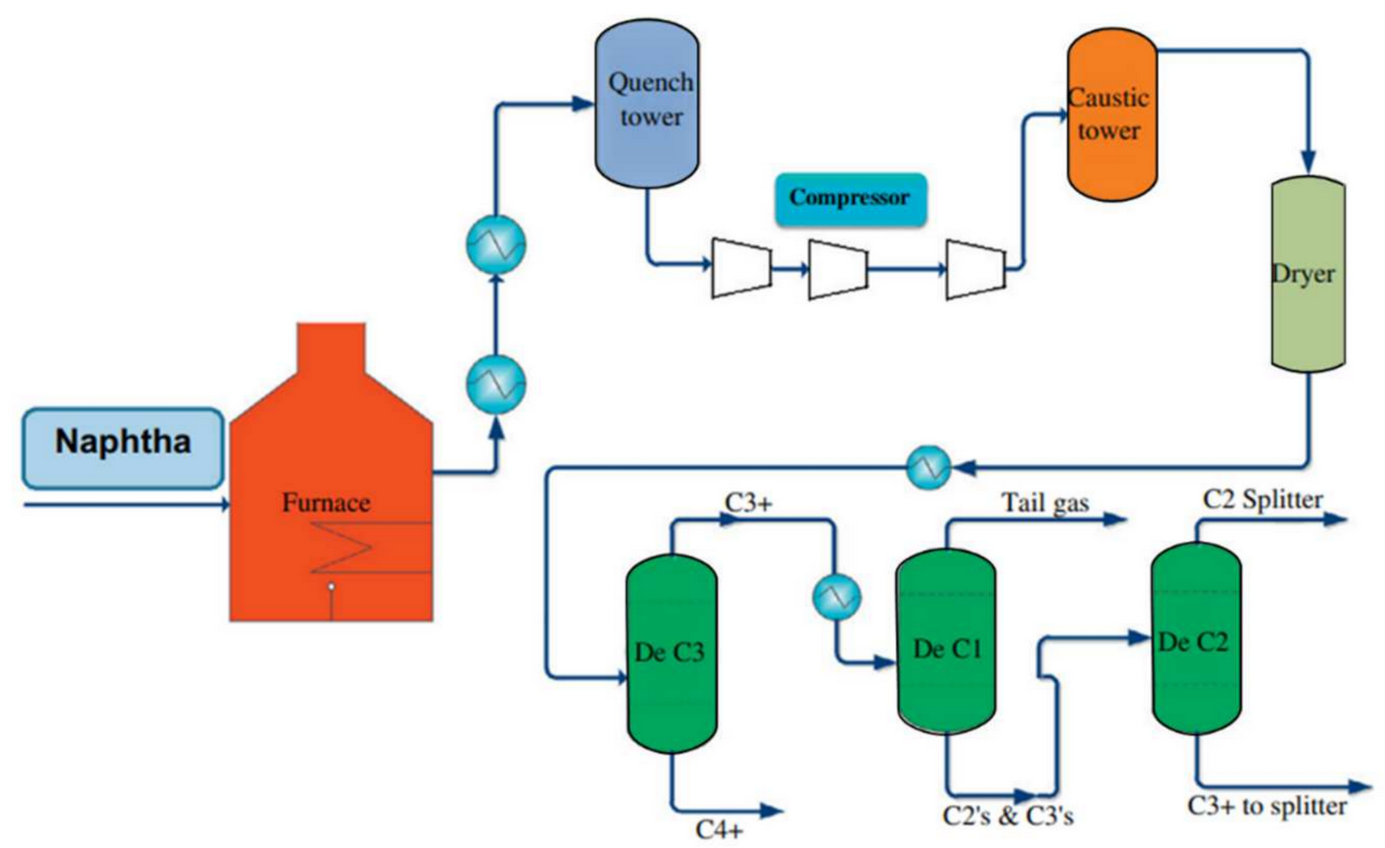
Steam cracker process diagram

Gibbs free energy per carbon atom. This shows that at high temperature, hexane can split into ethane and ethylene ("Ethen"), and ethane can split into ethylene and hydrogen. But ethylene can decompose into methane and carbon if given too much time, and all the hydrocarbons can decompose into carbon and hydrogen.

=== General ===
In steam cracking, a gaseous or liquid hydrocarbon feed like naphtha, liquified petroleum gas (LPG), or ethane is mixed with very hot steam and briefly heated in a furnace in the absence of oxygen. The reaction temperature is very high, at around 850 °C. This causes the hydrocarbons to break up into smaller molecules such as small olefins and hydrogen. The reaction occurs rapidly: the residence time is on the order of milliseconds. Flow rates approach the speed of sound. After the cracking temperature has been reached, the gas is quickly quenched in a transfer line heat exchanger or inside a "quenching header" using quench oil in order to prevent further reactions such as decomposing into carbon and hydrogen.

The products produced in the reaction depend on the composition of the feed, the hydrocarbon-to-steam ratio, and on the cracking temperature and furnace residence time. Light hydrocarbon feeds such as ethane, LPGs, or light naphtha give mainly lighter alkenes, including ethylene, propylene, and butadiene. Heavier hydrocarbon (full range and heavy naphthas as well as other refinery products) feeds give some of these same products, but also those rich in aromatic hydrocarbons and hydrocarbons suitable for inclusion in gasoline or fuel oil.

A higher cracking temperature (also referred to as severity) favors the production of ethene and benzene, whereas lower severity produces higher amounts of propene, C4-hydrocarbons and liquid products. The process also results in the slow deposition of coke, a form of carbon, on the reactor walls. This degrades the efficiency of the reactor, so reaction conditions are designed to minimize this. Nonetheless, a steam cracking furnace can usually only run for a few months at a time between de-cokings. Decokes require the furnace to be isolated from the process and then a flow of steam or a steam/air mixture is passed through the furnace coils. This converts the hard solid carbon layer to carbon monoxide and carbon dioxide. Once this reaction is complete, the furnace can be returned to service.

=== Process details ===
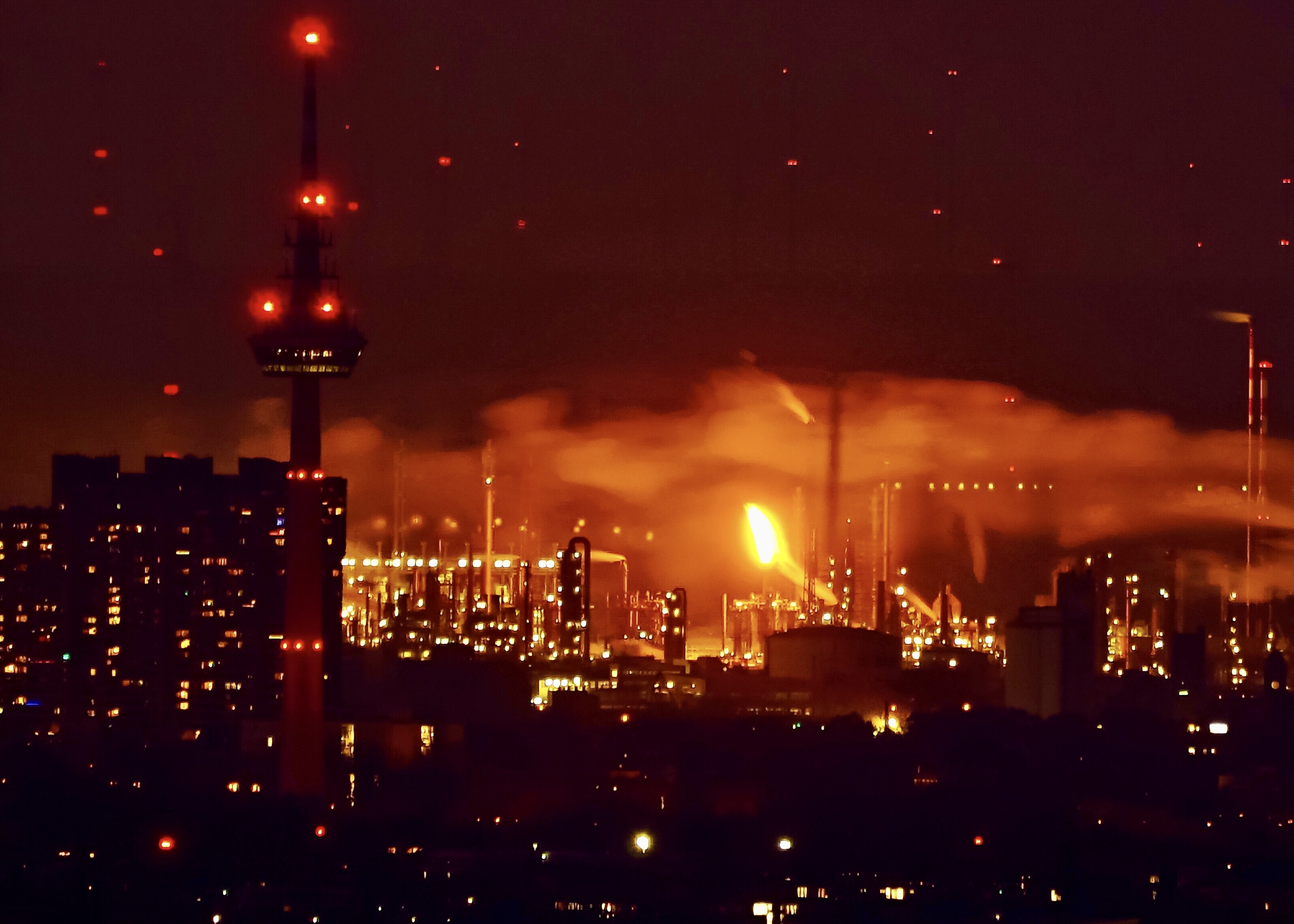
Ludwigshafen steamcracker at night

The areas of an ethylene plant are:

1. steam cracking furnaces:
2. primary and secondary heat recovery with quench;
3. a dilution steam recycle system between the furnaces and the quench system;
4. primary compression of the cracked gas (3 stages of compression);
5. hydrogen sulfide and carbon dioxide removal (acid gas removal);
6. secondary compression (1 or 2 stages);
7. drying of the cracked gas;
8. cryogenic treatment;
9. all of the cold cracked gas stream goes to the demethanizer tower. The overhead stream from the demethanizer tower consists of all the hydrogen and methane that was in the cracked gas stream. Cryogenically (−250 °F (−157 °C)) treating this overhead stream separates hydrogen from methane. Methane recovery is critical to the economical operation of an ethylene plant.
10. the bottom stream from the demethanizer tower goes to the deethanizer tower. The overhead stream from the deethanizer tower consists of all the C2's that were in the cracked gas stream. The C2 stream contains acetylene, which is explosive above 200 kPa (29 psi). If the partial pressure of acetylene is expected to exceed these values, the C2 stream is partially hydrogenated. The C2's then proceed to a C2 splitter. The product ethylene is taken from the overhead of the tower and the ethane coming from the bottom of the splitter is recycled to the furnaces to be cracked again;
11. the bottom stream from the de-ethanizer tower goes to the depropanizer tower. The overhead stream from the depropanizer tower consists of all the C3's that were in the cracked gas stream. Before feeding the C3's to the C3 splitter, the stream is hydrogenated to convert the methylacetylene and propadiene (allene) mix. This stream is then sent to the C3 splitter. The overhead stream from the C3 splitter is product propylene and the bottom stream is propane which is sent back to the furnaces for cracking or used as fuel.
12. The bottom stream from the depropanizer tower is fed to the debutanizer tower. The overhead stream from the debutanizer is all of the C4's that were in the cracked gas stream. The bottom stream from the debutanizer (light pyrolysis gasoline) consists of everything in the cracked gas stream that is C5 or heavier.

Since ethylene production is energy intensive, much effort has been dedicated to recovering heat from the gas leaving the furnaces. Most of the energy recovered from the cracked gas is used to make high pressure (1200 psig (8300 kPa)) steam. This steam is in turn used to drive the turbines for compressing cracked gas, the propylene refrigeration compressor, and the ethylene refrigeration compressor. An ethylene plant, once running, does not need to import steam to drive its steam turbines. A typical world scale ethylene plant (about 1.5 billion pounds (680 KTA) of ethylene per year) uses a 45,000 horsepower (34,000 kW) cracked gas compressor, a 30,000 hp (22,000 kW) propylene compressor, and a 15,000 hp (11,000 kW) ethylene compressor.

Despite the thorough energy integration within steam cracking plants, this process produces an immense amount of carbon dioxide. Per tonne of ethylene, 1–1.6 tonne of carbon dioxide (depending on the feedstock) is being produced. Resulting in a staggering amount of more than 300 million tonnes of carbon dioxide that is annually emitted into the atmosphere of which 70–90% is directly attributed to the combustion of fossil fuel. In the last few decades, several advances in steam cracking technology have been implemented to increase its energy efficiency. These changes include the use of oxy-fuel combustion, new burner technologies, and 3D reactor geometries. However, as is common within mature technologies these changes only led to marginal gains in energy efficiency. To drastically curb greenhouse-gas emissions of steam cracking, electrification offers a solution, as renewable electricity can be directly transformed into heat by, for example, resistive and inductive heating. As a result, several petrochemical companies have joined forces resulting in the development of several joint agreements in which they combine R&D efforts to investigate how naphtha or gas steam crackers could be operated using renewable electricity instead of fossil fuel combustion.

== Steam cracking furnace licensors ==
Several proprietary designs are available under a license that must be purchased from the design developer by any petroleum refining company desiring to construct and operate a steam cracking unit of a given design.

These are the major steam cracking furnaces designers and licensors:

- Lummus Technology
- Technip Energies
- Linde
- KBR

== See also ==
- Petroleum
- Petroleum refining processes
- Natural gas
- Cracking (chemistry)
