= C3H4 =

The molecular formula C_{3}H_{4} (molar mass: 40.06 g/mol, exact mass: 40.0313 u) may refer to:

- Cyclopropene, a cyclic alkene
- Propyne (a.k.a. methylacetylene), a common alkyne
- Propadiene, an allene
