= Carbide =

Inorganic compound group

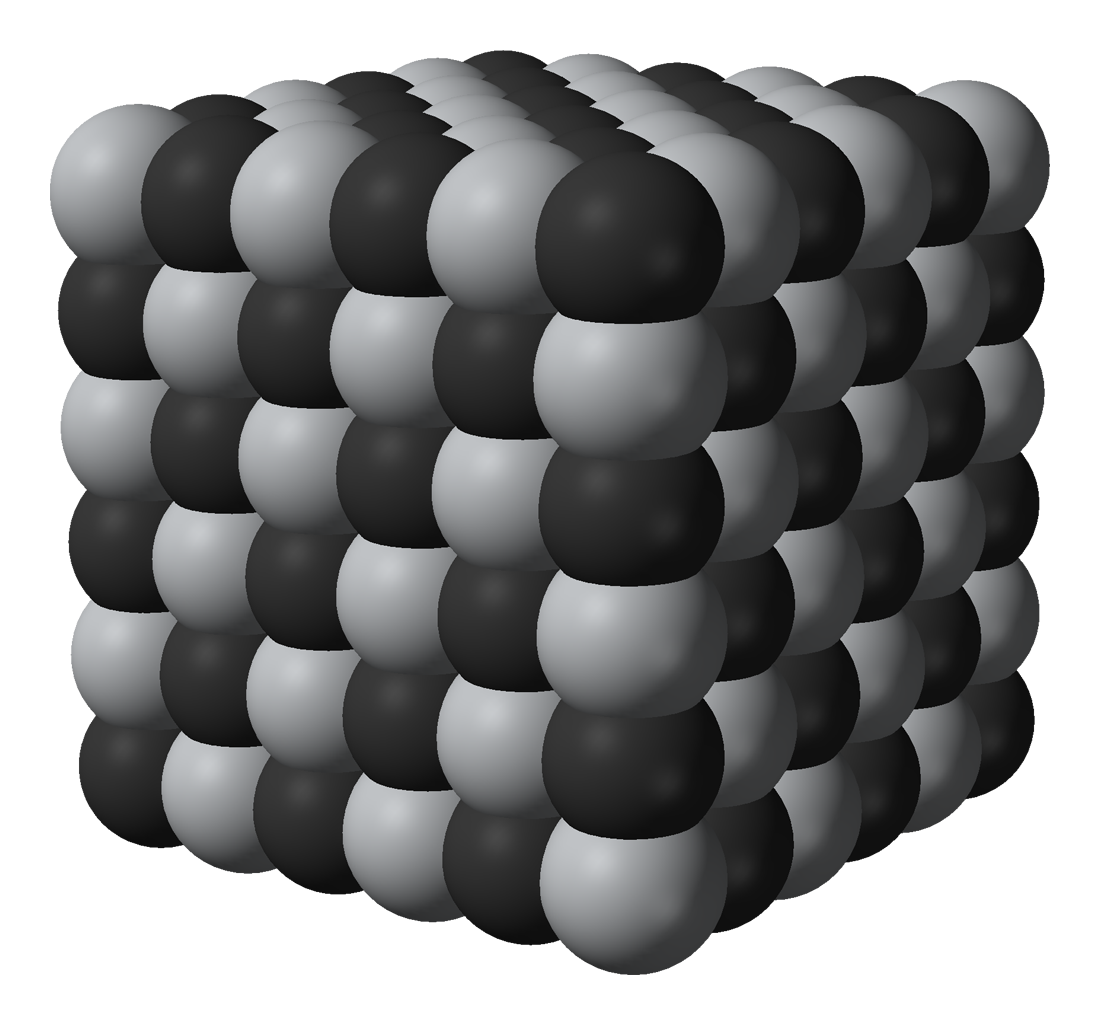
Lattice structure of titanium carbide

In chemistry, a carbide usually describes a compound composed of carbon and a metal. In metallurgy, carbiding or carburizing is the process for producing carbide coatings on a metal piece.

== Interstitial / Metallic carbides ==
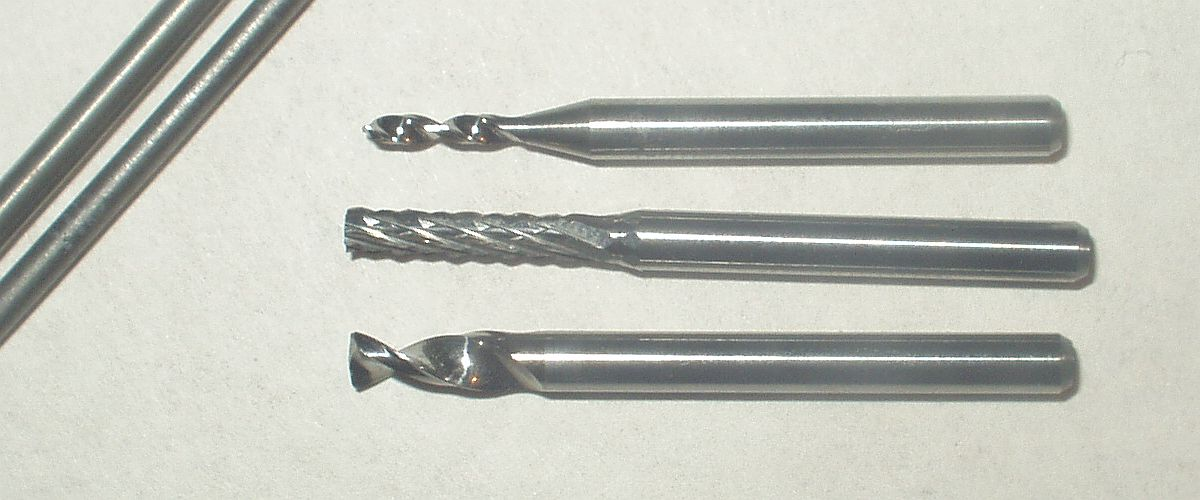
Tungsten carbide end mills

The carbides of the group 4, 5 and 6 transition metals (with the exception of chromium) are often described as interstitial compounds. These carbides have metallic properties and are refractory. Some exhibit a range of stoichiometries, being a non-stoichiometric mixture of various carbides arising due to crystal defects. Some of them, including titanium carbide and tungsten carbide, are important industrially and are used to coat metals in cutting tools.

The long-held view is that the carbon atoms fit into octahedral interstices in a close-packed metal lattice when the metal atom radius is greater than approximately 135 pm:

- When the metal atoms are cubic close-packed, (ccp), then filling all of the octahedral interstices with carbon achieves 1:1 stoichiometry with the rock salt structure.
- When the metal atoms are hexagonal close-packed, (hcp), as the octahedral interstices lie directly opposite each other on either side of the layer of metal atoms, filling only one of these with carbon achieves 2:1 stoichiometry with the CdI_{2} structure.

The following table shows structures of the metals and their carbides. (N.B. the body centered cubic structure adopted by vanadium, niobium, tantalum, chromium, molybdenum and tungsten is not a close-packed lattice.) The notation "h/2" refers to the M_{2}C type structure described above, which is only an approximate description of the actual structures. The simple view that the lattice of the pure metal "absorbs" carbon atoms can be seen to be untrue as the packing of the metal atom lattice in the carbides is different from the packing in the pure metal, although it is technically correct that the carbon atoms fit into the octahedral interstices of a close-packed metal lattice.

| Metal | Structure of pure metal | Metallic radius (pm) | MC metal atom packing | MC structure | M_{2}C metal atom packing | M_{2}C structure | Other carbides |
|---|---|---|---|---|---|---|---|
| titanium | hcp | 147 | ccp | rock salt | | | |
| zirconium | hcp | 160 | ccp | rock salt | | | |
| hafnium | hcp | 159 | ccp | rock salt | | | |
| vanadium | bcc | 134 | ccp | rock salt | hcp | h/2 | V_{4}C_{3} |
| niobium | bcc | 146 | ccp | rock salt | hcp | h/2 | Nb_{4}C_{3} |
| tantalum | bcc | 146 | ccp | rock salt | hcp | h/2 | Ta_{4}C_{3} |
| chromium | bcc | 128 | | | | | Cr_{23}C_{6}, Cr_{3}C, Cr_{7}C_{3}, Cr_{3}C_{2} |
| molybdenum | bcc | 139 | | hexagonal | hcp | h/2 | Mo_{3}C_{2} |
| tungsten | bcc | 139 | | hexagonal | hcp | h/2 | |

For a long time the non-stoichiometric phases were believed to be disordered with a random filling of the interstices, however short and longer range ordering has been detected.

Iron forms a number of carbides, Fe_{3}C, Fe_{7}C_{3} and Fe_{2}C. The best known is cementite, Fe_{3}C, which is present in steels. These carbides are more reactive than the interstitial carbides; for example, the carbides of Cr, Mn, Fe, Co and Ni are all hydrolysed by dilute acids and sometimes by water, to give a mixture of hydrogen and hydrocarbons. These compounds share features with both the inert interstitials and the more reactive salt-like carbides.

Some metals, such as lead and tin, are believed not to form carbides under any circumstances. There exists however a mixed titanium-tin carbide, which is a two-dimensional conductor.

== Chemical classification of carbides ==
Carbides can be generally classified by the chemical bonds type as follows:

1. salt-like (ionic),
2. covalent compounds,
3. interstitial compounds, and
4. "intermediate" transition metal carbides.

Examples include calcium carbide (CaC_{2}), silicon carbide (SiC), tungsten carbide (WC; often called, simply, carbide when referring to machine tooling), and cementite (Fe_{3}C), each used in key industrial applications. The naming of ionic carbides is not systematic.

=== Salt-like / saline / ionic carbides ===
Salt-like carbides are composed of highly electropositive elements such as the alkali metals, alkaline earth metals, lanthanides, actinides, and group 3 metals (scandium, yttrium, and lutetium). Aluminium from group 13 forms carbides, but gallium, indium, and thallium do not. These materials feature isolated carbon centers, often described as "C^{4−}", in the methanides or methides; two-atom units, "C^{2−}_{2}", in the acetylides; and three-atom units, "C^{4−}_{3}", in the allylides. Some larger anions are also possible.

The graphite intercalation compound KC_{8}, prepared from vapour of potassium and graphite, and the alkali metal derivatives of C_{60} are not usually classified as carbides.

==== Methanides ====
Methanides are a subset of carbides distinguished by their tendency to decompose in water producing methane. Three examples are aluminium carbide Al_{4}C_{3}, magnesium carbide Mg_{2}C and beryllium carbide Be_{2}C.

Transition metal carbides are not saline: their reaction with water is very slow and is usually neglected. For example, depending on surface porosity, 5–30 atomic layers of titanium carbide are hydrolyzed, forming methane within 5 minutes at ambient conditions, following by saturation of the reaction.

Note that methanide in this context is a trivial historical name. According to the IUPAC systematic naming conventions, a compound such as NaCH_{3} would be termed a "methanide", although this compound is often called methylsodium. See methyl group § Methyl anion for more information about the CH^{−}_{3} anion.

==== Acetylides/ethynides ====
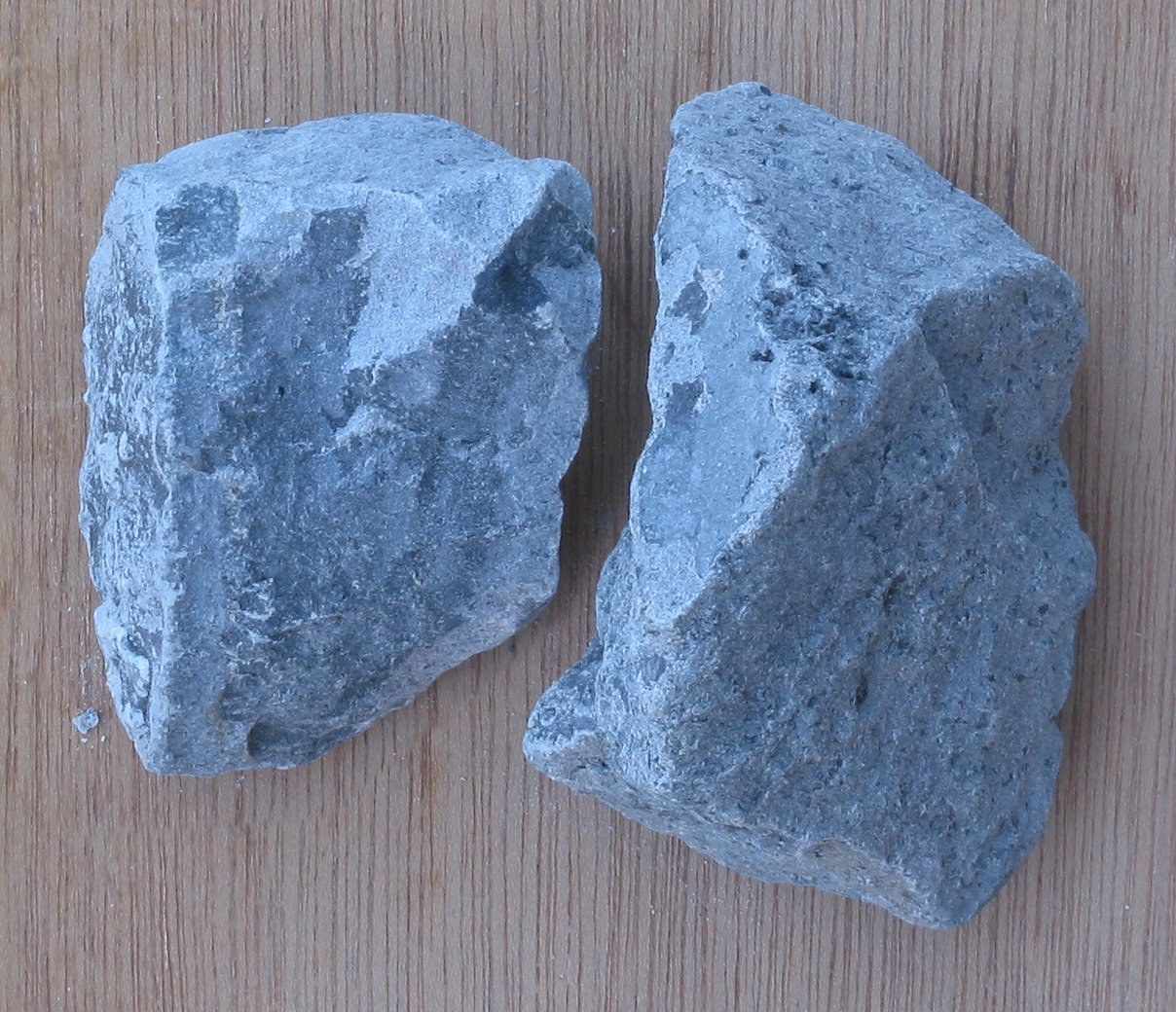
Calcium carbide

Several carbides are assumed to be salts of the acetylide anion C^{2−}_{2} (also called percarbide, by analogy with peroxide), which has a triple bond between the two carbon atoms. Alkali metals, alkaline earth metals, and lanthanoid metals form acetylides, for example, sodium carbide Na_{2}C_{2}, calcium carbide CaC_{2}, and LaC_{2}. Lanthanides also form carbides (sesquicarbides, see below) with formula M_{2}C_{3}. Metals from group 11 also tend to form acetylides, such as copper(I) acetylide and silver acetylide. Carbides of the actinide elements, which have stoichiometry MC_{2} and M_{2}C_{3}, are also described as salt-like derivatives of C^{2−}_{2}.

The C–C triple bond length ranges from 119.2 pm in CaC_{2} (similar to ethyne), to 130.3 pm in LaC_{2} and 134 pm in UC_{2}. The bonding in LaC_{2} has been described in terms of La^{III} with the extra electron delocalised into the antibonding orbital on C^{2−}_{2}, explaining the metallic conduction.

==== Allylides ====
The polyatomic ion C^{4−}_{3}, sometimes called allylide, is found in Li_{4}C_{3} and Mg_{2}C_{3}. The ion is linear and is isoelectronic with CO_{2}. The C–C distance in Mg_{2}C_{3} is 133.2 pm.

Mg_{2}C_{3} hydrolysis yields methylacetylene, CH_{3}CCH, and propadiene, CH_{2}CCH_{2}, which was the first indication that the salt contains C^{4−}_{3}. Conversely, Li_{4}C_{3} is made from the reaction of propyne and 4 equivalents of butyllithium in hexanes.

Due to its higher lattice energy, Mg_{2}C_{3} is much more stable than Li_{4}C_{3}. For example, only the latter of the two reacts explosively with bromine.

==== "Lithiocarbons" ====
Few perlithiated analogues of hydrocarbons are known. butyllithium replaces alkyne hydrogens at both the terminal and propargylic positions. Thus propyne, pentadiyne, and diacetylene have all been perlithiated.

=== Covalent carbides ===
Carbides of silicon and boron are described as "covalent carbides", although virtually all compounds of carbon exhibit some covalent character. Silicon carbide has two similar crystalline forms, which are both related to the diamond structure. Boron carbide, B_{4}C, on the other hand, has an unusual structure which includes icosahedral boron units linked by carbon atoms. In this respect boron carbide is similar to the boron rich borides. Both silicon carbide (also known as carborundum) and boron carbide are very hard materials and refractory. Both materials are important industrially. Boron also forms other covalent carbides, such as B_{25}C.

=== Molecular carbides ===
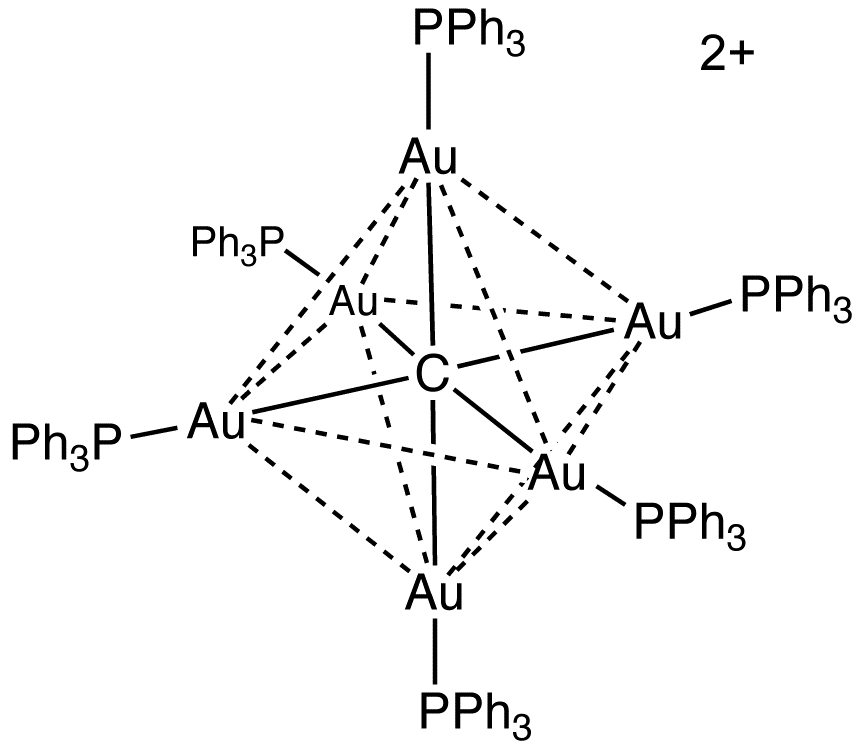
The complex [Au_{6}C(PPh_{3})_{6}]^{2+}, containing a carbon-gold core

Metal complexes containing C are known as metal carbido complexes. Most common are carbon-centered octahedral clusters, such as [Au_{6}C(PPh_{3})_{6}]^{2+} (where "Ph" represents a phenyl group) and [Fe_{6}C(CO)_{6}]^{2−}. Similar species are known for the metal carbonyls and the early metal halides, as well as the lithium cluster Li_{6}C.

A few terminal carbides have been isolated, such as [CRuCl_{2}(P(C_{6}H_{11})_{3})_{2}].

Metallocarbohedrynes (or "met-cars") are stable clusters with the general formula M_{8}C_{12} where M is a transition metal (Ti, Zr, V, etc.).

== Related materials ==
In addition to the carbides, other groups of related carbon compounds exist:

- graphite intercalation compounds
- alkali metal fullerides
- endohedral fullerenes, where the metal atom is encapsulated within a fullerene molecule
- metallacarbohedrenes (met-cars) which are cluster compounds containing C_{2} units.
- tunable nanoporous carbon, where gas chlorination of metallic carbides removes metal molecules to form a highly porous, near-pure carbon material capable of high-density energy storage.
- transition metal carbene complexes.
- two-dimensional transition metal carbides: MXenes

== See also ==
- Kappa-carbides
