= Axial chirality =

Type of symmetry in molecules

Two types of molecules having axial chirality: allenes (left) and binaryl atropisomers (right)

In chemistry, axial chirality is a special case of chirality in which a molecule contains two pairs of chemical groups in a non-planar arrangement about an axis of chirality so that the molecule is not superposable on its mirror image. The axis of chirality (or chiral axis) is usually determined by a chemical bond that is constrained against free rotation either by steric hindrance of the groups, as in substituted biaryl compounds such as BINAP, or by torsional stiffness of the bonds, as in the C=C double bonds in allenes such as glutinic acid. Axial chirality is most commonly observed in substituted biaryl compounds wherein the rotation about the aryl–aryl bond is restricted so it results in chiral atropisomers, as in various ortho-substituted biphenyls, and in binaphthyls such as BINAP.

Axial chirality differs from central chirality (point chirality) in that axial chirality does not require a chiral center such as an asymmetric carbon atom, the most common form of chirality in organic compounds. Bonding to asymmetric carbon has the form Cabcd where a, b, c, and d must be distinct groups. Allenes have the form abC=C=Ccd and the groups need not all be distinct as long as groups in each pair are distinct: abC=C=Cab is sufficient for the compound to be chiral, as in penta-2,3-dienedioic acid. Similarly, chiral atropisomers of the form abC−Ccd may have some identical groups (abC−Cab), as in BINAP.

== Nomenclature ==
The enantiomers of axially chiral compounds are usually given the stereochemical labels (R_{a}) and (S_{a}), sometimes abbreviated (R) and (S). The designations are based on the same Cahn–Ingold–Prelog priority rules used for tetrahedral stereocenters. The chiral axis is viewed end-on and the two "near" and two "far" substituents on the axial unit are ranked, but with the additional rule that the two near substituents have higher priority (1 and 2) than the far ones (3 and 4).

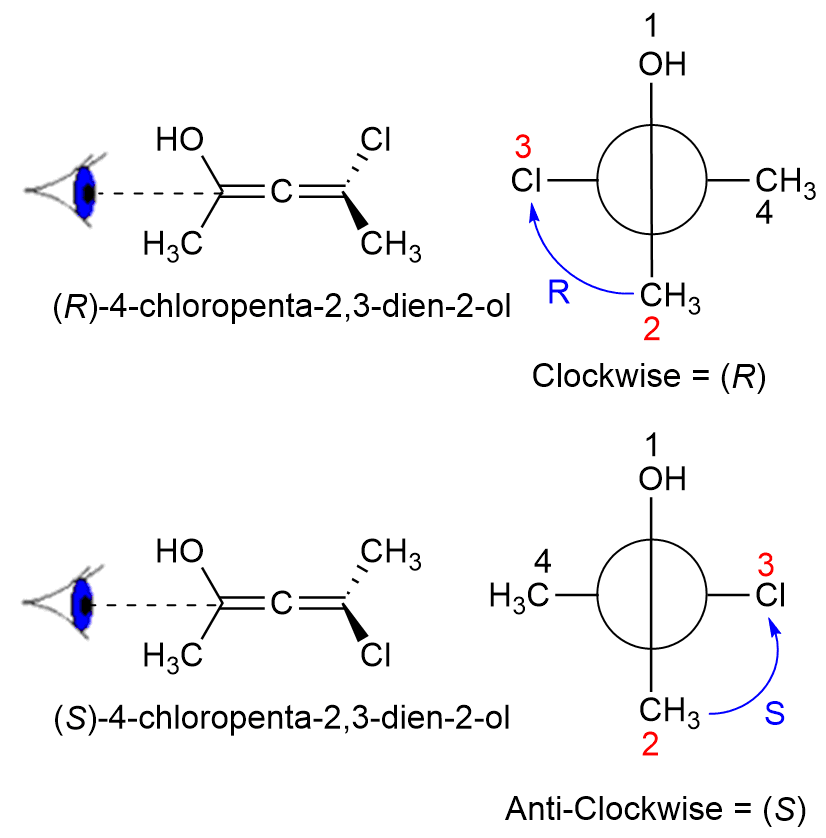
R and S configurations are determined by precedences of the groups attached to the axial section of the molecule when viewed along that axis.

== Helical chirality ==
The chirality of a molecule that has a helical, propeller, or screw-shaped geometry is called helicity or helical chirality. The screw axis or the D_{n}, or C_{n} principal symmetry axis is considered to be the axis of chirality. Some sources consider helical chirality to be a type of axial chirality, and some do not. IUPAC does not refer to helicity as a type of axial chirality.

Enantiomers having helicity may labeled by using the prefix notation (P) ("plus") or Δ (from Latin dexter, "right") for a right-handed helix, and (M) ("minus") or Λ (Latin laevus, "left") for a left-handed helix. The P/M or Δ/Λ terminology is used particularly for molecules that actually resemble a helix, such as the helicenes. This notation can also be applied to non-helical structures having axial chirality by considering the helical orientation of the Cahn–Ingold–Prelog group rankings of the "front" groups compared to the "back", when viewed from either direction along the axis.

P helicity

M helicity

Configurations of [7]helicene
