= 1,1,3-Trichloropropene =

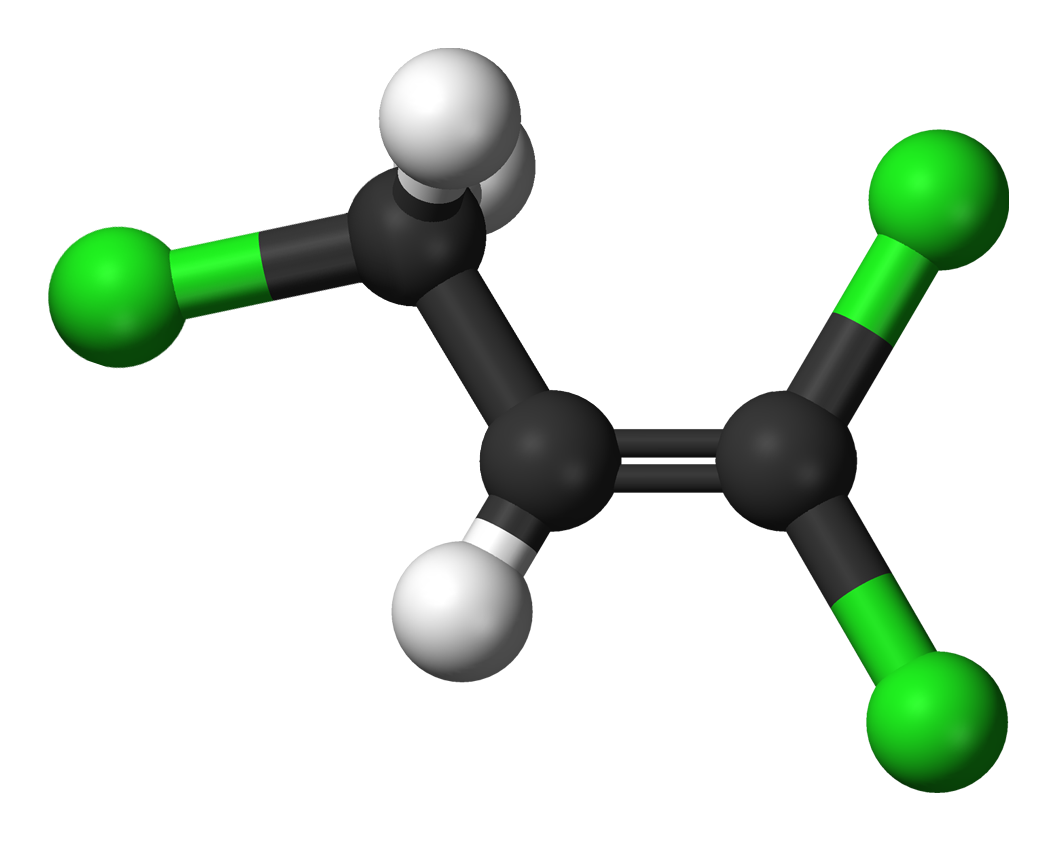

Names
- Preferred IUPAC name 1,1,3-Trichloroprop-1-ene

Identifiers
CAS Number	2567-14-8
3D model (JSmol)	Interactive image
ChEMBL	ChEMBL160390
ChemSpider	16442
ECHA InfoCard	100.018.095
EC Number	219-903-8
PubChem CID	17378
UNII	D17VR5IUWK
CompTox Dashboard (EPA)	DTXSID0073958
- InChI: InChI=1S/C3H3Cl3/c4-2-1-3(5)6/h1H,2H2 Key: JFEVIPGMXQNRRF-UHFFFAOYSA-N
- SMILES: C(C=C(Cl)Cl)Cl

Properties
Chemical formula	C_{3}H_{3}Cl_{3}
Molar mass	145.41 g·mol^{−1}
Density	1.376 g cm^{−3}

Hazards
- GHS labelling
Pictograms	(GHS02: Flammable) (GHS07: Exclamation mark)
Signal word	Warning
Hazard statements	H226, H302, H319
Precautionary statements	P210, P233, P240, P241, P242, P243, P264, P270, P280, P301+P312, P303+P361+P353, P305+P351+P338, P330, P337+P313, P370+P378, P403+P235, P501
- Except where otherwise noted, data are given for materials in their standard state (at 25 °C [77 °F], 100 kPa). Infobox references

1,1,3-Trichloropropene is a compound of carbon, hydrogen, and chlorine. The structure is like propene, but in this compound, three hydrogen atoms are changed into chlorine atoms.
