= Penta-2,3-dienedioic acid =

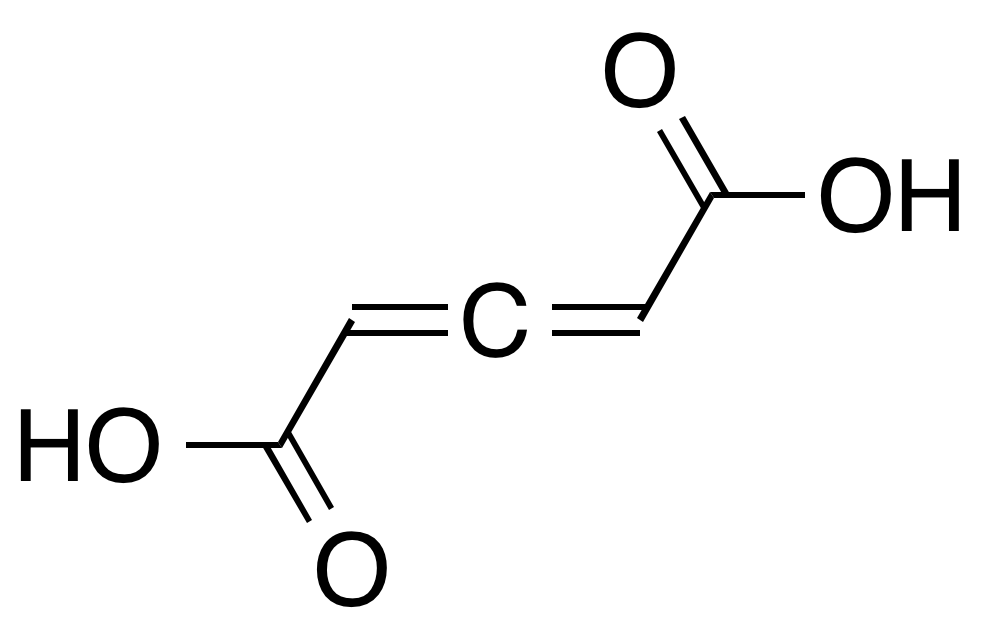

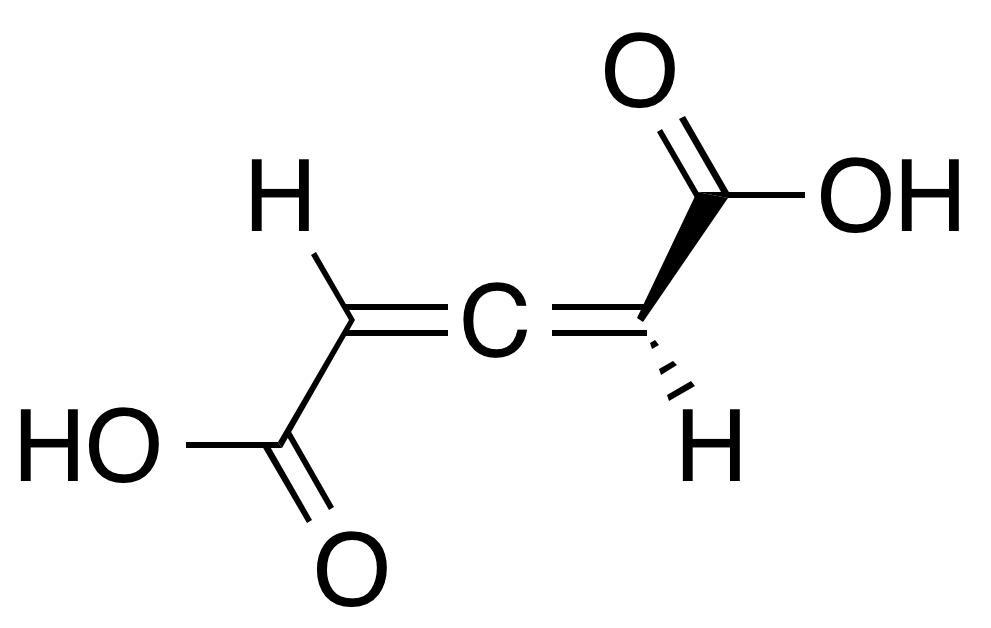
(R) enantiomer
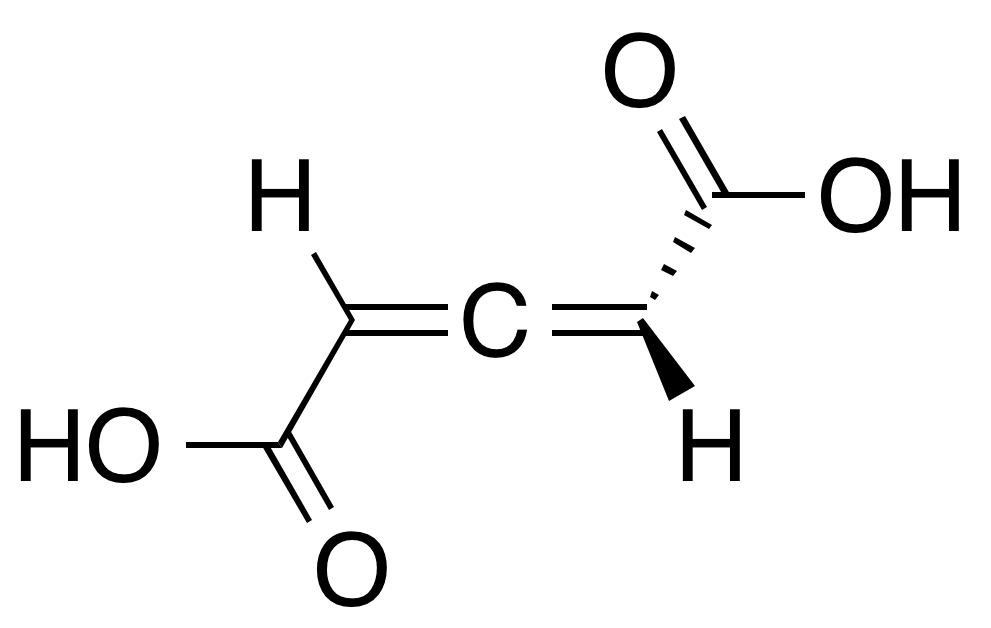
(S) enantiomer

Names
- IUPAC name Penta-2,3-dienedioic acid
- Other names: 1,3-Allenedicarboxylic acid; Diacrylic acid; Glutinic acid; 2,3-Pentadienedioic acid

Identifiers
CAS Number	32804-68-5
3D model (JSmol)	R-glutinic acid: Interactive image; S-glutinic acid: Interactive image
ChemSpider	4411426
PubChem CID	135471958
CompTox Dashboard (EPA)	DTXSID00412684
- InChI: InChI=1S/C5H4O4/c6-4(7)2-1-3-5(8)9/h2-3H,(H,6,7)(H,8,9) Key: FEFVVCZNGBRBSB-UHFFFAOYSA-N
- SMILES: R-glutinic acid: O=C(O)C=C=CC(O)=O; S-glutinic acid: O=C(O)C=C=C([H@])C(O)=O

Properties
Chemical formula	C_{5}H_{4}O_{4}
Molar mass	128.083 g·mol^{−1}
- Except where otherwise noted, data are given for materials in their standard state (at 25 °C [77 °F], 100 kPa). Infobox references

Penta-2,3-dienedioic acid (one of two chemicals called glutinic acid), is an allene-containing dicarboxylic acid. It was the first allene to be synthesized, in 1887, but the structure of it was thought to be a propyne core instead of an allene. The correct structural isomeric identity was not determined until 1954.

Glutinic acid, a substituted allene, was isolated from Alnus glutinosa (Betulaceae).

The dimethyl ester can be synthesized from the dehydration of the corresponding ketodiacid.

== Literature confusion ==
A diterpene, chemical name (4aR,5S,6R,8aR)-5-[(Z)-4-carboxy-3-methylbut-3-enyl]-5,6,8a-trimethyl-3,4,4a,6,7,8-hexahydronaphthalene-1-carboxylic acid (CID 6444268 from PubChem), is also called glutinic acid. Some database entries for "glutinic acid" incorrectly identify it as this diterpene rather than the allene meaning in the underlying publications.
