= Allene =

Any organic compound containing a C=C=C group

Propadiene, the simplest allene, is also known as allene

In organic chemistry, allenes are organic compounds in which one carbon atom has double bonds with each of its two adjacent carbon atoms (R_{2}C=C=CR_{2}, where R is hydrogen (H) or some organyl group). Allenes are classified as cumulated dienes. The parent compound of this class is propadiene (H_{2}C=C=CH_{2}), which itself is also called allene. A group of the structure R_{2}C=C=CR− is called allenyl, while a substituent attached to an allene is referred to as an allenic substituent (R is H or some alkyl group). In analogy to allylic and propargylic, a substituent attached to a saturated carbon α (i.e., directly adjacent) to an allene is referred to as an allenylic substituent. While allenes have two consecutive ('cumulated') double bonds, compounds with three or more cumulated double bonds are called cumulenes.

== History ==
For many years, allenes were viewed as curiosities but thought to be synthetically useless and difficult to prepare and to work with. Reportedly, the first synthesis of an allene, glutinic acid, was performed in an attempt to prove the non-existence of this class of compounds. The situation began to change in the 1950s, and more than 300 papers on allenes have been published in 2012 alone. These compounds are not just interesting intermediates but synthetically valuable targets themselves; for example, over 150 natural products are known with an allene or cumulene fragment.

== Structure and properties ==
=== Geometry ===
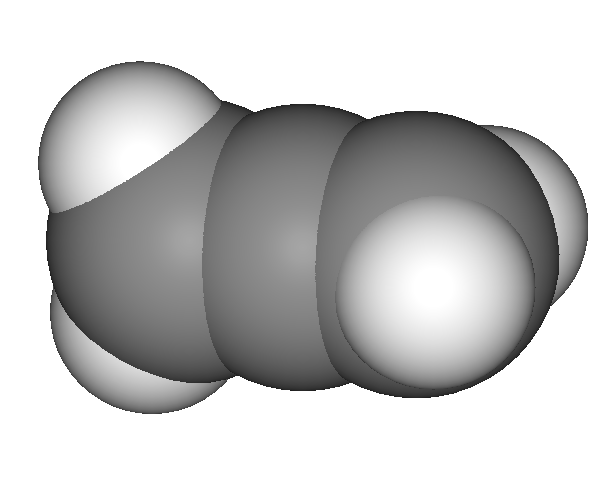
3D view of propadiene (allene)

The central carbon atom of allenes forms two sigma bonds and two pi bonds. The central carbon atom is sp-hybridized, and the two terminal carbon atoms are sp^{2}-hybridized. The bond angle formed by the three carbon atoms is 180°, indicating linear geometry for the central carbon atom. The two terminal carbon atoms are planar, and these planes are twisted 90° from each other. The structure can also be viewed as an "extended tetrahedral" with a similar shape to methane, an analogy that is continued into the stereochemical analysis of certain derivative molecules.

=== Symmetry ===
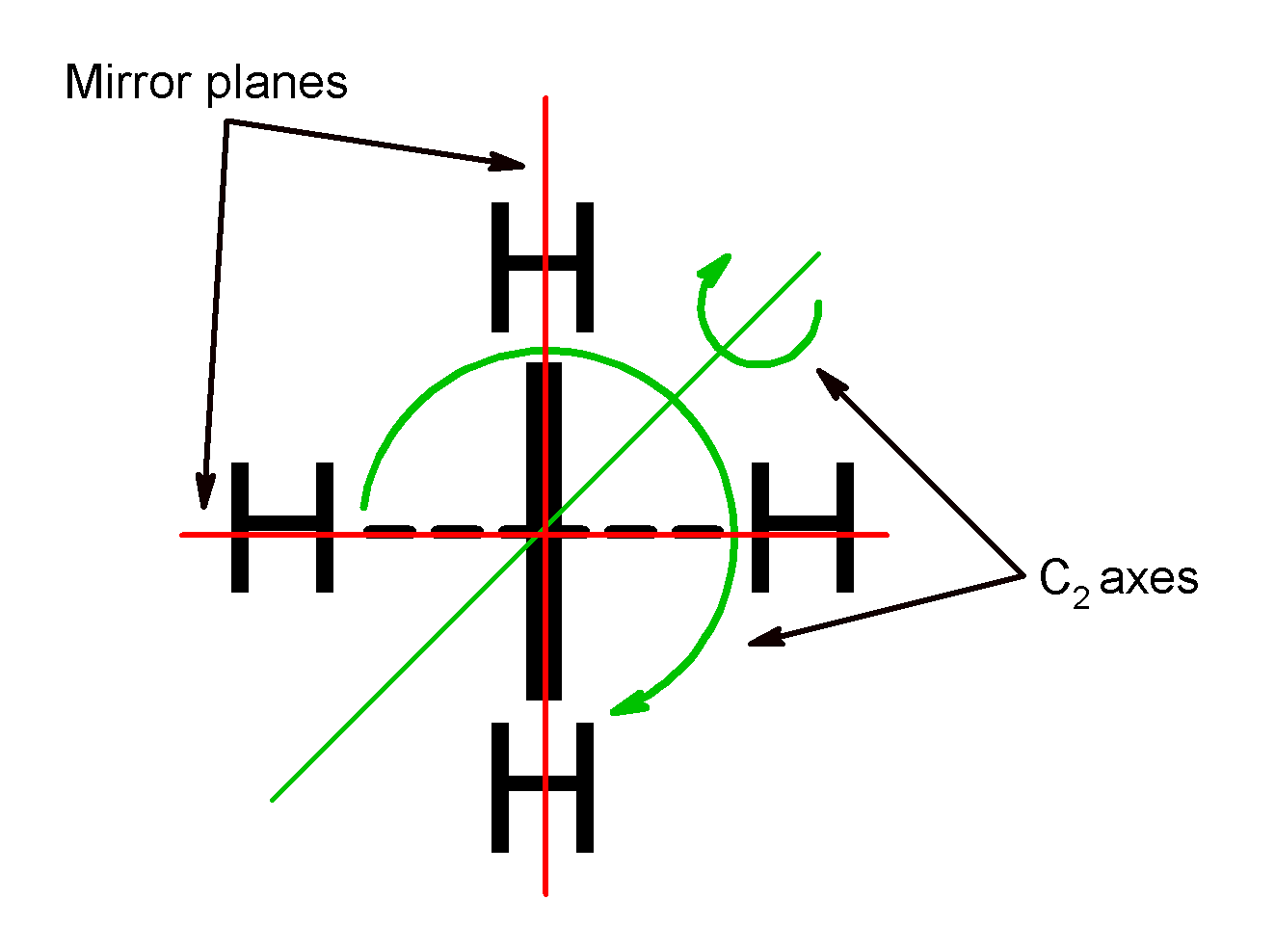

The symmetry and isomerism of allenes has long fascinated organic chemists. For allenes with four identical substituents, there exist two twofold axes of rotation through the central carbon atom, inclined at 45° to the CH_{2} planes at either end of the molecule. The molecule can thus be thought of as a two-bladed propeller. A third twofold axis of rotation passes through the C=C=C bonds, and there is a mirror plane passing through both CH_{2} planes. Thus this class of molecules belong to the D_{2d} point group. Because of the symmetry, an unsubstituted allene has no net dipole moment, that is, it is a non-polar molecule.

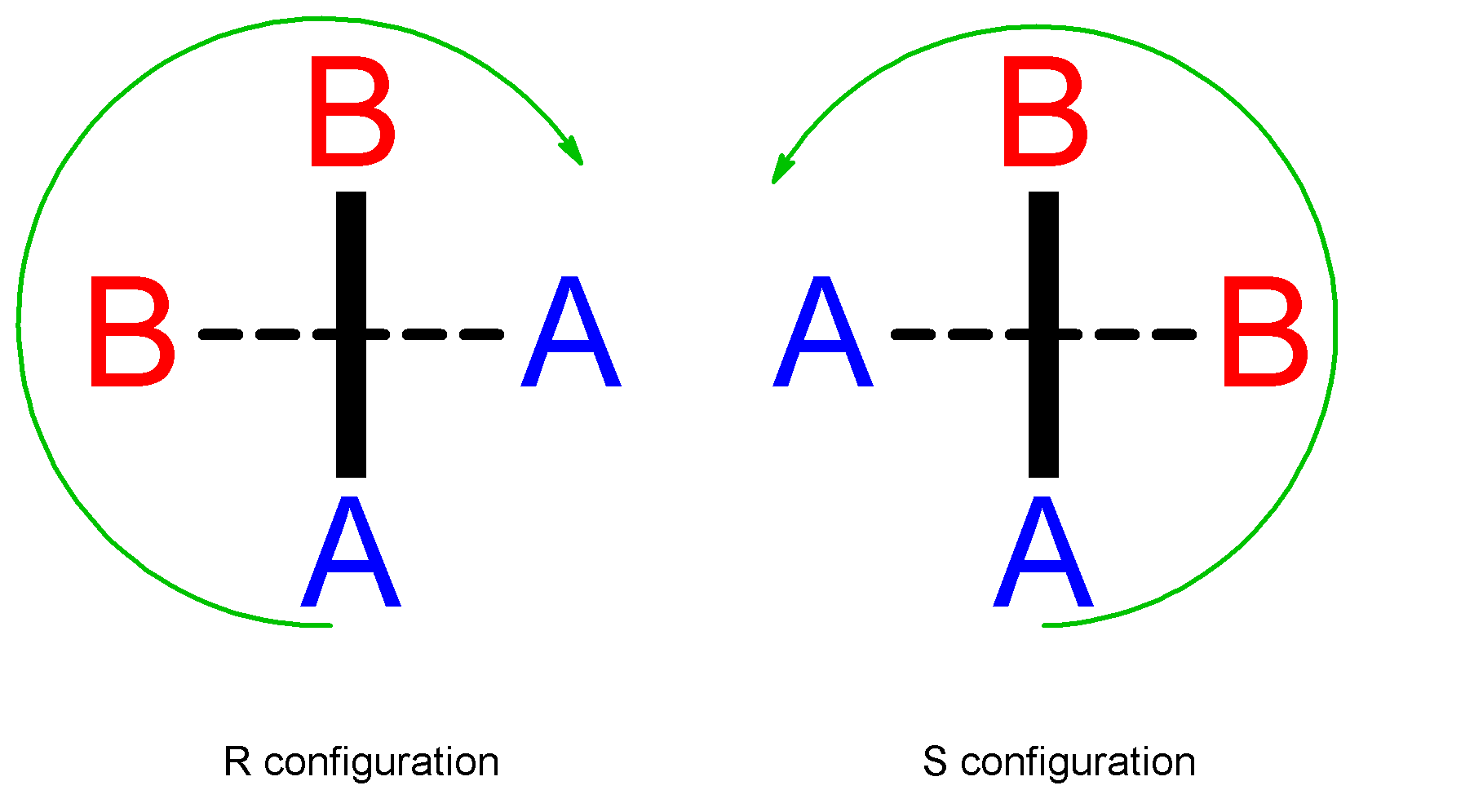
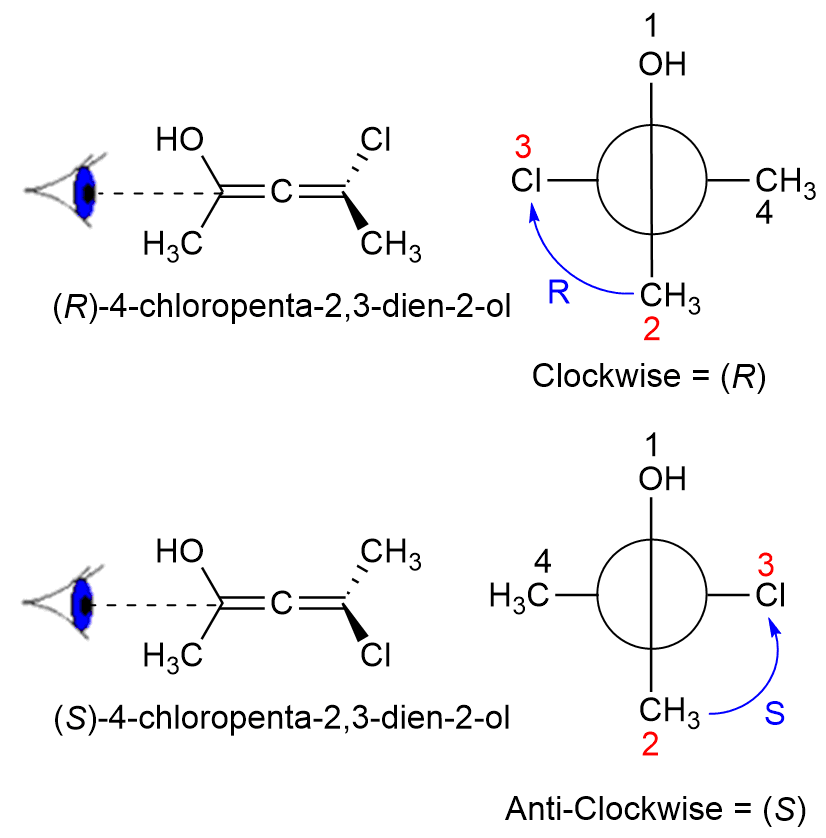
R and S configurations are determined by precedences of the groups attached to the axial section of the molecule when viewed along that axis. The front plane is given higher priority over the other and the final assignment is given from priority 2 to 3 (i.e. the relationship between the two planes).

An allene with two different substituents on each of the two carbon atoms will be chiral because there will no longer be any mirror planes. The chirality of these types of allenes was first predicted in 1875 by Jacobus Henricus van 't Hoff, but not proven experimentally until 1935. Where A has a greater priority than B according to the Cahn–Ingold–Prelog priority rules, the configuration of the axial chirality can be determined by considering the substituents on the front atom followed by the back atom when viewed along the allene axis. For the back atom, only the group of higher priority need be considered.

Chiral allenes have been recently used as building blocks in the construction of organic materials with exceptional chiroptical properties. There are a few examples of drug molecule having an allene system in their structure. Mycomycin, an antibiotic with tuberculostatic properties, is a typical example. This drug exhibits enantiomerism due to the presence of a suitably substituted allene system.

Although the semi-localized textbook σ-π separation model describes the bonding of allene using a pair of localized orthogonal π orbitals, the full molecular orbital description of the bonding is more subtle. The symmetry-correct doubly-degenerate HOMOs of allene (adapted to the D_{2d} point group) can either be represented by a pair of orthogonal MOs or as twisted helical linear combinations of these orthogonal MOs. The symmetry of the system and the degeneracy of these orbitals imply that both descriptions are correct (in the same way that there are infinitely many ways to depict the doubly-degenerate HOMOs and LUMOs of benzene that correspond to different choices of eigenfunctions in a two-dimensional eigenspace). However, this degeneracy is lifted in substituted allenes, and the helical picture becomes the only symmetry-correct description for the HOMO and HOMO–1 of the C_{2}-symmetric 1,3-dimethylallene. This qualitative MO description extends to higher odd-carbon cumulenes (e.g., 1,2,3,4-pentatetraene).

=== Chemical and spectral properties ===
Allenes differ considerably from other alkenes in terms of their chemical properties. Compared to isolated and conjugated dienes, they are considerably less stable: comparing the isomeric pentadienes, the allenic 1,2-pentadiene has a heat of formation of 33.6 kcal/mol, compared to 18.1 kcal/mol for (E)-1,3-pentadiene and 25.4 kcal/mol for the isolated 1,4-pentadiene.

The C–H bonds of allenes are considerably weaker and more acidic compared to typical vinylic C–H bonds: the bond dissociation energy is 87.7 kcal/mol (compared to 111 kcal/mol in ethylene), while the gas-phase acidity is 381 kcal/mol (compared to 409 kcal/mol for ethylene), making it slightly more acidic than the propargylic C–H bond of propyne (382 kcal/mol).

The ^{13}C NMR spectrum of allenes is characterized by the signal of the sp-hybridized carbon atom, resonating at a characteristic 200-220 ppm. In contrast, the sp^{2}-hybridized carbon atoms resonate around 80 ppm in a region typical for alkyne and nitrile carbon atoms, while the protons of a CH_{2} group of a terminal allene resonate at around 4.5 ppm – somewhat upfield of a typical vinylic proton.

Allenes possess a rich cycloaddition chemistry, including both [4+2] and [2+2] modes of addition, as well as undergoing formal cycloaddition processes catalyzed by transition metals. Allenes also serve as substrates for transition metal catalyzed hydrofunctionalization reactions.

Much like acetylenes, electron-poor allenes are unstable. Tetrachloroallene polymerizes quantitatively to perchloro(1,2-dimethylenecyclobutane) at −50 °C.

Cyclic allenes with fewer than 10 ring atoms are strained. Those with fewer than 8 atoms generally only form unstable aryne-like intermediates. The latter are sometimes stabilized by diradical or ylidic resonance structures.

== Synthesis ==
Although allenes often require specialized syntheses, the parent allene, propadiene is produced industrially on a large scale as an equilibrium mixture with propyne:

$$\ce{H2C=C=CH2 <=> H3C-C#CH}$$

This mixture, known as MAPP gas, is commercially available. At 298 K, the ΔG° of this reaction is –1.9 kcal/mol, corresponding to K_{eq} = 24.7.

The first allene to be synthesized was penta-2,3-dienedioic acid, which was prepared by Burton and Pechmann in 1887. However, the structure was only correctly identified in 1954.

Laboratory methods for the formation of allenes include:

- from geminal dihalocyclopropanes and organolithium compounds (or metallic sodium or magnesium) via the Skattebøl rearrangement of cyclopropylidene carbenes/carbenoids (Doering–LaFlamme allene synthesis)
- from reaction of certain terminal alkynes with formaldehyde, copper(I) bromide, and added base (Crabbé–Ma allene synthesis)
- from propargylic halides by S_{N}2′ displacement by an organocuprate
- from dehydrohalogenation of certain dihalides
- from reaction of a triphenylphosphinyl ester with an acid halide, a Wittig reaction accompanied by dehydrohalogenation
- from propargylic alcohols via the Myers allene synthesis protocol—a stereospecific process
- from metalation of allene or substituted allenes with BuLi and reaction with electrophiles (RX, R_{3}SiX, D_{2}O, etc.)

The chemistry of allenes has been reviewed in a number of books and journal articles. Some key approaches towards allenes are outlined in the following scheme:

One of the older methods is the Skattebøl rearrangement (also called the Doering–Moore–Skattebøl or Doering–LaFlamme rearrangement), in which a gem-dihalocyclopropane 3 is treated with an organolithium compound (or dissolving metal) and the presumed intermediate rearranges into an allene either directly or via carbene-like species. Notably, even strained allenes can be generated by this procedure. Modifications involving leaving groups of different nature are also known. Arguably, the most convenient modern method of allene synthesis is by sigmatropic rearrangement of propargylic substrates. Johnson–Claisen and Ireland–Claisen rearrangements of ketene acetals 4 have been used a number of times to prepare allenic esters and acids. Reactions of vinyl ethers 5 (the Saucy–Marbet rearrangement) give allene aldehydes, while propargylic sulfenates 6 give allene sulfoxides. Allenes can also be prepared by nucleophilic substitution in 9 and 10 (nucleophile Nu^{−} can be a hydride anion), 1,2-elimination from 8, proton transfer in 7, and other, less general, methods.

== Use and occurrence ==
Allene itself is the most commonly used member of this family; it exists in equilibrium with propyne as a component of MAPP gas.

=== Research ===
The reactivity of substituted allenes has been well explored.

The two π-bonds are located at the 90° angle to each other, and thus require a reagent to approach from somewhat different directions. With an appropriate substitution pattern, allenes exhibit axial chirality as predicted by Van 't Hoff as early as 1875. Protonation of allenes gives cations 11 that undergo further transformations. Reactions with soft electrophiles (e.g. Br^{+}) deliver positively charged onium ions 13. Transition-metal-catalysed reactions proceed via allylic intermediates 15 and have attracted significant interest in recent years. Numerous cycloadditions are also known, including [4+2]-, (2+1)-, and [2+2]-variants, which deliver, e.g., 12, 14, and 16, respectively.

=== Occurrence ===
Fucoxanthin, the most abundant of all carotinoids, is the light-absorbing pigment in the chloroplasts of brown algae, giving them a brown or olive-green color.

Numerous natural products contain the allene functional group. Noteworthy are the pigments fucoxanthin and peridinin. Little is known about the biosynthesis, although it is conjectured that they are often generated from alkyne precursors.

Allenes serve as ligands in organometallic chemistry. A typical complex is Pt(η^{2}-allene)(PPh_{3})_{2}. Ni(0) reagents catalyze the cyclooligomerization of allene. Using a suitable catalyst (e.g. Wilkinson's catalyst), it is possible to reduce just one of the double bonds of an allene.

== Delta convention ==
Many rings or ring systems are known by semisystematic names that assume a maximum number of noncumulative bonds. To unambiguously specify derivatives that include cumulated bonds (and hence fewer hydrogen atoms than would be expected from the skeleton), a lowercase delta may be used with a subscript indicating the number of cumulated double bonds from that atom, e.g. 8δ^{2}-benzocyclononene. This may be combined with the λ-convention for specifying nonstandard valency states, e.g. 2λ^{4}δ^{2},5λ^{4}δ^{2}-thieno[3,4-c]thiophene.

== See also ==
- Cumulenes − compounds with three or more adjacent carbon–carbon double bonds
- Trisilaallenes − silicon analogs
