= Kappa-carbide =

κ-Carbides are a special class of carbide structures. They are most known for appearing in steels containing manganese and aluminium where they have the molecular formula (Fe,Mn)_{3}AlC.

== Properties ==
=== Structure ===
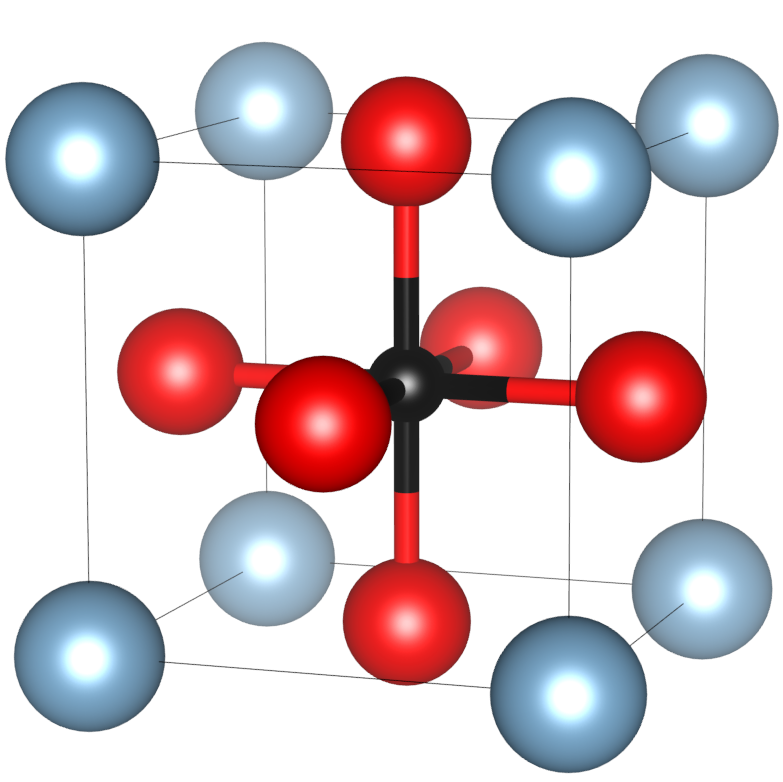
Typical κ-carbide structure with Fe (red), Al (metallic) and C (black)

κ-Carbides crystallise in the perovskite structure type with the space group Pm3̅m (Nr. 221). This structure was, inter alia, elucidated with XRD-measurements on steel alloys containing κ-carbide precipitates but also on single crystals of manganese-κ-carbides with a molecular formula of Mn_{3.1}Al_{0.9}C and a lattice parameter of a=3.87Å. In steel alloys where diverse arrangements of the atoms are possible, a considerable effect of the short range ordering, e.g. of iron and manganese on the microscopic properties of the alloy, has been observed. This is especially important for the role as hydrogen-traps in steels.

=== Composition ===
A first glance at the composition of a steel alloy is achieved by analysing its surface with EDX-technique.

Depending on the content of the alloying elements of the steel, different types of κ-carbides can form. They occur in both ferritic (α-Fe) and austenitic (γ-Fe) steels. Typical alloying elements are iron, manganese, aluminium, carbon, and silicon.

=== Magnetism ===
SQUID measurements on polycrystalline Mn_{3.1}Al_{0.9}C revealed a soft ferromagnetic behaviour of this κ-carbide with a Curie temperature of 295±13 K, a remanent magnetic moment of 3.22 μ_{B} and a coercive field of 1.9 mT. DFT-simulations confirmed these findings and indicated that other κ-carbides behave similarly.

== Occurrence ==
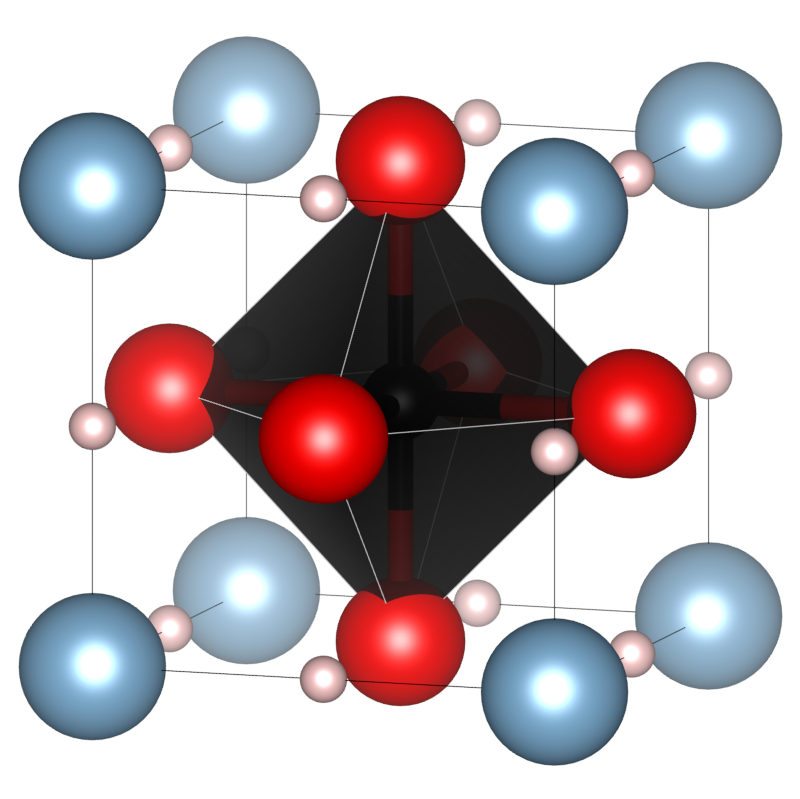
Fe_{3}AlC κ-carbide with interstitial sites that can be occupied by H atoms

κ-carbides are typically found as precipitates in high-performance steels. A common example is the TRIPLEX steel with the generic composition Fe_{x}Mn_{y}Al_{z}C containing 18-28 % manganese, 9-12 % aluminium and 0.7-1.2 % carbon (in mass %). It is a high-strength, low-density steel consisting of austenitic γ–Fe(Mn,Al,C) solid solution, nano size κ-carbides (Fe,Mn)_{3}AlC_{1-x} and α–Fe(Al,Mn) ferrite. Other similar steels are known for their high ductility. κ-carbides are usually formed from areas enriched in carbon through spinodal decomposition and are key determinants of the properties of these steels. The low density is e.g. obtained after a hot rolling post-process. Upon cooling, different domains of austenite and ferrite are formed and κ-carbides form at the boundaries of these domains. Continuing the cooling process leads to a phase transition of austenite to ferrite and the κ-carbides are released as a result of an eutectoid transformation in form of a precipitate.

The κ-carbides can have an additional strengthening effect on steels because they can function as a hydrogen trap to counteract hydrogen embrittlement. Ab-initio DFT-simulations have shown that hydrogen can occupy the same site as carbon in the κ-carbide precipitates or an initially empty interstitial lattice site. Hereby, it was found that an increased Mn content enhances the H-trapping by attractive short-range interactions. The aforementioned short-range ordering of Fe and Mn in the κ-carbide has a significant influence on the strength of this effect. This behaviour can be used as an additional method to cope with hydrogen embrittlement which is normally prevented by simply minimising the contact of metal and hydrogen.

== See also ==
- Contemporary steel
- Carbon steel
- Alloy steels
