= BernzOmatic =

American manufacturing company

BernzOmatic logo

Bernzomatic is an American manufacturing company. It was founded by Otto Bernz (May 21, 1856 – February 17, 1932) in 1876 in Newark, New Jersey as Otto Bernz Co.. The company manufactures handheld torches and accessories, especially gas burner torches using fuel cylinders containing butane, propane, MAPP gas, and oxygen for soldering, brazing, and welding. Its trademark torch packs include Basic Use, Multi-Application, and Specialty. Its products include torches, fuel cylinders, kits, solders and accessories, and utility lighters.

== History ==
=== 1876–Present ===
In the early 1930s s Otto Bernz Co. relocated to Rochester, New York listed as Otto Bernz Co Inc. In 1982, Bernzomatic became a division of Newell (now Newell Rubbermaid).

On July 1, 2011, Worthington Cylinders division of Worthington Industries purchased Bernzomatic for $51 million.

In 2014, Bernzomatic's manufacturing facility in Medina, New York was consolidated with a location in Chilton, Wisconsin.

Bernzomatic, now a Worthington entity, continues to manufacture handheld propane and propylene ("Map-pro") cylinders found at big-box and hardware stores.

== Consumer Product Safety Commission Recall ==
A report addressing various defects with the Bernzomatic torch products was published in February 2019: United Testing Services Study On February 23, 2012, all fuel cylinders containing MAP/Pro (propylene) and MAPP gas were recalled. Cylinders containing propane fuel were omitted from the recall but under review due to several injuries, including a fatality. On February 14, 2019, a study was released identifying several alleged defects with all of the cylinders, regardless of fuel content.

The report alleges design and manufacturing defects at the neck of the cylinders and with certain torch attachments, leading to breach of certain cylinders and severe burn injuries. In some instances severe injuries, including a fatality, were noted due to explosions attributed to failure of a pressure relief valve.
