= Propynyllithium =

Names
- IUPAC name 1-Lithium-1-propyne
- Other names 1-Propyn-1-yllithium

Identifiers
CAS Number	4529-04-8
3D model (JSmol)	Interactive image
ChemSpider	10488464
ECHA InfoCard	100.022.604
EC Number	224-862-4
PubChem CID	78287
CompTox Dashboard (EPA)	DTXSID80963361
- InChI: InChI=1S/C3H3.Li/c1-3-2;/h1H3;/q-1;+1 Key: ATKCLEUSJFRRKA-UHFFFAOYSA-N
- SMILES: [Li+].CC#[C-]

Properties
Chemical formula	C_{3}H_{3}Li
Molar mass	46.00 g·mol^{−1}
Appearance	Whitish powder
Solubility in water	Decomposition

Hazards
- GHS labelling
Pictograms	(GHS02: Flammable) (GHS05: Corrosive)
- Except where otherwise noted, data are given for materials in their standard state (at 25 °C [77 °F], 100 kPa). Infobox references

Propynyllithium is an organolithium compound with the chemical formula LiC_{2}CH_{3}. It is a white solid that is soluble in 1,2-dimethoxyethane, and tetrahydrofuran. To preclude its degradation by oxygen and water, propynyllithium and its solutions are handled under inert gas (argon or nitrogen). Although commonly depicted as a monomer, propynyllithium adopts a more complicated cluster structure as seen for many other organolithium compounds.

== Synthesis ==
Various preparations of propynyllithium are known, but the most expeditious route starts with 1-bromopropene:

CH_{3}CH=CHBr + 2 BuLi → CH_{3}C≡CLi + 2 BuH + LiBr

=== Historic routes ===
It can be prepared by passing propyne gas through a solution of n-butyllithium or by direct metallization of propyne with lithium in liquid ammonia or other solvent. Propyne, however, is an expensive gas, and, therefore, it is sometimes replaced by less expensive gas mixtures used for welding and containing a small percentage of propyne.

== Applications ==
Propynyllithium is used in the organic synthesis as a reactant. It is a nucleophile that adds to aldehydes to give secondary alcohols, with ketones to give tertiary alcohols, and with acid chlorides to give ketones containing the propynyl group. These reactions are used in the synthesis of complex natural and synthetic substances such as the drug mifepristone.
