= Lanthanum carbide =

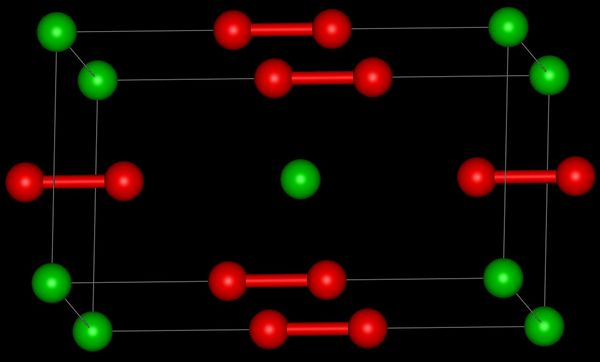

Names
- Other names Dicarbidolanthanum(II)

Identifiers
CAS Number	12071-15-7
3D model (JSmol)	Interactive image
ChemSpider	109890
ECHA InfoCard	100.031.923
EC Number	235-128-8
PubChem CID	123280
CompTox Dashboard (EPA)	DTXSID60894846
- InChI: InChI=1S/C2.La/c1-2;/q-1; Key: ZKEYULQFFYBZBG-UHFFFAOYSA-N; InChI=1/C2.La/c1-2;/q-1; Key: ZKEYULQFFYBZBG-UHFFFAOYAS
- SMILES: [C-]#[C-].[La3+]

Properties
Chemical formula	LaC_{2}
Molar mass	162.927 g/mol
Appearance	tetrahedral crystals
Density	5.29 g/cm^{3}, solid
Melting point	2,360 °C (4,280 °F; 2,630 K)

Structure
Crystal structure	Tetragonal
Space group	D^{17}_{4h}, I4/mmm, tI6
Coordination geometry	6
- Except where otherwise noted, data are given for materials in their standard state (at 25 °C [77 °F], 100 kPa). verify (what is ?) Infobox references

Lanthanum carbide (LaC_{2}) is a chemical compound. It is being studied in relation to the manufacture of certain types of superconductors and nanotubes.

== Preparation ==
LaC_{2} can be prepared by reacting lanthanum oxide, La_{2}O_{3}, with carbon in an electric furnace, or by melting pellets of the elements in an arc furnace.

== Properties ==
LaC_{2} reacts with water to form acetylene, C_{2}H_{2} and a mixture of complex hydrocarbons. LaC_{2} is a metallic conductor, in contrast to CaC_{2} which is an insulator. The crystal structure of LaC_{2} shows that it contains C_{2} units with a C-C bond length of 130.3 pm, which is longer than the C-C bond length in calcium carbide, 119.2 pm, which is close to that of ethyne. The structure of LaC_{2} can be described as La^{3+}C_{2}^{2−}(e-) where the electron enters the conduction band and antibonding orbitals on the C_{2} anion, increasing the bond length. This is analogous to the bonding present in the nitridoborate, CaNiBN.

== Lanthanum carbide in carbon nano structures ==
A method for making macroscopic quantities of C_{60} and the confirmation of the hollow, cagelike structures was published in 1990 by Kratschmer and co-workers. This was followed by the publication of methods for higher fullerenes (C_{70} and higher). In 1993, scientists discovered how to make a compound which is not as susceptible to moisture and air. They made containers to hold buckminsterfullerenes, or buckyballs; therefore they nicknamed the containers ‘buckyjars’. A few US patents were issued to universities in the mid-1990s; experiments with manufacturing techniques have continued at universities around the globe, including India, Japan, and Sweden.

== Lanthanum atoms caged in fullerenes ==
In La@C_{72}, the lanthanum appears to stabilize the C_{72} carbon cage. A 1998 study by Stevenson et al. verified the presence of La@C_{72} as well as La_{2}@C_{72}, but empty-cage C_{72} was absent, based on laser desorption mass spectrometry and UV−vis spectroscopy. A 2008 study by Lu et al. showed that La_{2}C_{72} do not adhere to the isolated pentagon rule (IPR), but has two pairs of fused pentagons at each pole of the cage and that the two La atoms reside close to the two fused-pentagon pairs. This result lends additional support to the idea that the carbon cage is stabilized by the La atoms.

In addition to the properties included in the table at right, the magnetic properties of bulk amounts of La@C_{82} (isolated from various hollow fullerenes) have been tested. Magnetization data for an isolated La@C_{82} isomer were obtained using a SQUID magnetometer at temperatures ranging from 3 to 300 K. For La@C_{82} the inverse susceptibility as a function of temperature was observed to follow a Curie-Weiss law. The effective magnetic moment per La@C_{82} was found to be 0.38μ_{B}.

Lanthanum carbide has also shown superconductive properties when converted into a layered lanthanum carbide halide La_{2}C_{2}X_{2} (X=Br,I). Investigations using high-resolution neutron powder diffraction measurements from room temperature to 1.5 Kelvin showed that it has superconductive properties at about 7.03 Kelvin for X=Br and at about 1.7 Kelvin for X=I, respectively.
