= Propylene =

Chemical compound (CH3CH=CH2)

Skeletal formula of propene

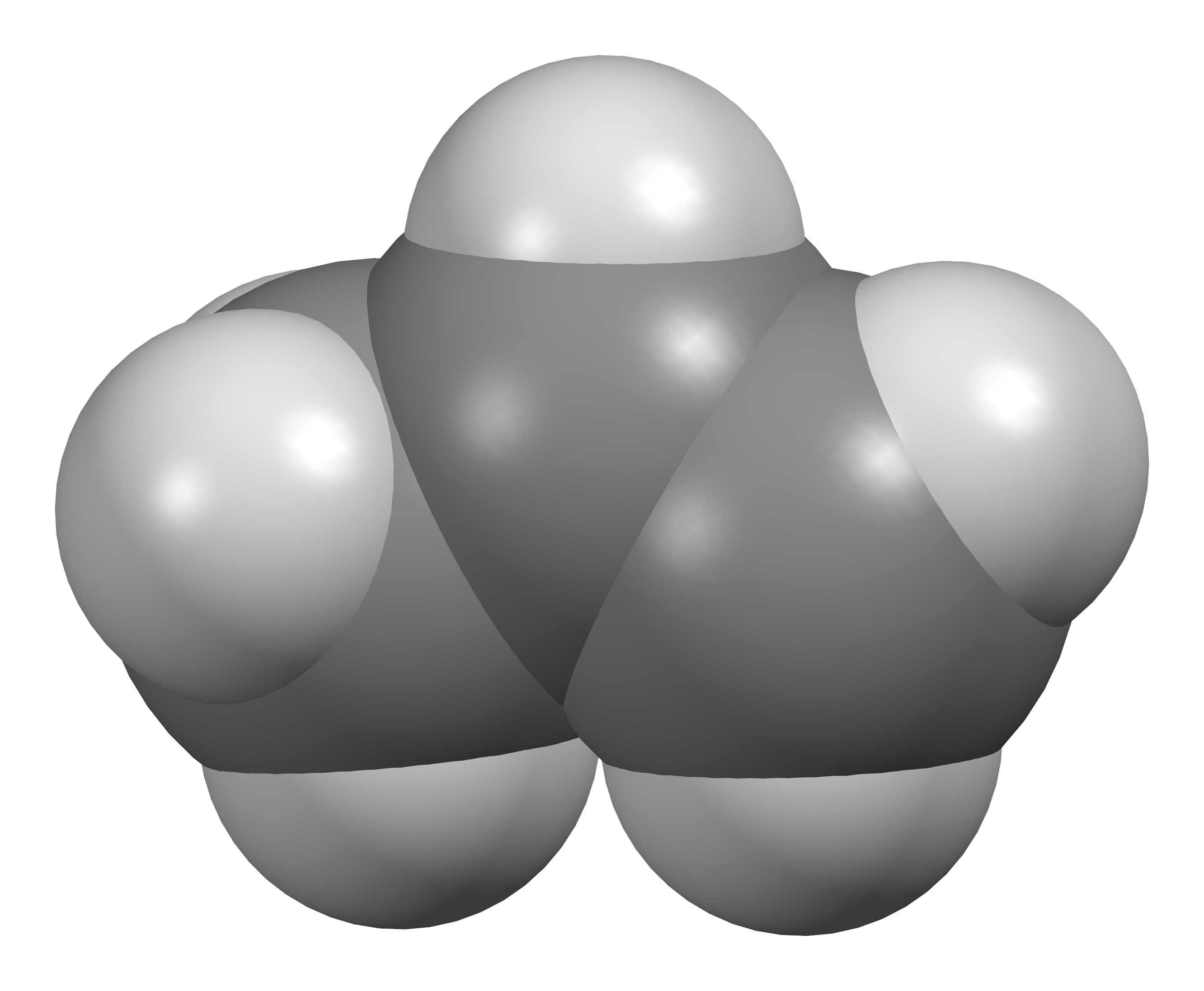

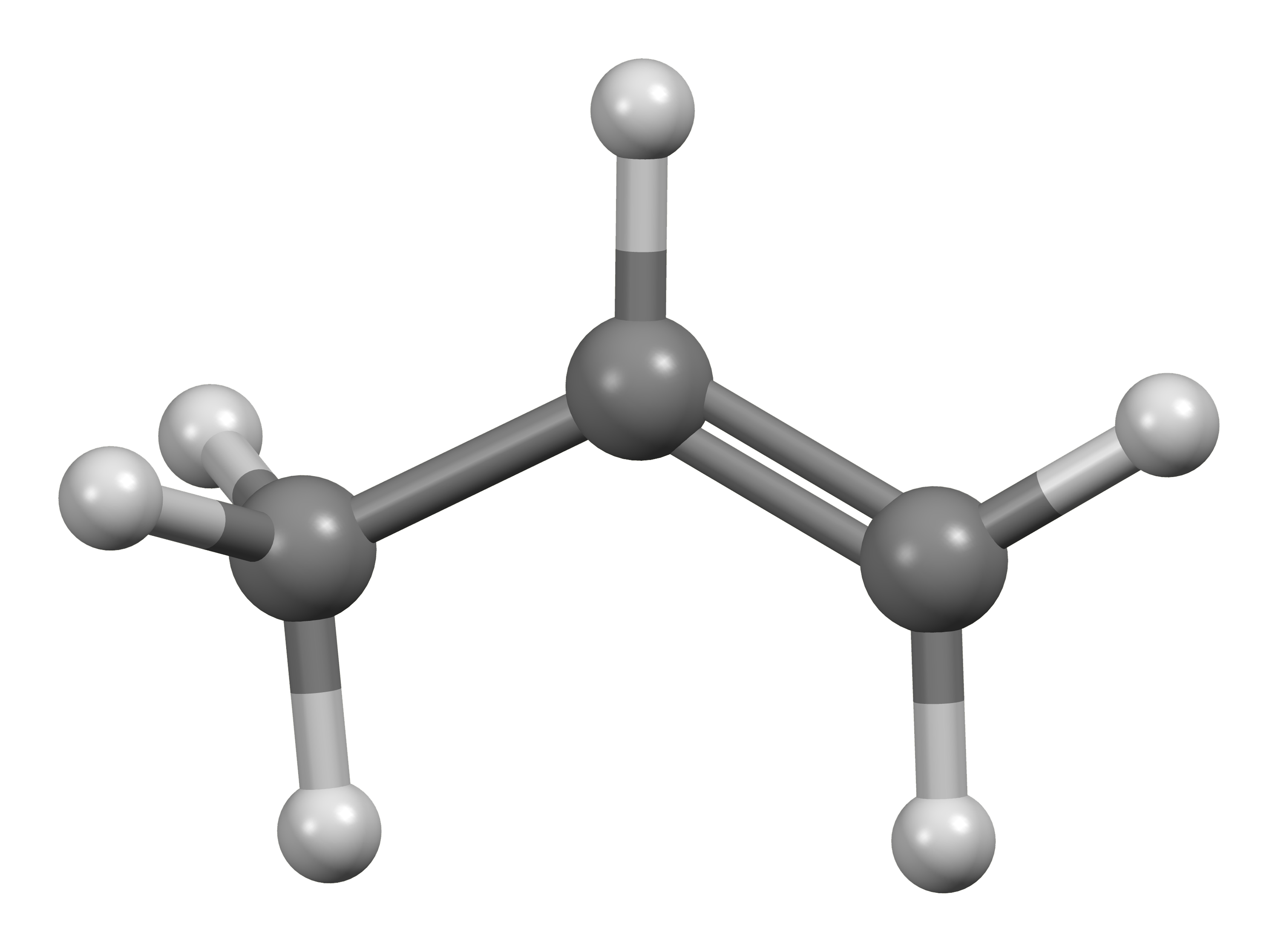
Propylene

Names
- Preferred IUPAC name Propene

Identifiers
CAS Number	115-07-1
3D model (JSmol)	Interactive image; Interactive image
Beilstein Reference	1696878
ChEBI	CHEBI:16052
ChEMBL	ChEMBL117213
ChemSpider	7954
ECHA InfoCard	100.003.693
EC Number	204-062-1
Gmelin Reference	852
KEGG	C11505
PubChem CID	8252
RTECS number	UC6740000
UNII	AUG1H506LY
UN number	1077; In Liquefied petroleum gas: 1075
CompTox Dashboard (EPA)	DTXSID5021205
- InChI: InChI=1S/C3H6/c1-3-2/h3H,1H2,2H3 Key: QQONPFPTGQHPMA-UHFFFAOYSA-N; InChI=1/C3H6/c1-3-2/h3H,1H2,2H3 Key: QQONPFPTGQHPMA-UHFFFAOYAA
- SMILES: C=CC; CC=C

Properties
Chemical formula	C_{3}H_{6}
Molar mass	42.081 g·mol^{−1}
Appearance	Colorless gas
Density	1.81 kg/m^{3}, gas (1.013 bar, 15 °C); 1.745 kg/m^{3}, gas (1.013 bar, 25 °C); 613.9 kg/m^{3}, liquid
Melting point	−185.2 °C (−301.4 °F; 88.0 K)
Boiling point	−47.6 °C (−53.7 °F; 225.6 K)
Solubility in water	0.61 g/m^{3}
Magnetic susceptibility (χ)	−31.5·10^{−6} cm^{3}/mol
Viscosity	8.34 µPa·s at 16.7 °C

Structure
Dipole moment	0.366 D (gas)

Hazards
- GHS labelling
Pictograms	(GHS02: Flammable)
Signal word	Danger
Hazard statements	H220
Precautionary statements	P210, P377, P381, P403
NFPA 704 (fire diamond)	1 4 1
Flash point	−108 °C (−162 °F; 165 K)
Safety data sheet (SDS)	External MSDS

Related compounds
Related alkenes; related groups	Ethylene, Isomers of Butylene; Allyl, Propenyl
Related compounds	Propane, Propyne; Propadiene, 1-Propanol; 2-Propanol
- Except where otherwise noted, data are given for materials in their standard state (at 25 °C [77 °F], 100 kPa). verify (what is ?) Infobox references

Propylene, also known as propene, is an unsaturated organic compound with the chemical formula CH_{3}CH=CH_{2}. It has one double bond, and is the second simplest member of the alkene class of hydrocarbons. It is a colorless gas with a faint petroleum-like odor. Propylene was discovered in 1850 by A. W. von Hofmann's student John Williams Reynolds as the only gaseous product of thermal decomposition of amyl alcohol to react with chlorine and bromine. The majority of propylene, which is produced on the scale of many millions of tonnes annually, is used for the production of polypropylene.

== Production ==
=== Steam cracking ===
The dominant technology for producing propylene is steam cracking of naphtha (C5-C10 hydrocarbons). The yield of propylene from naphtha is about 15%. Especially in North America, propane is a common feedstock. Refinery grade propylene can be separated by fractional distillation from the hydrocarbon mixtures obtained from cracking and other refining processes.

=== Olefin conversion technology (OCT) ===
In the Phillips triolefin process, propylene is converted to ethylene and 2-butenes. Tungsten-based catalysts are used. The Lummus OCT runs the reverse reaction:

CH_{2}=CH_{2} + CH_{3}CH=CHCH_{3} → 2 CH_{2}=CHCH_{3}

The catalyst is poisoned by coke deposition induced by butadiene impurities.

Both processes are based on the olefin metathesis reaction discovered at Phillips Petroleum Company. Propylene selectivity of about 90% is achieved.

=== From methanol ===
Especially in China, where coal is abundant, propylene is made from methanol via coal-derived syngas. Called methanol to propylene (MTP), the technology is only economical at large scale. Syngas is converted to methanol, which is in turn converted to alkenes in the presence of zeolite-based catalysts.

=== Fluid catalytic cracking ===
High severity fluid catalytic cracking (FCC) uses traditional FCC technology under severe conditions (higher catalyst-to-oil ratios, higher steam injection rates, higher temperatures, etc.) in order to maximize the amount of propene and other light products. A high severity FCC unit is usually fed with gas oils (paraffins) and residues, and produces about 20–25% (by mass) of propylene on feedstock together with greater volumes of motor gasoline and distillate byproducts. This high temperature process is expensive and has a high carbon footprint. For these reasons, alternative routes to propylene continue to attract attention.

=== Olefin cracking ===
In olefin cracking, the feed is C4–C8 olefins. Some named technologies are Superflex, Omega Process, Olefin Conversion Process (OCP).

=== Dehydrogenation ===
Propylene is often made "on purpose" by dehydrogenation of propane. The process is conducted at high temperatures in the presence of metallic or metal oxide catalysts:

CH_{3}CH_{2}CH_{3} → CH_{3}CH=CH_{2} + H_{2}

Some named technologies include Oleflex (Pt-based), Catofin (Cr-based), and Linde (Pt-based). Whereas PDH (propane dehydrogenation) is endothermic, the corresponding oxidative dehydrogenation (ODH) is exothermic. In ODH, oxygen is fed into the reactor to consume the hydrogen. The idealized stoichiometry is:

2 CH_{3}CH_{2}CH_{3} + O_{2} → 2 CH_{3}CH=CH_{2} + 2 H_{2}O

A significant problem with this method is the over-oxidation (or combustion) of the propylene.

=== Emerging technologies: green propylene ===
The production of "green propylene" from renewables has been of intermittent interest. In one approach, glycerol, a byproduct from biodiesel production, is the precursor:

HOCH_{2}CH(OH)CH_{2}OH + 2 H_{2} → CH_{2}=CHCH_{3} + 3 H_{2}O

== Reactions ==
In terms of its reactivity, propylene resembles other alkenes. Many such reactions are discussed in the Uses section.

Foundational to hydroformylation and polymerization are metal-propylene complexes, which are intermediates in these processes. Propylene is prochiral, meaning that its complexation yields enantiomers. The enantioselectivity of this binding influences the tacticity of polypropylene produced by polymerization, for example.

== Uses ==
=== Polymerization and oligomerization ===
The majority of propylene is used to form polypropylene, a very important commodity thermoplastic, through chain-growth polymerization:

n CH_{3}CH=CH_{2} → (−C(CH_{3})H−CH_{2}−)_{n}

Propylene is the second most important starting product in the petrochemical industry after ethylene. Polypropylene end uses include films, fibers, containers, packaging, and caps and closures. The polymerization requires catalyst (typically a Ziegler–Natta catalyst). There are multiple ways to achieve this, such as using high pressures to suspend the catalyst in a solution of liquid propylene, or running gaseous propylene through a fluidized bed reactor.

In the presence of suitable catalysts, propylene also forms various oligomers. It can dimerise to give 2,3-dimethyl-1-butene and/or 2,3-dimethyl-2-butene. or trimerise to form tripropylene.

=== Chemical precursor ===
Propylene is used for the production of a variety of C3-chemicals such as propylene oxide, acrylonitrile, isopropyl alcohol (propan-2-ol), and epichlorohydrin. The industrial production of acrolein involves the catalytic partial oxidation of propylene. Acrolein is an intermediate in the oxidation of propylene to acrylic acid.

Hydroformylation of propylene is a mature and significant technology, yielding C4-products. Two isomers of butyraldehyde are produced.

Propylene and benzene combine in the presence of solid acid catalysts to give isopropyl benzene (cumene). In turn, via the cumene process, the cumene is a precursor to phenol and acetone.

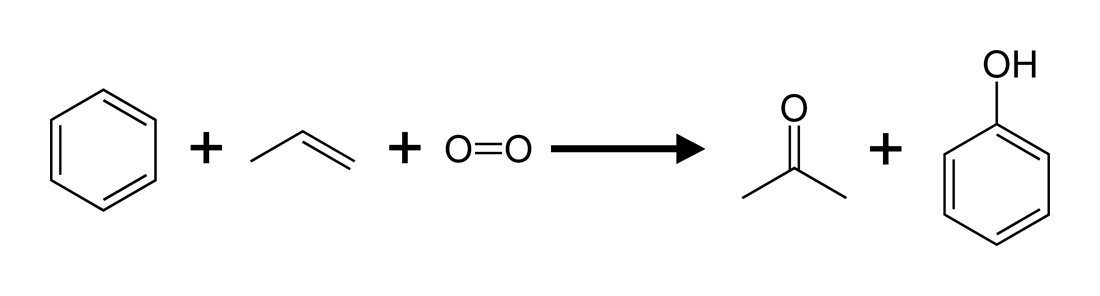
Overview of the cumene process

=== Fuel ===
In industry and workshops, propylene is used as an alternative fuel to acetylene in Oxy-fuel welding and cutting, brazing and heating of metal for the purpose of bending. It has become a standard in BernzOmatic products and others in MAPP substitutes, now that true MAPP gas is no longer available.

== Safety ==
In the United States and some European countries a threshold limit value of 500 parts per million (ppm) was established for occupational (8-hour time-weighted average) exposure. It is considered a volatile organic compound (VOC) and emissions are regulated by many governments, but it is not listed by the U.S. Environmental Protection Agency (EPA) as a hazardous air pollutant under the Clean Air Act. With a relatively short half-life, it is not expected to bioaccumulate.

Propene has low acute toxicity from inhalation and is not considered to be carcinogenic. Chronic toxicity studies in mice did not yield significant evidence suggesting adverse effects. Humans briefly exposed to 4,000 ppm did not experience any noticeable effects. Propene is dangerous from its potential to displace oxygen as an asphyxiant gas, and from its high flammability/explosion risk.

== Handling ==
Propylene is typically stored in spherical tanks at room temperature under pressure. It is transported by tank cars and trucks. Three grades of the gas are of interest: refinery, chemical, and polymer grades. Refinery-grade propene is about 50 to 70% propylene. The chemical grade (92-95% purity) is used to make other chemicals, e.g. acrylonitrile. Polymer-grade propylene, which is the majority of production, has purity >99.5%, as demanded by the sensitivity of the catalysts.

== Occurrence in nature ==
Propene is a product of combustion from forest fires, cigarette smoke, and motor vehicle and aircraft exhaust. It is an impurity in some heating gases. Observed concentrations have been in the range of 0.1–4.8 parts per billion (ppb) in rural air, 4–10.5 ppb in urban air, and 7–260 ppb in industrial air samples.

Propene has been detected in the interstellar medium using microwave spectroscopy. It was also detected in the stratosphere of Titan by infrared spectroscopy from the Cassini orbiter.

== See also ==
- Los Alfaques disaster
- 2014 Kaohsiung gas explosions
- 2020 Houston explosion
- Titan (moon)
