= MAPP gas =

Fuel gas based on a stabilized mixture of methylacetylene and propadiene

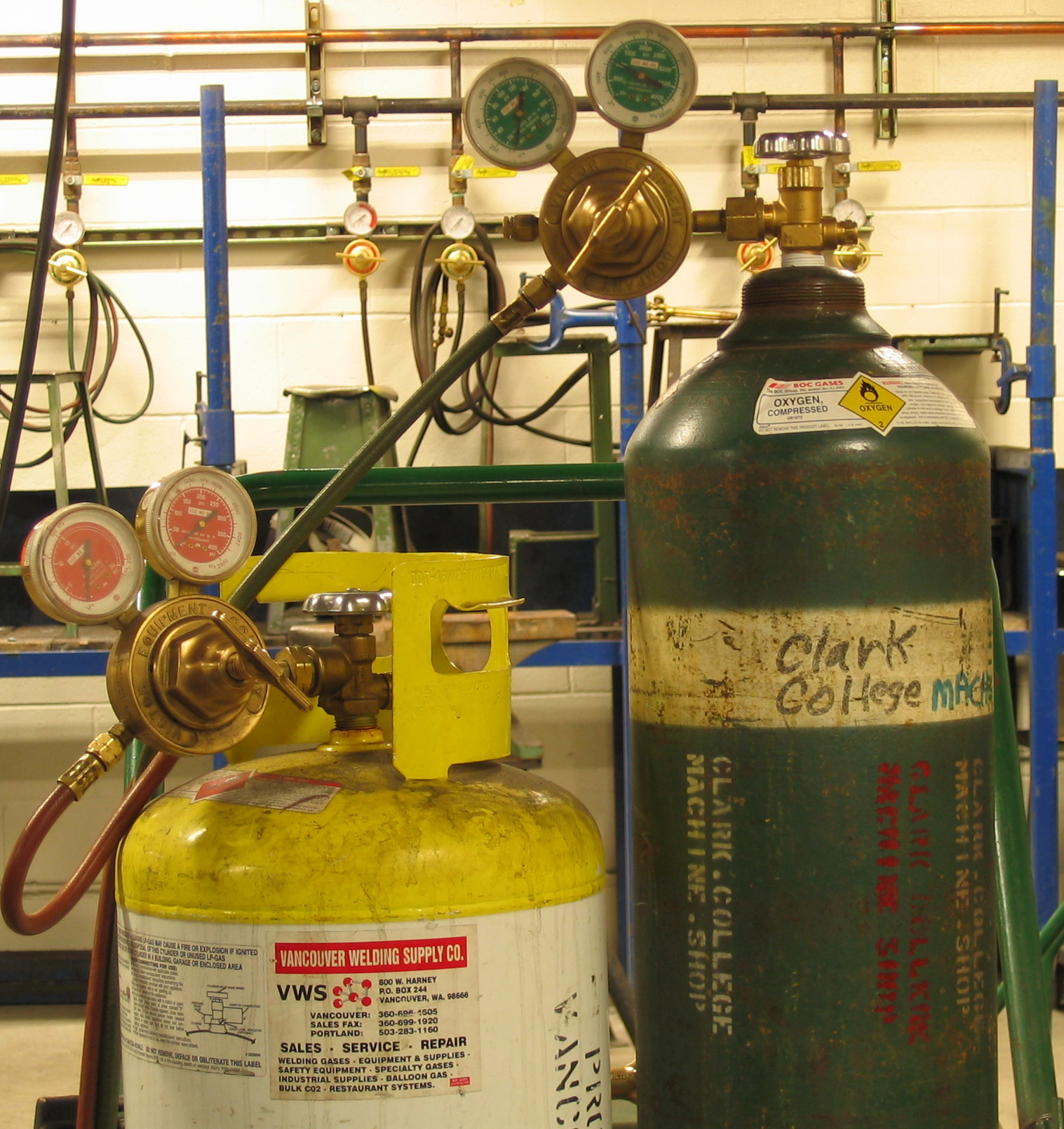
A set of MAPP and oxygen cylinders is used for oxy-fuel welding and cutting.

MAPP gas was a trademarked name (belonging to The Linde Group, a division of the former global chemical giant Union Carbide) for a fuel gas based on a stabilized mixture of methylacetylene (propyne), propadiene and propane. The name comes from the original chemical composition, methylacetylene-propadiene propane. "MAPP gas" is also widely used as a generic name for UN 1060 stabilised methylacetylene-propadiene (unstabilised methylacetylene-propadiene is known as MAPD).

MAPP gas was widely regarded as a safer and easier-to-use substitute for acetylene, but its production was discontinued early in 2008 at the only remaining plant in North America that still manufactured it. However, there are many MAPP substitutes on the market, often labeled "MAPP", "MAP-X" or "MAP-Plus", which contain mostly propylene with some propane (and, in some cases, dimethyl ether).

== Use ==
Its high flame temperature of 2925 °C (5300 °F) allowed genuine MAPP gas to be used in combination with oxygen for heating, soldering, brazing, and even welding. Although acetylene has a higher flame temperature (3160 °C, 5720 °F), MAPP requires neither dilution nor special container fillers during transport, allowing a greater volume of fuel gas to be transported at the same given weight; it is also much safer in use.

A MAPP/oxygen flame is not entirely appropriate for welding steel, due to the high concentration of hydrogen in the flame, which is higher than acetylene, but lower than any of the other petroleum fuel gases. The hydrogen infuses into the molten steel, rendering the welds brittle. For small-scale welding with MAPP gas, this is not a serious problem, as the hydrogen escapes readily, and MAPP/oxygen can, in practice, be used for welding small steel parts.

MAPP/oxygen was advantageously used in underwater cutting, which requires high gas pressures (under such pressures, acetylene can decompose explosively, making it dangerous to use). However, underwater oxy/fuel gas cutting of any kind has been largely replaced by exothermic cutting because of its relative safety and speed.

MAPP gas is also used in combustion with air for brazing and soldering, where it has a slight advantage over competing propane fuel because of its higher combustion temperature of 2,020 °C (3,670 °F) in air.

The biggest disadvantage of MAPP gas is cost: it is typically one-and-a-half times as expensive as propane at the refinery, and up to four times as expensive to the consumer. It is no longer used much in large-scale industry, as acetylene/oxygen is more economical than MAPP/oxygen for applications that require high flame temperatures, and propane/air is more economical when big overall heating is needed.

For small-scale users, however, a MAPP/oxygen flame is still highly desirable, having higher temperatures and energy densities than any flame other than acetylene/oxygen, while avoiding the dangers and inconveniences of that combination. Jewelers, glass bead makers, and hobbyists often find it very useful. Refrigeration and HVAC engineers, plumbers, and other tradesmen also value the high heat capacity of the MAPP/air flame. MAPP was widely used until recently, and was available in small to medium-size containers.

Blowtorches are used to brown and sear food cooked by low-temperature sous-vide techniques. Myhrvold recommends in Modernist Cuisine: The Art and Science of Cooking that MAPP gases should be used in preference to cheaper butane or propane as they produce higher temperatures with less risk of giving the food a gas flavour, as can happen with incompletely combusted gas.

== Physical properties ==
MAPP is colorless in both liquid and gas form. The gas has a pronounced acetylene-like or fishy odor at concentrations above 100 ppm, due to the addition of substituted amines as a polymerization inhibitor. Low molecular weight alkynes have strong odors. MAPP gas is toxic if inhaled at high concentrations.

The composition of the supplied gas has varied widely, with the gases as supplied by different repackagers/resellers at any one time varying, as well as the general composition varying over time, but a typical composition for an early Dow gas might be: 48% methylacetylene (propyne), 23% propadiene, and 27% propane. For a later Dow/Petromont gas, a mixture of 30% propyne, 14% propadiene, 43% propylene, 7% propane, and 6% C_{4}H_{10} (isobutane, butane) might be more typical.

== Thermal properties ==
MAPP has an energy content of 21000 BTU/lb (13.57 kWh/kg) while acetylene's energy content is 25000 BTU/lb (16.15 kWh/kg).

== Safety ==
People can be exposed to MAPP gas or its substitutes in the workplace by inhaling the gas or skin/eye contact with the liquid. The Occupational Safety and Health Administration (OSHA) has set the legal limit for MAPP gas exposure in the workplace as 1000 ppm (1800 mg/m^{3}) over an 8-hour workday. The National Institute for Occupational Safety and Health (NIOSH) has set a recommended exposure limit (REL) of 1000 ppm (1800 mg/m^{3}) over an 8-hour workday and 1250 ppm (2250 mg/m^{3}) for short-term exposure. At levels of 3400 ppm, 10% of the lower explosive limit, MAPP gas is immediately dangerous to life and health.

== See also ==
- Methylacetylene-propadiene gas (MPS gas)
- Brazing – Metal-joining technique
- Oxy–fuel welding and cutting – Metalworking technique using a fuel and oxygen
- Forge welding – Method of joining metal pieces
- Arc welding – Welding process
