= Propadiene =

Organic compound (H2C=C=CH2)

Stereo structural formula of propadiene with explicit hydrogens
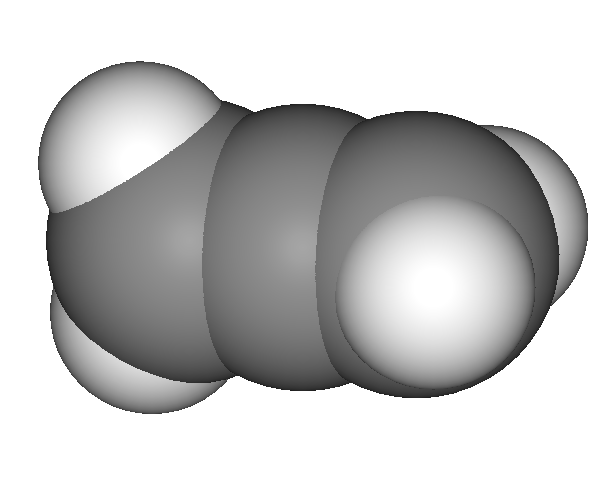
Spacefill model of propadiene
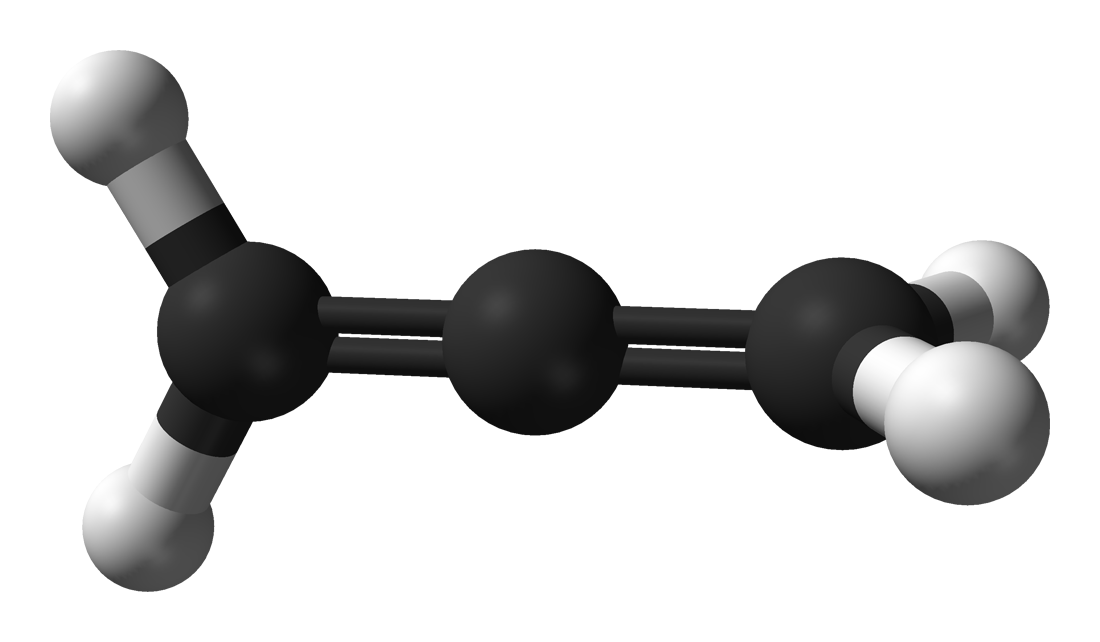
- Ball and stick model of propadiene

Names
- IUPAC name Allene
- Preferred IUPAC name Propa-1,2-diene
- Systematic IUPAC name Propadiene

Identifiers
CAS Number	463-49-0
3D model (JSmol)	Interactive image
Beilstein Reference	1730774
ChEBI	CHEBI:37601
ChEMBL	ChEMBL116960
ChemSpider	9642
ECHA InfoCard	100.006.670
EC Number	207-335-3
Gmelin Reference	860
MeSH	Propadiene
PubChem CID	10037
UNII	4AV0LZ8QKB
UN number	2200
CompTox Dashboard (EPA)	DTXSID1029178
- InChI: InChI=1S/C3H4/c1-3-2/h1-2H2 Key: IYABWNGZIDDRAK-UHFFFAOYSA-N
- SMILES: C=C=C

Properties
Chemical formula	C_{3}H_{4}
Molar mass	40.065 g·mol^{−1}
Appearance	Colorless gas
Melting point	−136 °C (−213 °F; 137 K)
Boiling point	−34 °C (−29 °F; 239 K)
log P	1.45

Hazards
- GHS labelling
Pictograms	(GHS02: Flammable)
Signal word	Danger
Hazard statements	H220
Precautionary statements	P210, P377, P381, P410+P403
NFPA 704 (fire diamond)	0 4 3
Explosive limits	13%
Safety data sheet (SDS)	External MSDS
- Except where otherwise noted, data are given for materials in their standard state (at 25 °C [77 °F], 100 kPa). verify (what is ?) Infobox references

Propadiene (/ˌproʊpəˈdaɪiːn/ PROH-pə-DY-een) or allene (/ˈæliːn/ AL-een) is the organic compound with the formula H_{2}C=C=CH_{2}. It is the simplest allene, i.e. a compound with two adjacent carbon double bonds. As a constituent of MAPP gas, it has been used as a fuel for specialized welding.

== Production and equilibrium with methylacetylene ==
Propadiene exists in equilibrium with methylacetylene (propyne) and the mixture is sometimes called MAPD for methylacetylene-propadiene:

H_{3}C−C≡CH ⇌ H_{2}C=C=CH_{2}

for which K_{eq} = 0.22 at 270 °C or 0.1 at 5 °C.

MAPD is produced as a side product, often an undesirable one, of dehydrogenation of propane to produce propene, an important feedstock in the chemical industry. MAPD interferes with the catalytic polymerization of propene.

== Occurrence in space ==
In 2019 it was announced that propadiene had been detected in the atmosphere of Saturn's moon Titan using the NASA Infrared Telescope Facility. This was the first time that propadiene had been detected in space, and the second structural isomeric pair (paired with propyne) detected in Titan's atmosphere, after HCN-HNC.

== See also ==
- Butatriene
