= Propyne =

Alkyne hydrocarbon compound with three carbon atoms

- Methylacetylene

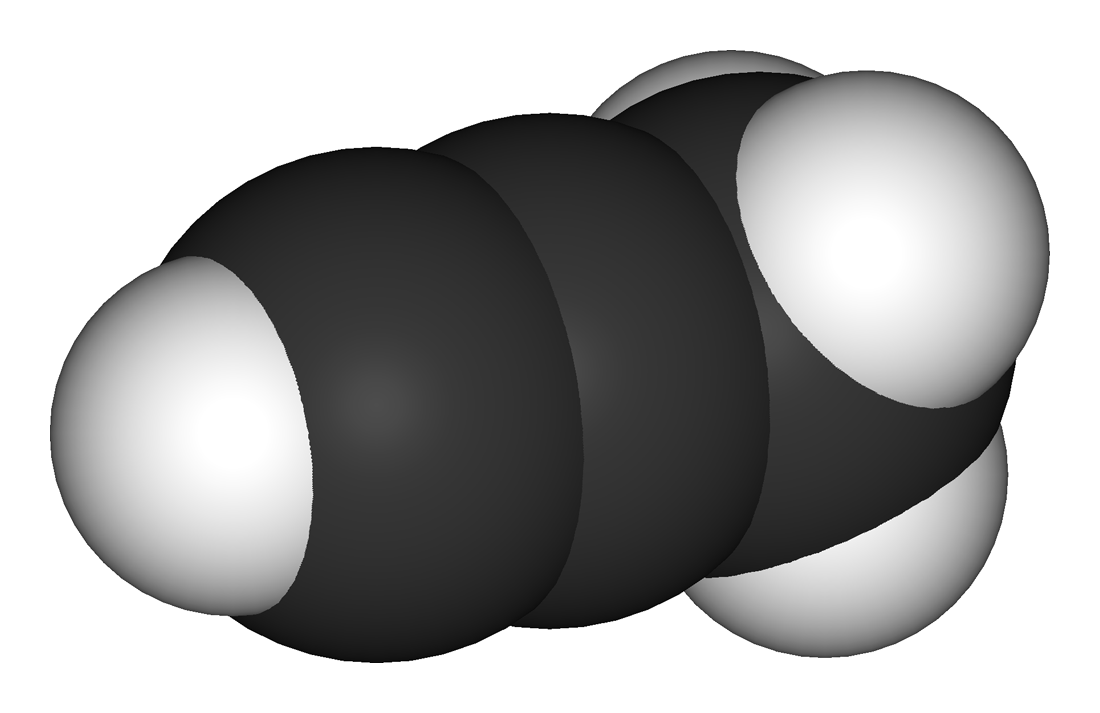

Names
- Preferred IUPAC name Propyne (Note: "Prop-1-yne" mistake fixed in the errata Archived 2019-08-01 at the Wayback Machine. The locant is omitted according to P-14.3.4.2 (d), p. 31 for propene and P-31.1.1.1, Examples, p. 374 for propyne.)
- Other names Methylacetylene; Methyl acetylene Allylyne

Identifiers
CAS Number	74-99-7
3D model (JSmol)	Interactive image
Beilstein Reference	878138
ChEBI	CHEBI:48086
ChEMBL	ChEMBL116902
ChemSpider	6095
ECHA InfoCard	100.000.754
EC Number	200-828-4
MeSH	C022030
PubChem CID	6335
UNII	086L40ET1B
CompTox Dashboard (EPA)	DTXSID0026387
- InChI: InChI=1S/C3H4/c1-3-2/h1H,2H3 Key: MWWATHDPGQKSAR-UHFFFAOYSA-N; InChI=1/C3H4/c1-3-2/h1H,2H3 Key: MWWATHDPGQKSAR-UHFFFAOYAI
- SMILES: CC#C

Properties
Chemical formula	CH_{3}C≡CH
Molar mass	40.0639 g/mol
Appearance	Colorless gas
Odor	Sweet
Density	0.53 g/cm^{3}
Melting point	−102.7 °C (−152.9 °F; 170.5 K)
Boiling point	−23.2 °C (−9.8 °F; 250.0 K)
log P	0.94
Vapor pressure	5.2 atm (20 °C)
Refractive index (n_{D})	1.3863 at -40 °C
Viscosity	8.4×10^{-3} mPa-s (gas at 298 K); 0.26 mPa-s (liquid at 233 K)

Hazards
- GHS labelling
Pictograms	(GHS02: Flammable) (GHS04: Compressed Gas) (GHS07: Exclamation mark)
Signal word	Danger
Hazard statements	H220, H280, H335, H336
Precautionary statements	P203, P210, P222, P261, P271, P280, P304+P340, P319, P377, P381, P403, P403+P233, P405, P410+P403, P501
NFPA 704 (fire diamond)	1 4 3
Explosive limits	1.7–11.7%
- NIOSH (US health exposure limits)
PEL (Permissible)	TWA 1000 ppm (1650 mg/m^{3})
REL (Recommended)	TWA 1000 ppm (1650 mg/m^{3})
IDLH (Immediate danger)	1700 ppm
- Except where otherwise noted, data are given for materials in their standard state (at 25 °C [77 °F], 100 kPa). verify (what is ?) Infobox references

Propyne (methylacetylene) is an alkyne with the chemical formula CH_{3}C≡CH. It is a component of MAPD gas—along with its isomer propadiene (allene), which was commonly used in gas welding. Unlike acetylene, propyne can be safely condensed.

== Production and equilibrium with propadiene ==
Propyne exists in equilibrium with propadiene, the mixture of propyne and propadiene being called MAPD:

H_{3}C−C≡CH ⇌ H_{2}C=C=CH_{2}

The coefficient of equilibrium K_{eq} is 0.22 at 270 °C or 0.1 at 5 °C. MAPD is produced as a side product, often an undesirable one, by cracking propane to produce propene, an important feedstock in the chemical industry. MAPD interferes with the catalytic polymerization of propene.

=== Laboratory methods ===
Propyne can also be synthesized on laboratory scale by reducing 1-propanol, allyl alcohol or acetone vapors over magnesium.

== Use as a rocket fuel ==
European space companies have researched using light hydrocarbons with liquid oxygen, a relatively high performing liquid rocket propellant combination that would also be less toxic than the commonly used MMH/NTO (monomethylhydrazine/nitrogen tetroxide). Their research showed that propyne would be highly advantageous as a rocket fuel for craft intended for low Earth orbital operations. They reached this conclusion based upon a specific impulse expected to reach 370 s with oxygen as the oxidizer, a high density and power density—and the moderate boiling point, which makes the chemical easier to store than cryogenic fuels that must be kept at extremely low temperatures.

== Organic chemistry ==
Propyne is a convenient three-carbon building block for organic synthesis. Deprotonation with n-butyllithium gives propynyllithium. This nucleophilic reagent adds to carbonyl groups, producing alcohols and esters. Whereas purified propyne is expensive, MAPP gas could be used to cheaply generate large amounts of the reagent.

Propyne, along with 2-butyne, is also used to synthesize alkylated hydroquinones in the total synthesis of vitamin E.

The chemical shift of an alkynyl proton and propargylic proton generally occur in the same region of the ^{1}H NMR spectrum. In propyne, these two signals have almost exactly the same chemical shifts, leading to overlap of the signals, and the ^{1}H NMR spectrum of propyne, when recorded in deuteriochloroform on a 300 MHz instrument, consists of a single signal, a sharp singlet resonating at 1.8 ppm.

== In astrophysics ==
Propyne has been detected in multiple astrophysical objects following its first observation in 1973 in the galactic center giant molecular cloud Sgr B2 using radio astronomy techniques. Propyne has been proposed to act as a precursor molecule to the formation of PAHs in space, such as indene.

Propyne has been detected by infrared spectroscopy in the chemically reducing atmospheres of the outer planets in the Solar System, including on Jupiter in 2000 and on Saturn in 1997, both using the Infrared Space Observatory; on Titan in 1981 using Voyager's IRIS instrument; and on the ice giants Uranus in 2006 and on Neptune in 2008 using the Spitzer space telescope.
