= C4H8 =

The molecular formula C_{4}H_{8} (molar mass: 56.11 g/mol) may refer to:

- Butenes (butylenes)
  - 1-Butene, or 1-butylene
  - 2-Butene
  - Isobutylene
- Cyclobutane
- Methylcyclopropane
