= Heat of combustion =

Amount of heat released by combustion of a quantity of substance

The heating value (or energy value, calorific value, heat of combustion) of a substance, usually a fuel or food (see food energy), is the amount of heat released during the combustion of a specified amount of it. The enthalpy of combustion is the same value expressed as an enthalpy, where release of heat is described as negative number.

The calorific value is the total energy released as heat when a substance undergoes complete combustion with oxygen under standard conditions. The chemical reaction is typically a hydrocarbon or other organic molecule reacting with oxygen to form carbon dioxide and water and release heat. It may be expressed with the quantities:

- energy/mole of fuel
- energy/mass of fuel
- energy/volume of the fuel

There are two kinds of heating values, called high(er) and low(er), depending on how much the products are allowed to cool and whether compounds like H_{2}O are allowed to condense. The high heat values are conventionally measured with a bomb calorimeter. Low heat values are calculated from high heat value test data. They may also be calculated as the difference between the standard enthalpies/heats of formation Δ_{f}H^{⦵} of the products and reactants (though this approach is somewhat artificial since most heats of formation are typically calculated from measured heats of combustion).

By convention, the (higher) heat of combustion is defined to be the heat released for the complete combustion of a compound in its standard state to form stable products in their standard states: hydrogen is converted to water (in its liquid state), carbon is converted to carbon dioxide gas, and nitrogen is converted to nitrogen gas. That is, the heat of combustion, Δ_{c}H^{⦵}, is the heat of reaction of the following process:

C_{c}H_{h}N_{n}O_{o}(std.) + (c + h/4 - o/2) O_{2}(g) → c CO_{2}(g) + h/2 H_{2}O(l) + n/2 N_{2}(g)

Chlorine and sulfur are not quite standardized; they are usually assumed to convert to hydrogen chloride gas and SO_{2} or SO_{3} gas, respectively, or to dilute aqueous hydrochloric and sulfuric acids, respectively, when the combustion is conducted in a bomb calorimeter containing some quantity of water.

== Definitions ==
=== Higher heating value ===
The higher heating value (HHV; gross energy, upper heating value, gross calorific value GCV, or higher calorific value; HCV) indicates the upper limit of the available thermal energy produced by a complete combustion of fuel. It is measured as a unit of energy per unit mass or volume of substance. The HHV is determined by bringing all the products of combustion back to the original pre-combustion temperature, including condensing any vapor produced. Such measurements often use a standard temperature of 25 °C (77 °F; 298 K). This is the same as the thermodynamic heat of combustion since the enthalpy change for the reaction assumes a common temperature of the compounds before and after combustion, in which case the water produced by combustion is condensed to a liquid. The higher heating value takes into account the latent heat of vaporization of water in the combustion products, and is useful in calculating heating values for fuels where condensation of the reaction products is practical (e.g., in a gas-fired boiler used for space heat).

The American Petroleum Institute (API) refers to the HHV at 25 °C (77 °F) as the standard heat of combustion, and the HHV at 60 °F (16 °C) as the gross heat of combustion. The two values are approximately equal.

When used as a "heating value", HHV assumes all the water component is in liquid state at the end of combustion (in product of combustion) and that all heat delivered at temperatures below 150 °C (302 °F) can be put to use.

=== Lower heating value ===
The lower heating value (LHV; net calorific value; NCV, or lower calorific value; LCV) is another measure of available thermal energy produced by a combustion of fuel, measured as a unit of energy per unit mass or volume of substance. In contrast to the HHV, the LHV considers energy losses such as the energy used to vaporize water – although its exact definition is not uniformly agreed upon.

Water-only LHV
One definition is simply to subtract the heat of vaporization of the produced water from the higher heating value. This treats any H_{2}O formed as a vapor that is released as a waste. The energy required to vaporize the water is therefore lost. It assume that the water component of a combustion process is in vapor state at the end of combustion, as opposed to the higher heating value (HHV) (a.k.a. gross calorific value or gross CV) which assumes that all of the water in a combustion process is in a liquid state after a combustion process.
GPSA LHV
This definition, used by Gas Processors Suppliers Association (GPSA), is the enthalpy of all combustion products minus the enthalpy of the fuel at the reference temperature (GPSA currently uses 60 °F (15 5/9 °C)), minus the enthalpy of the stoichiometric oxygen (O_{2}) at the reference temperature, minus the heat of vaporization of the vapor content of the combustion products.
It can be alternatively restated as the HHV at reference temperature minus the heat of vaporization of the vapor content of the combustion products. By specifying a reference temperature, all products can be taken into account.
This work is based on American Petroleum Institute (API) research project 44, which used 25 °C (77 °F) as the reference.
API LHV
The API defines a net heat of combustion to correspond to LHV. It uses the reference temperature of 60 °F (15 5/9 °C), but with gaseous water. It is calculated as the gross heat of combustion (HHV at reference temperature) subtracted by the heat of vaporization of water at reference temperature (and at the vapor pressure corresponding to reference temperature).
150 °C LHV
This LHV is the amount of heat released when the products are cooled to 150 °C (302 °F). This means that the latent heat of vaporization of water (and many other potential products) is not recovered. It is useful in comparing fuels where condensation of the combustion products is impractical, or heat at a temperature below 150 °C (302 °F) cannot be put to use.

The definition in which the combustion products are all returned to the reference temperature is more easily calculated from the higher heating value than when using other definitions. It will in fact give a slightly different answer.

=== Accounting for moisture ===
Both HHV and LHV can be expressed in terms of AR (all moisture counted), MF and MAF (only water from combustion of hydrogen). AR, MF, and MAF are commonly used for indicating the heating values of coal:

- AR (as received) indicates that the fuel heating value has been measured with all moisture- and ash-forming minerals present.
- MF (moisture-free) or dry indicates that the fuel heating value has been measured after the fuel has been dried of all inherent moisture but still retaining its ash-forming minerals.
- MAF (moisture- and ash-free) or DAF (dry and ash-free) indicates that the fuel heating value has been measured in the absence of inherent moisture- and ash-forming minerals.

==== Gross heating value ====
Gross heating value accounts for water in the exhaust leaving as vapor, as does LHV, but gross heating value also includes liquid water in the fuel prior to combustion. This value is important for fuels like wood or coal, which will usually contain some amount of water prior to burning.

=== End products for different elements ===
Zwolinski and Wilhoit defined, in 1972, "gross" and "net" values for heats of combustion. In the gross definition the products are the most stable compounds, e.g. H_{2}O(l), Br_{2}(l), I_{2}(s) and H_{2}SO_{4}(l). In the net definition the products are the gases produced when the compound is burned in an open flame, e.g. H_{2}O(g), Br_{2}(g), I_{2}(g) and SO_{2}(g). In both definitions the products for C, F, Cl and N are CO_{2}(g), HF(g), Cl_{2}(g) and N_{2}(g), respectively.

There are many other definitions of "gross" and "net".

== Estimating heating values ==
=== By elemental composition ===
The heating value of a fuel can be estimated with the results of ultimate analysis of fuel, which provides for the percentages of each element by mass.

==== By oxygen consumption ====
For an organic fuel of composition C_{c}H_{h}O_{o}N_{n}, the (higher) heat of combustion is 438 kJ/mol × (c + 0.3 h − 0.5 o) usually to a good approximation (±3% for more than 500 organic compounds). This corresponds to 438 kJ/mol for each mole of O_{2} consumed. The accuracy of such a simplistic formula is due to the very high bond enthalpy of O_{2}, which renders other bond enthalpies largely irrelevant.

This estimate does not work well for inorganic fuels such as carbon monoxide. (Note: The oxygen-consumption formula estimates 209 kJ/mol for CO, compared to the actual Δ_{c}H^{⦵} of −283.0 kJ/mol.) It also works poorly for explosives such as nitroglycerin (Note: The oxygen-consumption formula estimates a nonsensical 0 kJ/mol for nitroglycerin, though it does not really combust.) and other substances containing high-energy functional groups such as nitro and azide groups.

==== Dulong's Formula ====
The heating value can be calculated using Dulong's Formula, which treats carbon, hydrogen, sulfur as combustible elements:

HHV [kJ/g] = 33.87 m_{C} + 122.3 (m_{H} − m_{O}/8) + 9.4 m_{S}

where m_{C}, m_{H}, m_{O} and m_{S} are the mass fractions of carbon, hydrogen, oxygen, and sulfur on any (wet, dry or ash free) basis, respectively.

There are many modifications of the formula using different weighing terms. Some estimate the LHV instead of the HHV. A comparison of these formulas is available in Hokosai et al. (2016).

The API publishes its own Dulong-style formulas for petroleum liquids and synthetic fuels.

== Measuring heating values ==
The higher heating value is experimentally determined in a bomb calorimeter. The combustion of a stoichiometric mixture of fuel and oxidizer (e.g. two moles of hydrogen and one mole of oxygen) in a steel container at 25 °C (77 °F) is initiated by an ignition device and the reactions allowed to complete. When hydrogen and oxygen react during combustion, water vapor is produced. The vessel and its contents are then cooled to the original 25 °C and the higher heating value is determined as the heat released between identical initial and final temperatures.

When the lower heating value (LHV) is determined, cooling is stopped at 150 °C and the reaction heat is only partially recovered. The limit of 150 °C is based on acid gas dew-point.

Note: Higher heating value (HHV) is calculated with the product of water being in liquid form while lower heating value (LHV) is calculated with the product of water being in vapor form.

== Relation between heating values ==
The difference between the two heating values depends on the chemical composition of the fuel. In the case of pure carbon or carbon monoxide, the two heating values are almost identical, the difference being the sensible heat content of carbon dioxide between 150 °C and 25 °C (sensible heat exchange causes a change of temperature, while latent heat is added or subtracted for phase transitions at constant temperature. Examples: heat of vaporization or heat of fusion). For hydrogen, the difference is much more significant as it includes the sensible heat of water vapor between 150 °C and 100 °C, the latent heat of condensation at 100 °C, and the sensible heat of the condensed water between 100 °C and 25 °C. In all, the higher heating value of hydrogen is 18.2% above its lower heating value (142 MJ/kg vs. 120 MJ/kg). For hydrocarbons, the difference depends on the hydrogen content of the fuel. For gasoline and diesel the higher heating value exceeds the lower heating value by about 10% and 7%, respectively, and for natural gas about 11%.

A common method of relating HHV to LHV is:

$$\mathrm{HHV} = \mathrm{LHV} + H_\mathrm{v}\left(\frac{n_\mathrm{H_2O,out}}{n_\mathrm{fuel,in}}\right)$$

where H_{v} is the heat of vaporization of water at the datum temperature (typically 25 °C), n_{H_{2}O,out} is the number of moles of water vaporized and n_{fuel,in} is the number of moles of fuel combusted.

- Most applications that burn fuel produce water vapor, which is unused and thus wastes its heat content. In such applications, the lower heating value must be used to give a 'benchmark' for the process.
- However, for true energy calculations in some specific cases, the higher heating value is correct. This is particularly relevant for natural gas, whose high hydrogen content produces much water, when it is burned in condensing boilers and power plants with flue-gas condensation that condense the water vapor produced by combustion, recovering heat which would otherwise be wasted.

== Usage of terms ==
Engine manufacturers typically rate their engines fuel consumption by the lower heating values since the exhaust is never condensed in the engine, and doing this allows them to publish more attractive numbers than are used in conventional power plant terms. The conventional power industry had used HHV (high heat value) exclusively for decades, even though virtually all of these plants did not condense exhaust either. American consumers should be aware that the corresponding fuel-consumption figure based on the higher heating value will be somewhat higher.

The difference between HHV and LHV definitions causes endless confusion when quoters do not bother to state the convention being used. since there is typically a 10% difference between the two methods for a power plant burning natural gas. For simply benchmarking part of a reaction the LHV may be appropriate, but HHV should be used for overall energy efficiency calculations if only to avoid confusion, and in any case, the value or convention should be clearly stated.

== Heat of combustion tables ==
Higher (HHV) and lower (LHV) heating values of some common fuels at 25 °C
Fuel	HHV			LHV
Fuel	MJ/kg (Note: MJ/kg values are calculated from kJ/mol (Δ_{c}H^{⦵}/(molecular weight * M_{u}), M_{u} = 1.00000000105))	BTU/lb (Note: BTU/lb values are calculated from MJ/kg (1 MJ/kg = 430 BTU/lb))	kJ/mol	MJ/kg
Hydrogen	141.79	60969	285.83 (Note: Δ_{f}H^{⦵}, liquid phase))	119.96
Methane	55.52	23874	890.7	50.00
Ethane	51.90	22319	1560.7	47.62
Propane	50.33	21641	2219.2	46.35
Butane	49.51	21288	2877.5	45.75
Pentane	48.64	20913	3509 (Note: liquid phase)	45.35
Jet kerosene	46.42	19960		44.1
Kerosene	46.20	19866		43.00
Paraffin wax	46.00	19780		41.50
Diesel	44.80	19264		43.4
Coal (anthracite)	32.50	13975		
Wood (MAF)	21.70	9331		
Wood fuel	16.0	6880		17.0
Coal (lignite – USA)	15.00	6450		
Peat (dry)	15.00	6450		
Peat (damp)	6.00	2580		

Higher heating value of some less common fuels
Fuel	MJ/kg	BTU/lb	kJ/mol
Methanol	22.7	9,800	726
Ethanol	29.7	12,800	1,367
1-Propanol	33.6	14,500	2,020
Acetylene	49.9	21,500	1,300
Benzene	41.8	18,000	3,268
Ammonia	22.5	9,690	382.6
Hydrazine	19.4	8,370	622.0
Hexamine	30.0	12,900	4,200.0
Carbon	32.8	14,100	393.5

Lower heating value for some organic compounds (at 25 °C [77 °F])
Fuel	MJ/kg	MJ/L	BTU/lb	kJ/mol
Alkanes
Methane	50.009	6.9	21,504	802.34
Ethane	47.794	—	20,551	1,437.2
Propane	46.357	25.3	19,934	2,044.2
Butane	45.752	—	19,673	2,659.3
Pentane	45.357	28.39	21,706	3,272.6
Hexane	44.752	29.30	19,504	3,856.7
Heptane	44.566	30.48	19,163	4,465.8
Octane	44.427	—	19,104	5,074.9
Nonane	44.311	31.82	19,054	5,683.3
Decane	44.240	33.29	19,023	6,294.5
Undecane	44.194	32.70	19,003	6,908.0
Dodecane	44.147	33.11	18,983	7,519.6
Isoparaffins
Isobutane	45.613	—	19,614	2,651.0
Isopentane	45.241	27.87	19,454	3,264.1
2-Methylpentane	44.682	29.18	19,213	3,850.7
2,3-Dimethylbutane	44.659	29.56	19,203	3,848.7
2,3-Dimethylpentane	44.496	30.92	19,133	4,458.5
2,2,4-Trimethylpentane	44.310	30.49	19,053	5,061.5
Naphthenes
Cyclopentane	44.636	33.52	19,193	3,129.0
Methylcyclopentane	44.636?	33.43?	19,193?	3,756.6?
Cyclohexane	43.450	33.85	18,684	3,656.8
Methylcyclohexane	43.380	33.40	18,653	4,259.5
Monoolefins
Ethylene	47.195	—	—	—
Propylene	45.799	—	—	—
1-Butene	45.334	—	—	—
cis-2-Butene	45.194	—	—	—
trans-2-Butene	45.124	—	—	—
Isobutene	45.055	—	—	—
1-Pentene	45.031	—	—	—
2-Methyl-1-pentene	44.799	—	—	—
1-Hexene	44.426	—	—	—
Diolefins
1,3-Butadiene	44.613	—	—	—
Isoprene	44.078	-	—	—
Nitrous derived
Nitromethane	10.513	—	—	—
Nitropropane	20.693	—	—	—
Acetylenes
Acetylene	48.241	—	—	—
Methylacetylene	46.194	—	—	—
1-Butyne	45.590	—	—	—
1-Pentyne	45.217	—	—	—
Aromatics
Benzene	40.170	—	—	—
Toluene	40.589	—	—	—
o-Xylene	40.961	—	—	—
m-Xylene	40.961	—	—	—
p-Xylene	40.798	—	—	—
Ethylbenzene	40.938	—	—	—
1,2,4-Trimethylbenzene	40.984	—	—	—
n-Propylbenzene	41.193	—	—	—
Cumene	41.217	—	—	—
Alcohols
Methanol	19.930	15.78	8,570	638.6
Ethanol	26.70	22.77	12,412	1,230.1
1-Propanol	30.680	24.65	13,192	1,843.9
Isopropanol	30.447	23.93	13,092	1,829.9
n-Butanol	33.075	26.79	14,222	2,501.6
Isobutanol	32.959	26.43	14,172	2,442.9
tert-Butanol	32.587	25.45	14,012	2,415.3
n-Pentanol	34.727	28.28	14,933	3,061.2
Isoamyl alcohol	31.416?	35.64?	13,509?	2,769.3?
Ethers
Methoxymethane	28.703	—	12,342	1,322.3
Ethoxyethane	33.867	24.16	14,563	2,510.2
Propoxypropane	36.355	26.76	15,633	3,568.0
Butoxybutane	37.798	28.88	16,253	4,922.4
Aldehydes and ketones
Formaldehyde	17.259	—	—	570.78
Acetaldehyde	24.156	—	—	—
Propionaldehyde	28.889	—	—	—
Butyraldehyde	31.610	—	—	—
Acetone	28.548	22.62	—	—
Other species
Carbon (graphite)	32.808	—	—	—
Hydrogen	120.971	1.8	52,017	244
Carbon monoxide	10.112	—	4,348	283.24
Ammonia	18.646	—	8,018	317.56
Sulfur (solid)	9.163	—	3,940	293.82

Note

- There is no difference between the lower and higher heating values for the combustion of carbon, carbon monoxide and sulfur since no water is formed during the combustion of those substances.
- BTU/lb values are calculated from MJ/kg (1 MJ/kg = 430 BTU/lb).

=== Higher heating values of natural gases from various sources ===
The International Energy Agency reports the following typical higher heating values per Standard cubic metre of gas:

- Algeria: 39.57 MJ/Sm^{3}
- Bangladesh: 36.00 MJ/Sm^{3}
- Canada: 39.00 MJ/Sm^{3}
- China: 38.93 MJ/Sm^{3}
- Indonesia: 40.60 MJ/Sm^{3}
- Iran: 39.36 MJ/Sm^{3}
- Netherlands: 33.32 MJ/Sm^{3}
- Norway: 39.24 MJ/Sm^{3}
- Pakistan: 34.90 MJ/Sm^{3}
- Qatar: 41.40 MJ/Sm^{3}
- Russia: 38.23 MJ/Sm^{3}
- Saudi Arabia: 38.00 MJ/Sm^{3}
- Turkmenistan: 37.89 MJ/Sm^{3}
- United Kingdom: 39.71 MJ/Sm^{3}
- United States: 38.42 MJ/Sm^{3}
- Uzbekistan: 37.89 MJ/Sm^{3}

The lower heating value of natural gas is normally about 90% of its higher heating value. This table is in Standard cubic metres (1 atm, 15 °C), to convert to values per Normal cubic metre (1 atm, 0 °C), multiply above table by 1.0549.

== See also ==
- Adiabatic flame temperature
- Cost of electricity by source
- Electrical efficiency
- Energy content of fuel
- Energy conversion efficiency
- Energy density
- Energy value of coal
- Exothermic reaction
- Figure of merit
- Fire
- Food energy
- Internal energy
- ISO 15971
- Mechanical efficiency
- Thermal efficiency
- Wobbe index: heat density
