= List of UN numbers 1001 to 1100 =

UN numbers from UN1001 to UN1100 as assigned by the United Nations Committee of Experts on the Transport of Dangerous Goods are as follows:

== UN 1001 to UN 1100 ==
UN Number	Class	Proper Shipping Name
UN 1001	2.1	Acetylene, dissolved
UN 1002	2.2	Air, compressed
UN 1003	2.2	Air, refrigerated liquid, (cryogenic liquid)
UN 1003	2.2	Air, refrigerated liquid, (cryogenic liquid) non-pressurized
UN 1004	?	(UN No. no longer in use)
UN 1005	2.2	Ammonia, anhydrous
UN 1005	2.3	Ammonia, anhydrous
UN 1006	2.2	Argon, compressed
UN 1007	?	(UN No. no longer in use)
UN 1008	2.3	Boron trifluoride
UN 1009	2.2	Bromotrifluoromethane or Refrigerant gas, R 13B1.
UN 1010	2.1	Butadienes, stabilized or Butadienes and Hydrocarbon mixture, stabilized containing more than 40% butadienes
UN 1011	2.1	Butane see also Petroleum gases, liquefied
UN 1012	2.1	Butylene see also Petroleum gases, liquefied
UN 1013	2.2	Carbon dioxide
UN 1014	2	(UN No. no longer in use) Carbon dioxide and oxygen mixtures, compressed (UN No. no longer in use)
UN 1015	2	(UN No. no longer in use) Carbon dioxide and nitrous oxide mixtures (UN No. no longer in use)
UN 1016	2.3	Carbon monoxide, compressed
UN 1017	2.3	Chlorine
UN 1018	2.2	Chlorodifluoromethane or Refrigerant gas R 22
UN 1019	?	(UN No. no longer in use)
UN 1020	2.2	Chloropentafluoroethane or Refrigerant gas R 115
UN 1021	2.2	1-Chloro-1,2,2,2-tetrafluoroethane or Refrigerant gas R 124
UN 1022	2.2	Chlorotrifluoromethane or Refrigerant gas R 13
UN 1023	2.3	Coal gas, compressed
UN 1024 to 1025	?	(UN No.s no longer in use)
UN 1026	2.3	Cyanogen
UN 1027	2.1	Cyclopropane
UN 1028	2.2	Dichlorodifluoromethane or Refrigerant gas R 12
UN 1029	2.2	Dichlorofluoromethane or Refrigerant gas R 21
UN 1030	2.1	1,1-Difluoroethane or Refrigerant gas R 152a
UN 1031	?	(UN No. no longer in use)
UN 1032	2.1	Dimethylamine, anhydrous
UN 1033	2.1	Dimethyl ether
UN 1034	?	(UN No. no longer in use)
UN 1035	2.1	Ethane
UN 1036	2.1	Ethylamine
UN 1037	2.1	Ethyl chloride
UN 1038	2.1	Ethylene, refrigerated liquid (cryogenic liquid)
UN 1039	2.1	Ethyl methyl ether
UN 1040	2.3	Ethylene oxide or Ethylene oxide with nitrogen up to a total pressure of 1MPa (10 bar) at 50 °C
UN 1041	2.1	Ethylene oxide and carbon dioxide mixtures with more than 9 percent but not more than 87 percent ethylene oxide
UN 1042	?	(UN No. no longer in use)
UN 1043	2.2	Fertilizer ammoniating solution with free ammonia
UN 1044	2.2	Fire extinguishers containing compressed or liquefied gas
UN 1045	2.3	Fluorine, compressed
UN 1046	2.2	Helium, compressed
UN 1047	?	(UN No. no longer in use)
UN 1048	2.3	Hydrogen bromide, anhydrous
UN 1049	2.1	Hydrogen, compressed
UN 1050	2.3	Hydrogen chloride, anhydrous
UN 1051	6.1	Hydrogen cyanide, stabilized with less than 3 percent water
UN 1052	8	Hydrogen fluoride, anhydrous
UN 1053	2.3	Hydrogen sulfide
UN 1054	?	(UN No. no longer in use)
UN 1055	2.1	Isobutylene see also Petroleum gases, liquefied
UN 1056	2.2	Krypton, compressed
UN 1057	2.1	Lighters containing flammable gas
UN 1057	2.1	Lighter refills containing flammable gas not exceeding 4 fluid ounces (7.22 cubic inches) and 65 grams of flammable gas
UN 1058	2.2	Liquified gases, nonflammable charged with nitrogen, carbon dioxide, or air
UN 1059	?	(UN No. no longer in use)
UN 1060	2.1	Methyl acetylene and propadiene mixtures, stabilized
UN 1061	2.1	Methylamine, anhydrous
UN 1062	2.3	Methyl bromide
UN 1063	2.1	Methyl chloride, or Refrigerant gas R 40
UN 1064	2.3	Methyl mercaptan
UN 1065	2.2	Neon, compressed
UN 1066	2.2	Nitrogen, compressed
UN 1067	2.3	Dinitrogen tetroxide
UN 1068	?	(UN No. no longer in use)
UN 1069	2.3	Nitrosyl chloride
UN 1070	2.2	Nitrous oxide
UN 1071	2.3	Oil gas, compressed
UN 1072	2.2	Oxygen, compressed
UN 1073	2.2	Oxygen, refrigerated liquid (cryogenic liquid)
UN 1074	?	(UN No. no longer in use)
UN 1075	2.1	Petroleum gases, liquefied or Liquefied petroleum gas
UN 1076	2.3	Phosgene
UN 1077	2.1	Propylene see also Petroleum gases, liquefied
UN 1078	2.2	Refrigerant gases, n.o.s.
UN 1079	2.3	Sulfur dioxide
UN 1080	2.2	Sulfur hexafluoride
UN 1081	2.1	Tetrafluoroethylene, stabilized
UN 1082	2.3	Trifluorochloroethylene, stabilized or Refrigerant gas R 1113
UN 1083	2.1	Trimethylamine, anhydrous
UN 1084	?	(UN No. no longer in use)
UN 1085	2.1	Vinyl bromide, stabilized
UN 1086	2.1	Vinyl chloride, stabilized or Vinyl chloride, stabilized
UN 1087	2.1	Vinyl methyl ether, stabilized
UN 1088	3	Acetal
UN 1089	3	Acetaldehyde
UN 1090	3	Acetone
UN 1091	3	Acetone oils
UN 1092	6.1	Acrolein, stabilized
UN 1093	3	Acrylonitrile, stabilized
UN 1094 to 1097	?	(UN No.s no longer in use)
UN 1098	6.1	Allyl alcohol
UN 1099	3	Allyl bromide
UN 1100	3	Allyl chloride

n.o.s. = not otherwise specified meaning a collective entry to which substances, mixtures, solutions or articles may be assigned if a) they are not mentioned by name in 3.2 Dangerous Goods List AND b) they exhibit chemical, physical and/or dangerous properties corresponding to the Class, classification code, packing group and the name and description of the n.o.s. entry

== See also ==
- Lists of UN numbers
