= Butyne =

Butyne is an alkyne that contains 4 carbon and 6 hydrogen. It contains one triple bond and has two isomeric organic chemical compounds:

- 1-Butyne (ethylacetylene)
- 2-Butyne (dimethylacetylene)

== See also ==
- C_{4}H_{6}
- Butane (C_{4}H_{10})
- Butene (C_{4}H_{8})
