= Polyisobutene =

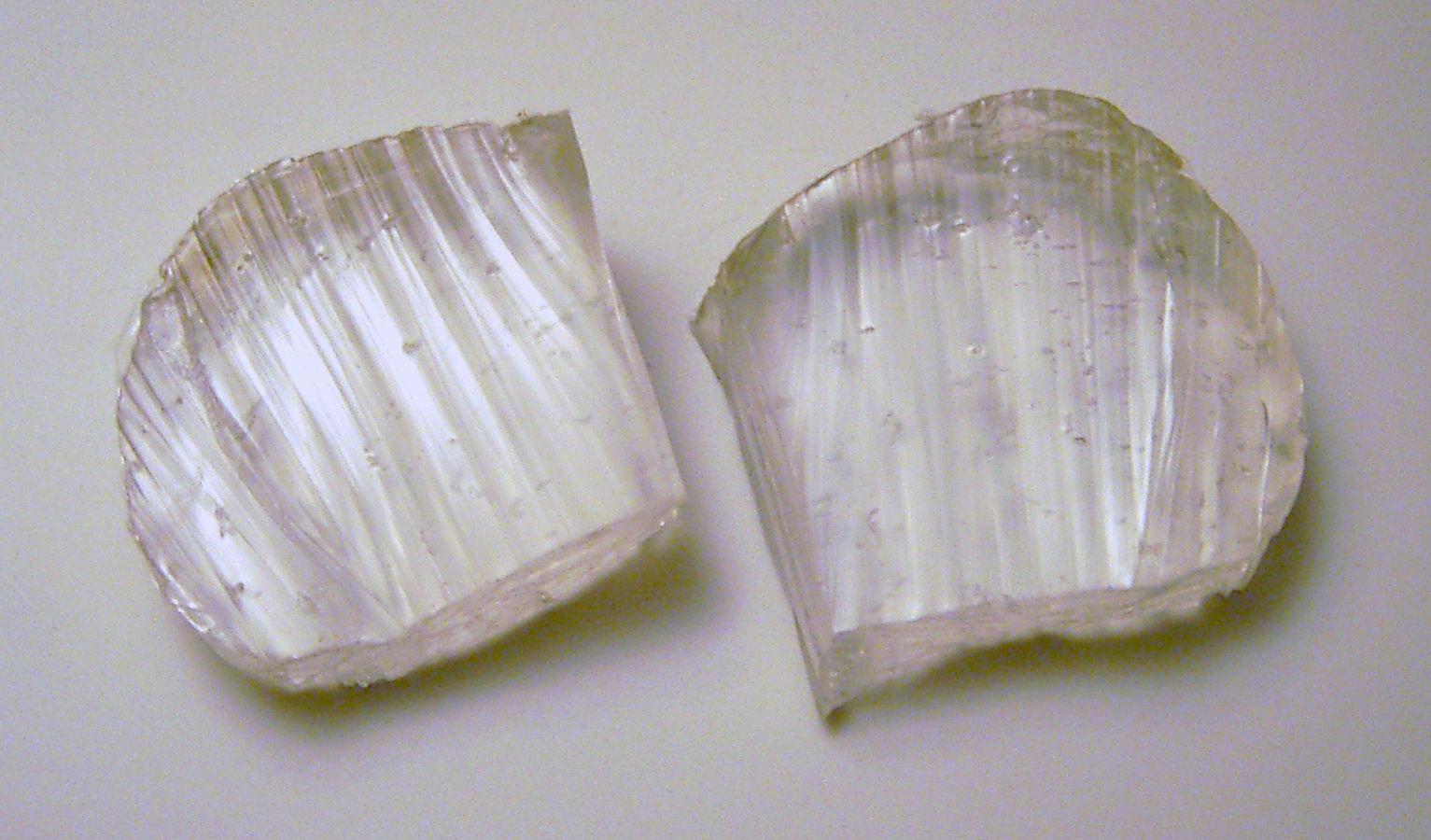
- Sample of polyisobutene with a molecular weight of ~1,000,000

Names
- Other names Polyisobutylene; Poly(isobutene); Poly(isobutylene); PIB

Identifiers
CAS Number	9003-27-4
ChEBI	CHEBI:53725
ECHA InfoCard	100.108.750
UNII	241BN7J12Y
CompTox Dashboard (EPA)	DTXSID2036451

Properties
Chemical formula	(C_{4}H_{8})_{n}
Molar mass	Variable
- Except where otherwise noted, data are given for materials in their standard state (at 25 °C [77 °F], 100 kPa). Infobox references

Polyisobutene (polyisobutylene) is a class of organic polymers prepared by polymerization of isobutene. The polymers often have the formula Me_{3}C[CH_{2}CMe_{2}]_{n}H (Me = CH_{3}). They are typically colorless gummy solids.

Cationic polymerization, initiated with a strong Brønsted or Lewis acid, is the typical method for its production. The molecular weight (MW) of the resulting polymer determines the applications. Low MW polyisobutene, a mixture of oligomers with M_{n}s of about 500, is used as plasticizers. Medium and high MW polyisobutenes, with M_{n} ≥ 20,000, are components of commercial adhesives.

== See also ==
- Butyl rubber
- Polybutene
