= Metathesis =

Metathesis may refer to:

== Changes of vocal properties ==
- Metathesis (linguistics), alteration of the order of phonemes within a word
- Quantitative metathesis, exchange of long and short roles, without changing order of vowel sounds

== Chemical change in which a pair of molecules exchange electronic patterns of bonding ==
- Salt metathesis reaction, exchange of bonds between two reacting chemical species
- Olefin metathesis, redistribution of olefinic (alkene) chemical bonds
- Alkane metathesis, redistribution of alkane chemical bonds
- Alkyne metathesis, redistribution of alkyne chemical bonds
