= C4H6 =

The molecular formula C_{4}H_{6} (molar mass: 54.09 g/mol) may refer to:

- Bicyclobutane
- 1,3-Butadiene
- 1,2-Butadiene
- 1-Butyne
- Cyclobutene
- Dimethylacetylene (2-butyne)
- 1-Methylcyclopropene
- 3-Methylcyclopropene
- Methylenecyclopropane
- Trimethylenemethane
