= 1-Butyne =

- Simplified skeletal formula

- Full displayed formula

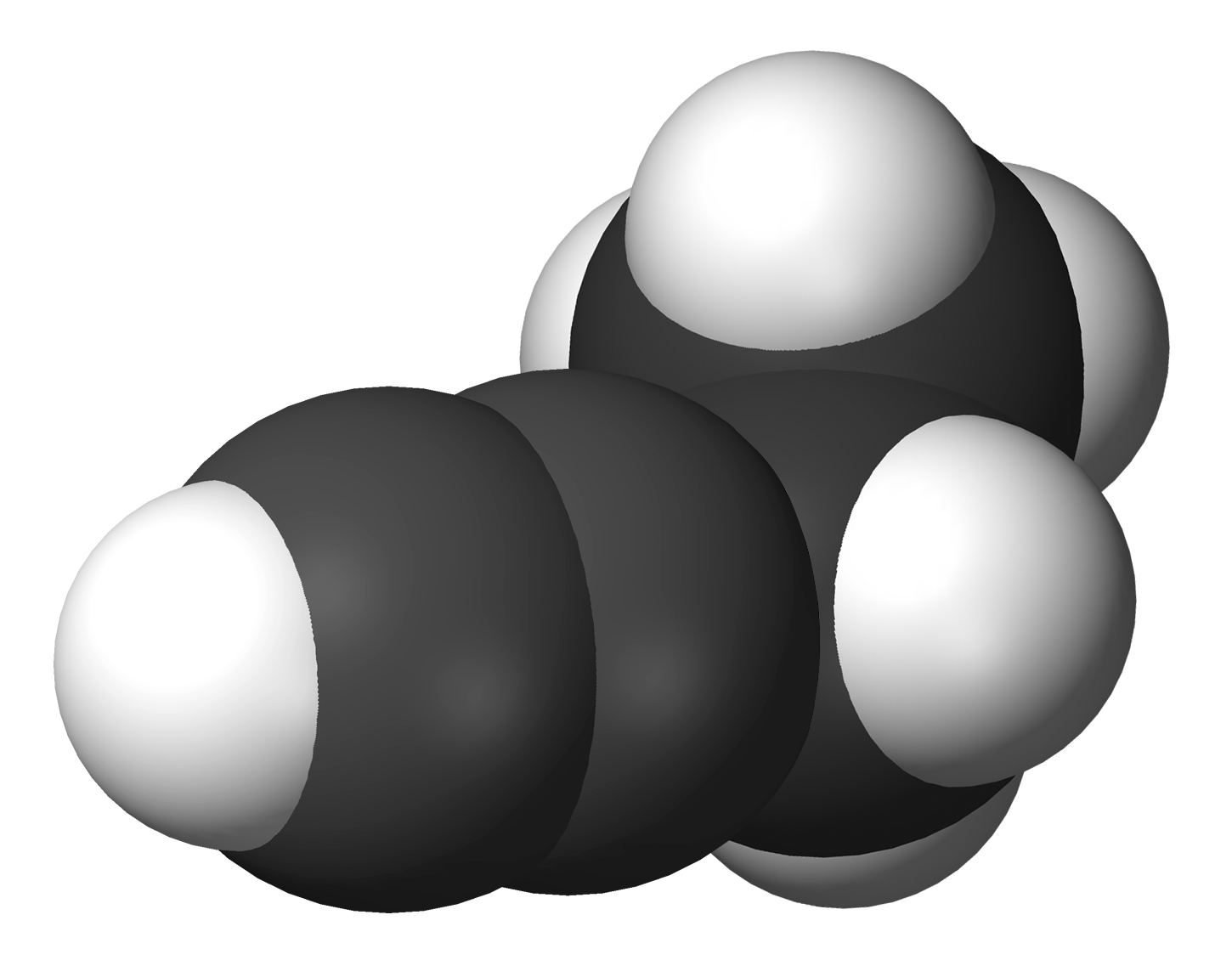
- Space-filling model

Names
- Preferred IUPAC name But-1-yne
- Other names Ethylacetylene; Ethylethyne, UN 2452

Identifiers
CAS Number	107-00-6
3D model (JSmol)	Interactive image
ChEBI	CHEBI:48087
ChemSpider	7558
ECHA InfoCard	100.003.139
EC Number	203-451-3
PubChem CID	7846
UNII	A6B47CPN6W
UN number	2452
CompTox Dashboard (EPA)	DTXSID4029141
- InChI: InChI=1S/C4H6/c1-3-4-2/h1H,4H2,2H3 Key: KDKYADYSIPSCCQ-UHFFFAOYSA-N; InChI=1/C4H6/c1-3-4-2/h1H,4H2,2H3 Key: KDKYADYSIPSCCQ-UHFFFAOYAI
- SMILES: C#CCC

Properties
Chemical formula	C_{4}H_{6}
Molar mass	54.091 g/mol
Odor	Acetylenic
Density	0.6783 g cm^{−3}
Melting point	−125.7 °C (−194.3 °F; 147.5 K)
Boiling point	8.08 °C (46.54 °F; 281.23 K)

Hazards
- GHS labelling
Pictograms	(GHS02: Flammable)
Signal word	Danger
Hazard statements	H220
Precautionary statements	P210, P377, P381, P403
Flash point	7°C (45°F)
- Except where otherwise noted, data are given for materials in their standard state (at 25 °C [77 °F], 100 kPa). verify (what is ?) Infobox references

1-Butyne is an organic compound with the formula CH_{3}CH_{2}C≡CH. It is a terminal alkyne. The compound is a common terminal alkyne substrate in diverse studies of catalysis. It is a colorless combustible gas. In 2017, 3.9 million pounds (1,700 long tons) was produced in the USA.

1-Butyne participates in reactions typical for terminal alkynes, such as alkyne metathesis, hydrogenation, condensation with formaldehyde. Based on its heat of combustion, it is slightly more stable than its isomer 2-butyne.

The combustion of 1-Butyne produces propargyl radicals, a precursor to soot and polycyclic aromatic hydrocarbons, as the propargyl radicals can form basic aromatic rings, making butyne's fuel usage a concern for emissions.

1-Butyne is in unsaturated C_{4} petroleum cuts, and has to be separated out in industrial hydrorefining to make 1-butene, which is used to make low density polyethylene and polybutene. Distillation is impractical due to similar boiling points, so 1-butyne is removed by catalytic hydrogenation. Usually the catalyst is palladium, operated with liquid hydrocarbon and hydrogen gas at 20-60°C and pressures up to 10 bar.

== See also ==
- 2-Butyne
- Butadiene
- Cyclobutene
