= Alkyne metathesis =

Redistribution of alkyne chemical bonds

Reaction scheme of the alkyne metathesis - substituents are colored

Alkyne metathesis is an organic reaction that entails the redistribution of alkyne chemical bonds. The reaction requires metal catalysts. Mechanistic studies show that the conversion proceeds via the intermediacy of metal alkylidyne complexes. The reaction is related to olefin metathesis.

== History ==
The Mortreux system consists of molybdenum hexacarbonyl resorcinol catalyst system. The phenyl and p-methylphenyl substituents on the alkyne group are scrambled

Metal-catalyzed alkyne metathesis was first described in 1968 by Bailey, et al. The Bailey system utilized a mixture of tungsten and silicon oxides at temperatures as high as 450 °C. In 1974 Mortreux reported the use of a homogeneous catalyst—molybdenum hexacarbonyl at 160 °C—to observe an alkyne scrambling phenomenon, in which an unsymmetrical alkyne equilibrates with its two symmetrical derivatives. The Mortreux system consists of the molybdenum precatalyst molybdenum hexacarbonyl Mo(CO)_{6} and resorcinol cocatalyst. In 1975, T. J. Katz proposed a metal carbyne (i.e. alkylidyne) and a metallacyclobutadiene as intermediates. In 1981, R. R. Schrock characterized several metallacyclobutadiene complexes that were catalytically active.

Molybdenum catalyst with aniline-derived ligands are highly effective catalysts.

Catalysts for alkyne metathesis

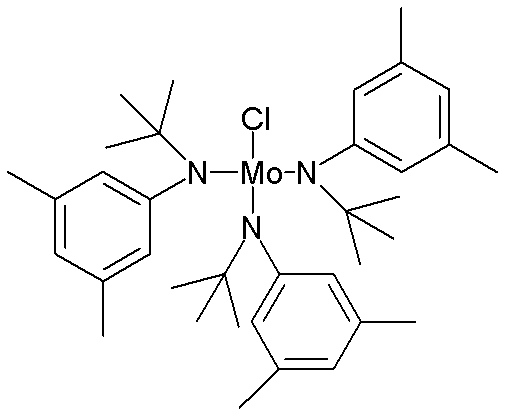

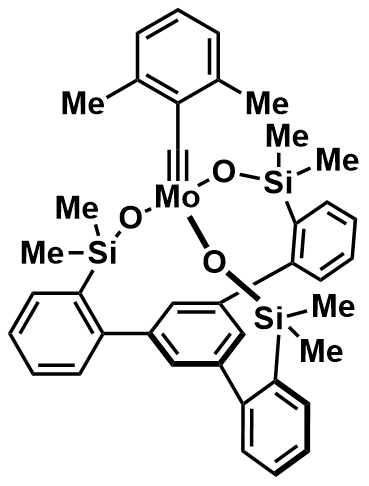
"canopy catalysts"

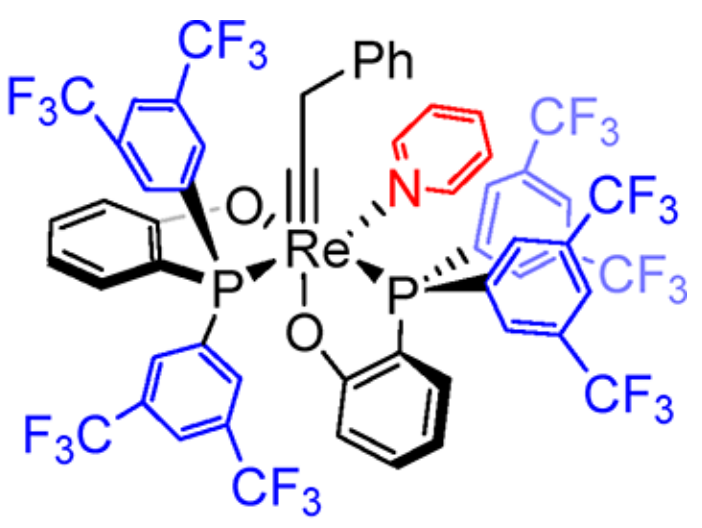
Air stable low-valent d2 rhenium alkylidyne

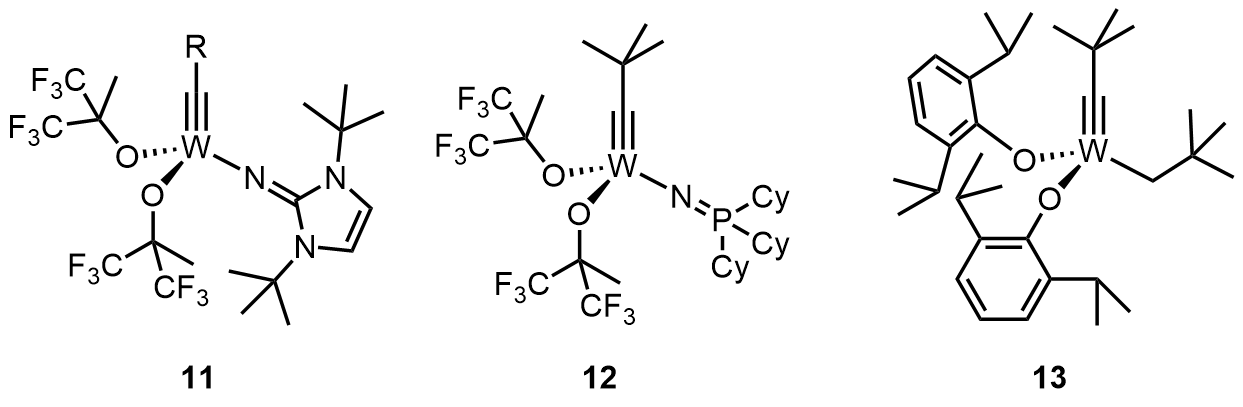
various Schrock-based alkyne metathesis catalysts

The so-called "canopy catalysts" containing tripodal ligands are particularly active and easy to prepare. Thorough experimental and computational studies showed that metallatetrahedranes were isolable but dynamic species within the catalytic cycle. Alkyne metathesis catalyst have also been developed using rhenium(V) complexes. Such catalysts are air stable and tolerant of diverse functional groups, including carboxylic acids.

== Catalyst degradation ==
Typical degradation pathways for these catalysts include hydrolysis and oxidation.

Dimerization of the alkylidyne units remains possible, as can be seen from complex 28, which was isolated in small amounts. In addition to the decomposition pathways by bimolecular collision or hydrolysis, Schrock alkylidyne complexes degrade upon attempted metathesis of terminal alkynes. The critical step occurs after formation of the metallacycle and consists of a transannular C-H activation with formation of a deprotio-metallacyclobutadiene and concomitant loss of one alkoxide ligand. This reaction course remains viable for the new alkylidynes with silanolate ligands. Specifically, compound 29 could be isolated upon addition of 1,10-phenanthroline. As a result, terminal alkynes can not be metathesized under existing catalysis system with similar efficiency.

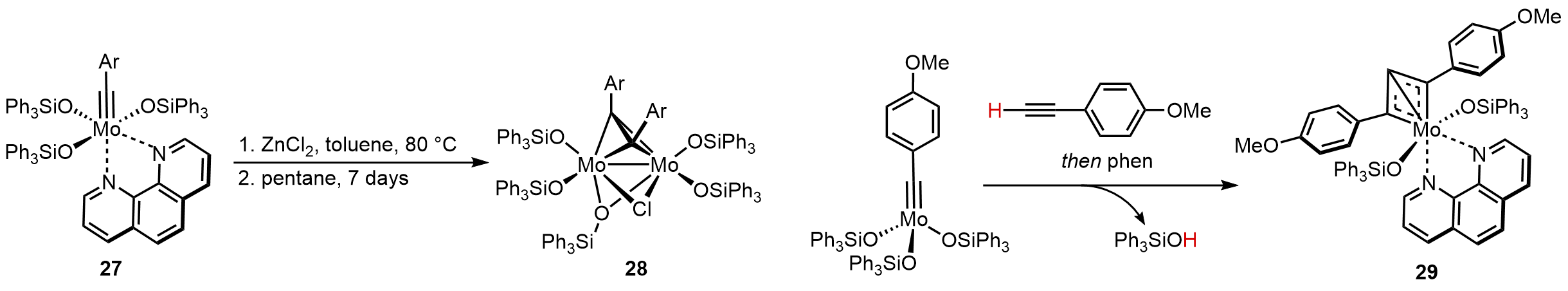

In practice, 5 Å MS is used as butyne scavenger to shift the equilibrium to products.

== Ring closing alkyne metathesis ==
=== General ===
Alkyne metathesis can be used in ring-closing operations and RCAM stands for ring closing alkyne metathesis. The olfactory molecule civetone can be synthesised from a di-alkyne. After ring closure the new triple bond is stereoselectively reduced with hydrogen and the Lindlar catalyst in order to obtain the Z-alkene (cyclic E-alkenes are available through the Birch reduction). An important driving force for this type of reaction is the expulsion of small gaseous molecules such as acetylene or but-2-yne.

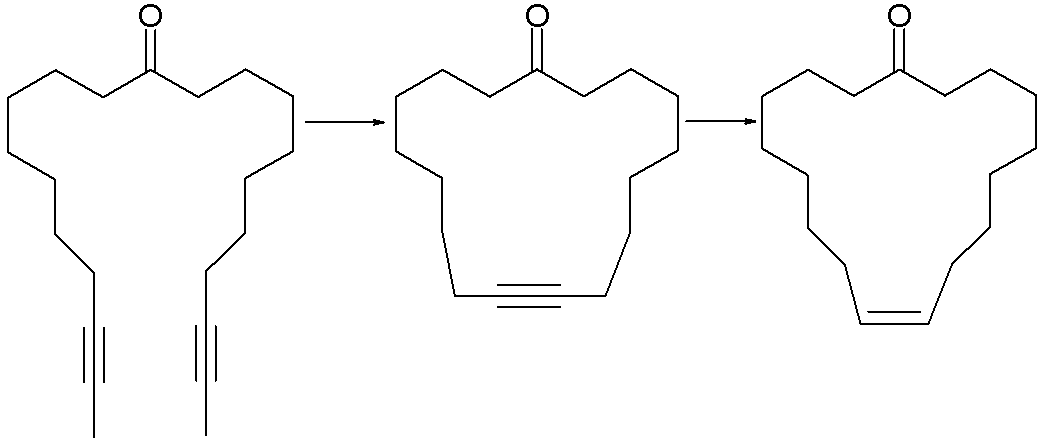

The same two-step procedure was used in the synthesis of the naturally occurring cyclophane turriane.

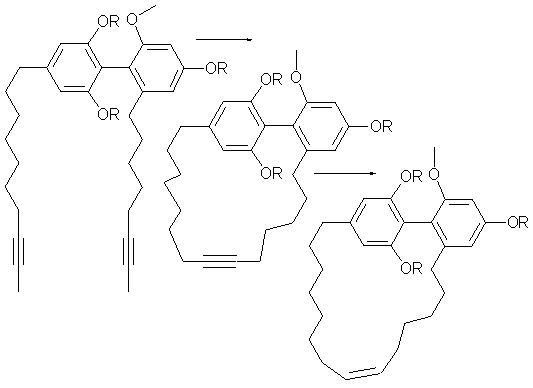

Trisamidomolybdenum(VI) alkylidyne complexes catalyze alkyne metathesis.

=== Natural product synthesis ===
RCAM can also be used as strategic step in natural product total synthesis. Some examples show the power of these catalysts. For example, RCAM can serve as key step in total synthesis of marine prostanoid hybridalactone, where epoxide, internal olefin and ester are tolerated.

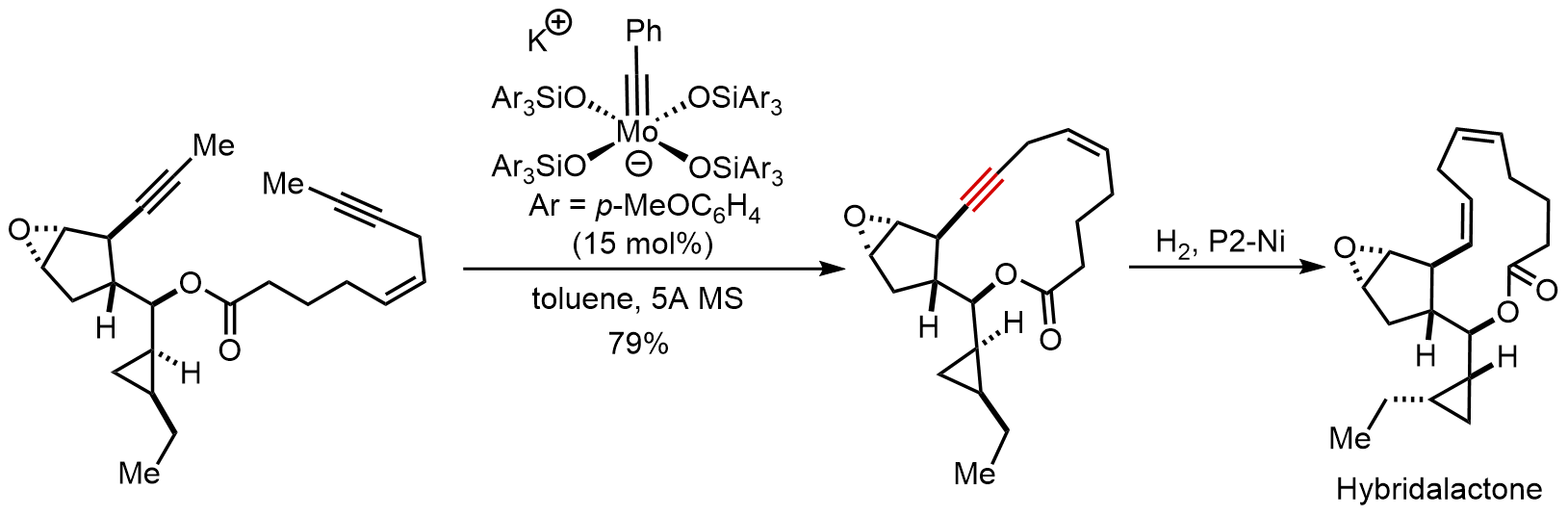

Another example shows a highly functionalized enyne, which displays a rare thiazolidinone unit, can be metathesized under Mo(III) catalyst, neither this unusual sulfur-containing heterocycle nor the elimination-prone tertiary glycoside posed any problem in the ring-closing step.

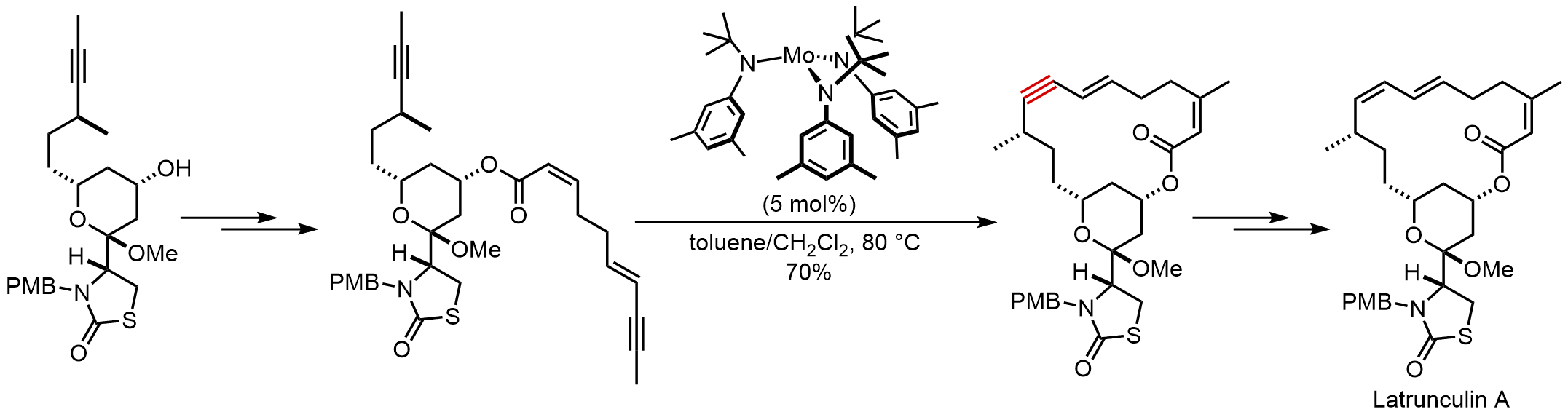

The total synthesis of spirastrellolide F employs alkyne metathesis in one step. The molecular frame of this potent phosphatase inhibitor is decorated with no less than 21 stereogenic centers and features a labile skipped diene in the side chain. Its macrocyclic core incorporates a tetrahydropyran ring, a spiroketal unit, as well as a highly unusual chlorinated bis-spiroketal motif. Specifically, a sequence of RCAM coupled with a gold-catalyzed acetalization successfully build the polycyclic system at the late stage of the synthesis.

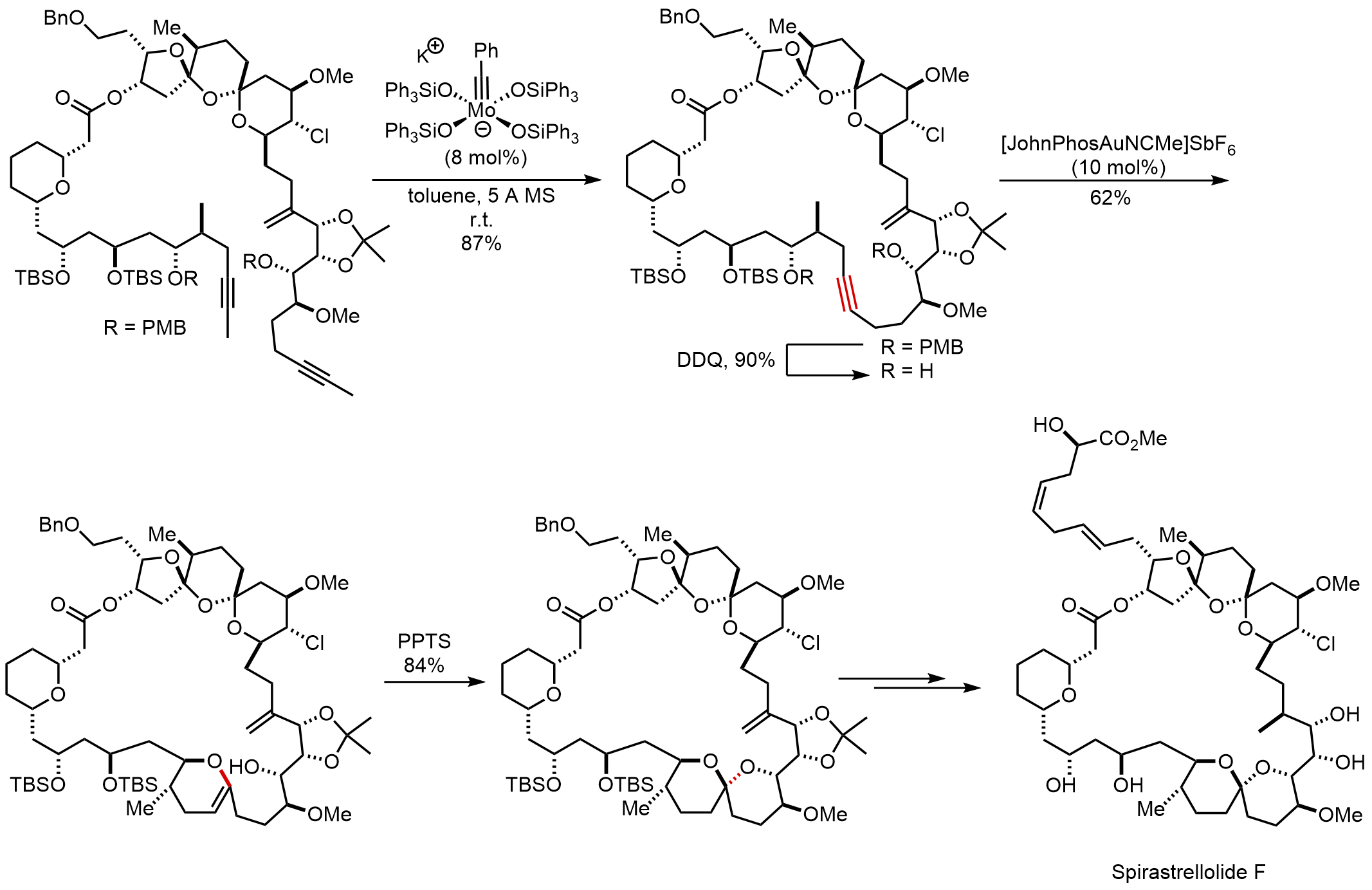

== Nitrile-alkyne cross-metathesis ==
By replacing a tungsten alkylidyne by a tungsten nitride and introducing a nitrile Nitrile-Alkyne Cross-Metathesis or NACM couples two nitrile groups together to a new alkyne. Nitrogen is collected by use of a sacrificial alkyne (elemental N_{2} is not formed):

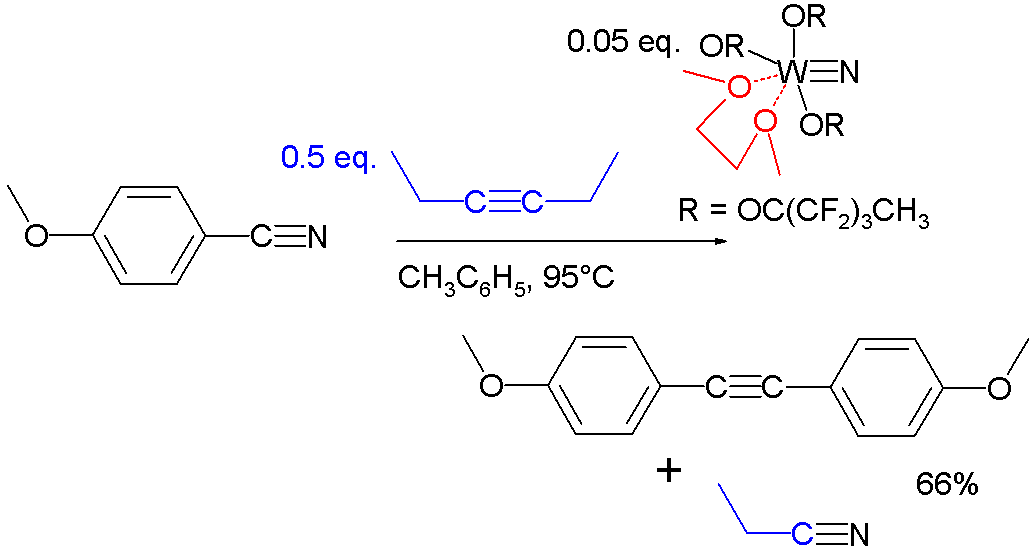

== See also ==
- Olefin metathesis, redistribution of alkene bonds
- Alkane metathesis, redistribution of alkane bonds
