= 1,2-Epoxybutane =

Names
- Preferred IUPAC name Ethyloxirane
- Other names 1,2-Butyleneoxide; 1,2-Buteneoxide; Ethyloxyrane

Identifiers
CAS Number	106-88-7; (R): 3760-95-0; (S): 30608-62-9
3D model (JSmol)	(R): Interactive image; (S): Interactive image
ChemSpider	7546; (R): 9322778; (S): 9073889
ECHA InfoCard	100.003.127
EC Number	203-438-2
PubChem CID	7834; (R): 11147670; (S): 10898629
RTECS number	EK3675000
UNII	FR67H5388O
UN number	3022
CompTox Dashboard (EPA)	DTXSID501096378, DTXSID001022374 DTXSID6020569, DTXSID501096378, DTXSID001022374
- InChI: InChI=1S/C4H8O/c1-2-4-3-5-4/h4H,2-3H2,1H3 Key: RBACIKXCRWGCBB-UHFFFAOYSA-N; (R): InChI=1S/C4H8O/c1-2-4-3-5-4/h4H,2-3H2,1H3/t4-/m1/s1 Key: RBACIKXCRWGCBB-SCSAIBSYSA-N; (S): InChI=1S/C4H8O/c1-2-4-3-5-4/h4H,2-3H2,1H3/t4-/m0/s1 Key: RBACIKXCRWGCBB-BYPYZUCNSA-N
- SMILES: CCC1CO1; (R): CC[C@@H]1CO1; (S): CC[C@H]1CO1

Properties
Chemical formula	C_{4}H_{8}O
Molar mass	72.107 g·mol^{−1}
Appearance	colorless liquid
Density	0.83 g·cm^{−3}
Melting point	−150 °C (−238 °F; 123 K)
Boiling point	65 °C (149 °F; 338 K)
Viscosity	0.40 mPa.s

Hazards
- GHS labelling
Pictograms	(GHS02: Flammable) (GHS07: Exclamation mark) (GHS08: Health hazard)
Signal word	Danger
Hazard statements	H225, H302, H312, H315, H319, H332, H335, H351, H412
Precautionary statements	P201, P202, P210, P233, P240, P241, P242, P243, P261, P264, P270, P271, P273, P280, P281, P301+P312, P302+P352, P303+P361+P353, P304+P312, P304+P340, P305+P351+P338, P308+P313, P312, P321, P322, P330, P332+P313, P337+P313, P362, P363, P370+P378, P403+P233, P403+P235, P405, P501
Flash point	−22 °C (−8 °F; 251 K)
- Except where otherwise noted, data are given for materials in their standard state (at 25 °C [77 °F], 100 kPa). Infobox references

1,2-Epoxybutane is an organic compound with the formula CH_{2}(O)CHCH_{2}CH_{3}. It is a chiral epoxide prepared by oxidation of 1-butene.

== Synthesis and reactions ==
1,2-Epoxybutane undergoes ring-opening reactions, e.g. to give the chlorohydrin.
