= ISO 15971 =

Standard energy measurement of natural gas

ISO 15971 is an ISO standard for calorific value measurement of natural gas and its substitutes. The methods it covered does not involve gas composition determination and the related calculations.

The standard includes the operation of instruments that are used in the measurements and the guidelines in selecting and assessing, as well as the installation and the operation of such instruments.

== See also ==
- Wobbe index
