= Alkane metathesis =

Type of chemical reaction

Alkane metathesis is a class of chemical reaction in which an alkane is rearranged to give a longer or shorter alkane product. It is similar to olefin metathesis, except that olefin metathesis cleaves and recreates a carbon-carbon double bond, but alkane metathesis operates on a carbon-carbon single bond.

== Examples and catalysts ==
Alkane metathesis is catalyzed by metal-containing compounds or complexes. One such class of catalyst systems, discovered and developed by the group of Jean-Marie Basset, comprises tantalum hydride supported on silica (SiO_{2})TaH at temperatures of 25°C to 200°C. These systems catalyze the conversion of ethane to give methane, propane and traces of butane. Cross metathesis can also take place, for example methane and propane can react to give two molecules of ethane. Ethane reacts with toluene to give ethylbenzene and xylene. The reaction involves metallocyclobutane intermediates just as in olefin metathesis.

Dual-catalyst systems have also been developed which are effective for the metathesis of higher alkanes. These systems are based on the tandem operation of two catalysts, one for transfer-dehydrogenation and one for olefin metathesis.

A heterogeneous system consisting of Pt on alumina mixed with W oxide on silica was reported by Burnett and Hughes. Systems based on pincer-iridium dehydrogenation catalysts and either "Schrock-type" Mo-based olefin metathesis catalysts have been reported by Brookhart and Goldman. Because the iridium-based catalysts show selectivity for the termini of n-alkanes, these systems have the unique ability to effect alkane metathesis with some selectivity for product molecular weight. Thus for example n-hexane can be converted to ethane and n-decane as the major products.

Numerous applications for alkane metathesis involving petrochemicals and fuels can be envisaged. For example, the conversion of n-hexane to n-decane and ethane has been proposed for the purpose of improving the overall yield of diesel grade n-alkane (C_{9}H_{20} to C_{19}H_{40}) from Fischer–Tropsch reactors, which convert syngas to a broad range of n-alkanes.

Scott, Goldman and Brookhart have reported the metathesis of cycloalkanes with the pincer-Ir/Mo system. Cyclooctane (cyclo-C_{8}H_{16}), for example is converted to a mixture of cyclohexadecane (cyclo-C_{16}H_{32}) and higher rings as well as polymers.

== See also ==
- Alkene metathesis
- Alkyne metathesis
