= Vinyl bromide =

Names
- Preferred IUPAC name Bromoethene
- Other names Vinyl bromide 1-Bromoethene; Bromoethylene; 1-Bromoethylene; Monobromoethene; Monobromoethylene

Identifiers
CAS Number	593-60-2
3D model (JSmol)	Interactive image
ChEBI	CHEBI:51311
ChemSpider	11151
ECHA InfoCard	100.008.911
EC Number	209-800-6
KEGG	C19184
PubChem CID	11641
RTECS number	KU8400000
UNII	83NRW59KFY
UN number	1085
CompTox Dashboard (EPA)	DTXSID8021432
- InChI: InChI=1S/C2H3Br/c1-2-3/h2H,1H2 Key: INLLPKCGLOXCIV-UHFFFAOYSA-N; InChI=1/C2H3Br/c1-2-3/h2H,1H2 Key: INLLPKCGLOXCIV-UHFFFAOYAI
- SMILES: C=CBr

Properties
Chemical formula	C_{2}H_{3}Br
Molar mass	106.95 g/mol
Appearance	Colorless gas or liquid
Odor	pleasant
Density	1.525 g/cm^{3} at boiling point (liquid) 1.4933 g/cm^{3} at 20 °C
Melting point	−137.8 °C (−216.0 °F; 135.3 K)
Boiling point	15.8 °C (60.4 °F; 288.9 K)
Solubility in water	Insoluble
log P	1.57
Vapor pressure	206.8 kPa at 37.8 °C

Hazards
- GHS labelling
Pictograms	(GHS02: Flammable) (GHS08: Health hazard)
Signal word	Danger
Hazard statements	H220, H350
Precautionary statements	P201, P202, P210, P281, P308+P313, P377, P381, P403, P405, P501
NFPA 704 (fire diamond)	2 4 1
Flash point	5 °C (41 °F; 278 K)
Autoignition temperature	530 °C (986 °F; 803 K)
Explosive limits	9%-15%
- NIOSH (US health exposure limits)
PEL (Permissible)	none
REL (Recommended)	Ca
IDLH (Immediate danger)	N.D.

Supplementary data page
- Vinyl bromide (data page)
- Except where otherwise noted, data are given for materials in their standard state (at 25 °C [77 °F], 100 kPa). verify (what is ?) Infobox references

Vinyl bromide is the organobromine compound with the formula CH_{2}=CHBr. Classified as a vinyl halide, it is a colorless gas at room temperature. It is used as a reagent and a comonomer.

== Synthesis, reactions, and applications ==
It is produced from ethylene dibromide:

CH_{2}Br−CH_{2}Br → CH_{2}=CHBr + HBr

CH_{2}=CHBr is mainly consumted as a comonomer to confer fire retardant properties to acrylate polymers.

Vinyl bromide reacts with magnesium to give the corresponding Grignard reagent CH_{2}=CHMgBr.

== Safety precautions ==
Vinyl bromide is listed in List of IARC Group 2A carcinogens as a suspected human carcinogen.

== See also ==
- Vinyl chloride
- Allyl bromide
- Bromoethane
