= Polybutene =

Type of organic polymer

Polybutene is an organic polymer made from a mixture of 1-butene, 2-butene, and isobutylene. C_{4} hydrocarbons, produced during ethylene steam cracking in oil processing, are also used as supplemental feed for polybutene. It is similar to polyisobutylene (PIB), which is produced from essentially pure isobutylene made in a C_{4} complex of a major refinery. The presence of isomers other than isobutylene can have several effects including: lower reactivity due to steric hindrance at the terminal carbon in, for example in polyisobutenylsuccinic anhydride (PIBSA) dispersant manufacture; and in the molecular weight–viscosity relationships of the two materials may also be somewhat different.

== Applications ==
Industrial product applications include sealants, adhesives, extenders for putties used for sealing roofs and windows, coatings, polymer modification, tackified polyethylene films, personal care products, and polybutene emulsions. Hydrogenated polybutenes are used in a wide variety of cosmetic preparations, such as lipstick and lip gloss. It is used as an adhesive in bird and squirrel repellents and is ubiquitous as the active agent in mouse and insect sticky traps.

An important physical property is that higher-molecular weight grades thermally degrade to lower-molecular weight polybutenes; those evaporate as well as degrade to butene monomers, which can evaporate further. This depolymerization mechanism, which allows clean and complete volatization, is in contrast to mineral oils which leave gum and sludge or thermoplastics which melt and spread. The property is valuable for a variety of applications. For smoke inhibition in two stroke engine fuels, as the lubricant can degrade at temperatures below the combustion temperature. For electrical lubricants and carriers which might be subject to overheating or fires, polybutene does not result in increased insulation (accelerating the overheating) or conductive carbon deposits.

== See also ==
- Polybutene-1
- Oligomers

== Bibliography ==
- Decroocq, S and Casserino, M, Polybutenes, Chapter 17 in Rudnick (Ed), Synthetics, Mineral Oils, and Bio-Based Lubricants: Chemistry and Technology, CRC Press (2005), Print ISBN 978-1-57444-723-1, eBook ISBN 978-1-4200-2718-1.
