= Butyl rubber =

Synthetic rubber; a copolymer of isobutylene with isoprene

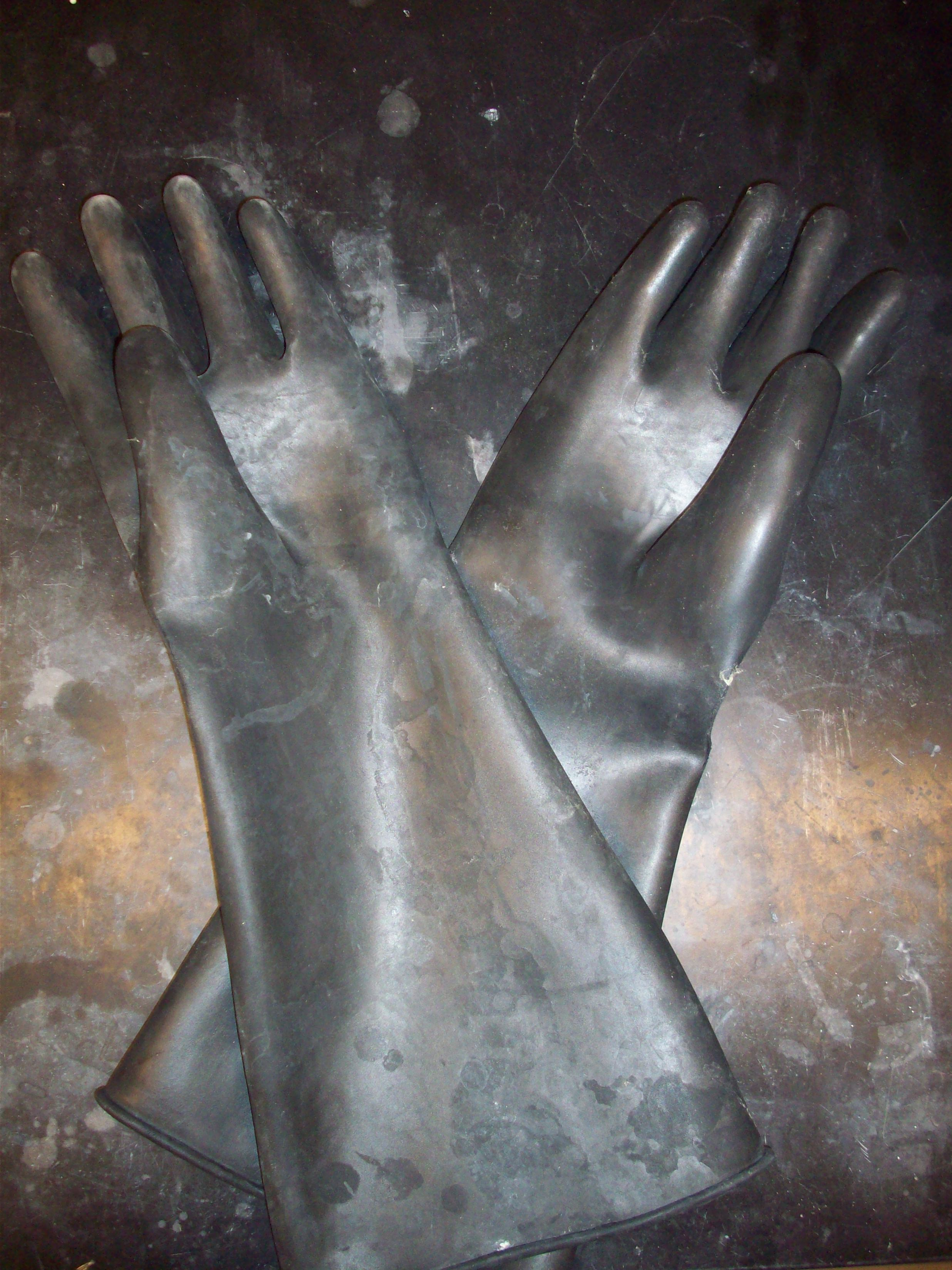
Butyl rubber gloves

Butyl rubber, sometimes just called butyl, is a synthetic rubber, a copolymer of isobutylene with isoprene. The abbreviation IIR stands for isobutylene isoprene rubber. Polyisobutylene, also known as "PIB" or polyisobutene, (C_{4}H_{8})_{n}, is the homopolymer of isobutylene, or 2-methyl-1-propene, on which butyl rubber is based. Butyl rubber is produced by polymerization of about 98% of isobutylene with about 2% of isoprene. Structurally, polyisobutylene resembles polypropylene, but has two methyl groups substituted on every other carbon atom, rather than one. Polyisobutylene is a colorless to light yellow viscoelastic material. It is generally odorless and tasteless, though it may exhibit a slight characteristic odor.

== Properties ==
Butyl rubber has excellent impermeability to gas diffusion, and the long polyisobutylene segments of its polymer chains give it good flex properties.

The formula for PIB is: –(–CH_{2}–C(CH_{3})_{2}–)_{n}–

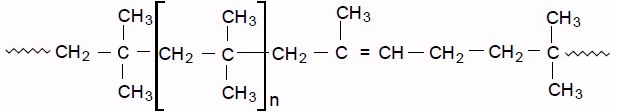
The formula for IIR is:

It can be made from the monomer isobutylene (CH_{2}=C(CH_{3})_{2}) only via cationic addition polymerization.

A synthetic rubber, or elastomer, butyl rubber is impermeable to air and used in many applications requiring an airtight rubber. Polyisobutylene and butyl rubber are used in the manufacture of adhesives, agricultural chemicals, fiber optic compounds, ball bladders, O-rings, caulks and sealants, cling film, electrical fluids, lubricants (2 stroke engine oil), paper and pulp, personal care products, pigment concentrates, for rubber and polymer modification, for protecting and sealing certain equipment for use in areas where chemical weapons are present, as a gasoline/diesel fuel additive, and chewing gum. The first major application of butyl rubber was tire inner tubes. This remains an important segment of its market even today.

== History ==
Isobutylene was discovered by Michael Faraday in 1825. Polyisobutylene (PIB) was first developed by the BASF unit of IG Farben in 1931 using a boron trifluoride catalyst at low temperatures and sold under the trade name Oppanol B. PIB remains a core business for BASF to this day.

It was later developed into butyl rubber in 1937, by researchers William J. Sparks and Robert M. Thomas, at Standard Oil of New Jersey's Linden, N.J., laboratory. Today, the majority of the global supply of butyl rubber is produced by two companies, ExxonMobil (one of the descendants of Standard Oil) and Polymer Corporation, a Canadian federal crown corporation established in 1942 to produce artificial rubber to substitute for overseas supply cut off by World War II. It was renamed Polysar in 1976 and the rubber component became a subsidiary, Polysar Rubber Corp. The company was privatized in 1988 with its sale to NOVA Corp which, in turn, sold Polysar Rubber in 1990 to Bayer AG of Germany. In 2005 Bayer AG spun off chemical divisions, including most of the Sarnia site, creating LANXESS AG, also of Germany.

PIB homopolymers of high molecular weight (100,000–400,000 or more) are polyolefin elastomers: tough extensible rubber-like materials over a wide temperature range; with low density (0.913–0.920), low permeability and excellent electrical properties.

In the 1950s and 1960s, halogenated butyl rubber (halobutyl) was developed, in its chlorinated (chlorobutyl) and brominated (bromobutyl) variants, providing significantly higher curing rates and allowing covulcanization with other rubbers such as natural rubber and styrene-butadiene rubber. Halobutyl is today the most important material for the inner linings of tubeless tires. Francis P. Baldwin received the 1979 Charles Goodyear Medal for the many patents he held for these developments.

In the spring of 2013 two incidents of PIB contamination in the English Channel, believed to be connected, were described as the worst UK marine pollution 'for decades'. The RSPB estimated over 2,600 seabirds were killed by the chemical and hundreds more were rescued and decontaminated.

== Uses ==
=== Fuel and lubricant additive ===
Polyisobutylene can be reacted with maleic anhydride to make polyisobutenylsuccinic anhydride (PIBSA), which can then be converted into polyisobutenylsuccinimides (PIBSI) by reacting it with various ethyleneamines. When used as an additive in lubricating oils and motor fuels, they can have a substantial effect on the properties of the oil or fuel. Polyisobutylene added in small amounts to the lubricating oils used in machining results in a significant reduction in the generation of oil mist and thus reduces the operator's inhalation of oil mist. It is also used to clean up waterborne oil spills as part of the commercial product Elastol. When added to crude oil it increases the oil's viscoelasticity when pulled, causing the oil to resist breakup when it is vacuumed from the surface of the water.

As a fuel additive, polyisobutylene has detergent properties. When added to diesel fuel, it resists fouling of fuel injectors, leading to reduced hydrocarbon and particulate emissions. It is blended with other detergents and additives to make a "detergent package" that is added to gasoline and diesel fuel to resist buildup of deposits and engine knock.

Polyisobutylene is used in some formulations as a thickening agent.

=== Explosives ===
Polyisobutylene is often used by the explosives industry as a binding agent in plastic explosives such as C-4. Polyisobutylene binder is used because it makes the explosive more insensitive to premature detonation as well as making it easier to handle and mold.

=== Speakers and audio equipment ===
Butyl rubber is generally used in speakers, specifically the surrounds. It was used as a replacement for foam surrounds because the foam would deteriorate. The majority of modern speakers use butyl rubber, while most vintage speakers use foam.

=== Sporting equipment ===
Butyl rubber is used for the bladders in sporting balls (e.g. Rugby balls, footballs, basketballs, netballs) and to make bicycle inner tubes to provide a tough, airtight inner compartment.

=== Damp proofing and roof repair ===
Butyl rubber sealant is used for damp proofing, rubber roof repair and for maintenance of roof membranes (especially around the edges). It is important to have the roof membrane fixed, as a lot of fixtures (e.g., air conditioner vents, plumbing, and other pipes) can considerably loosen it.

Rubber roofing typically refers to a specific type of roofing materials that are made of ethylene propylene diene monomers (EPDM rubber). It is crucial to the integrity of such roofs to avoid using harsh abrasive materials and petroleum-based solvents for their maintenance.

Polyester fabric laminated to butyl rubber binder provides a single-sided waterproof tape that can be used on metal, PVC, and cement joints. It is used for repairing and waterproofing metal roofs.

=== Gas masks and chemical agent protection ===
Butyl rubber is one of the most robust elastomers when subjected to chemical warfare agents and decontamination materials. It is a harder and less porous material than other elastomers, such as natural rubber or silicone, but still has enough elasticity to form an airtight seal. While butyl rubber will break down when exposed to agents such as NH_{3} (ammonia) or certain solvents, it breaks down more slowly than comparable elastomers. It is therefore used to create seals in gas masks and other protective clothing.

=== Pharmaceutical stoppers ===
Butyl and bromobutyl rubber are commonly used for manufacturing rubber stoppers used for sealing medicine vials and bottles.

=== Chewing gum ===
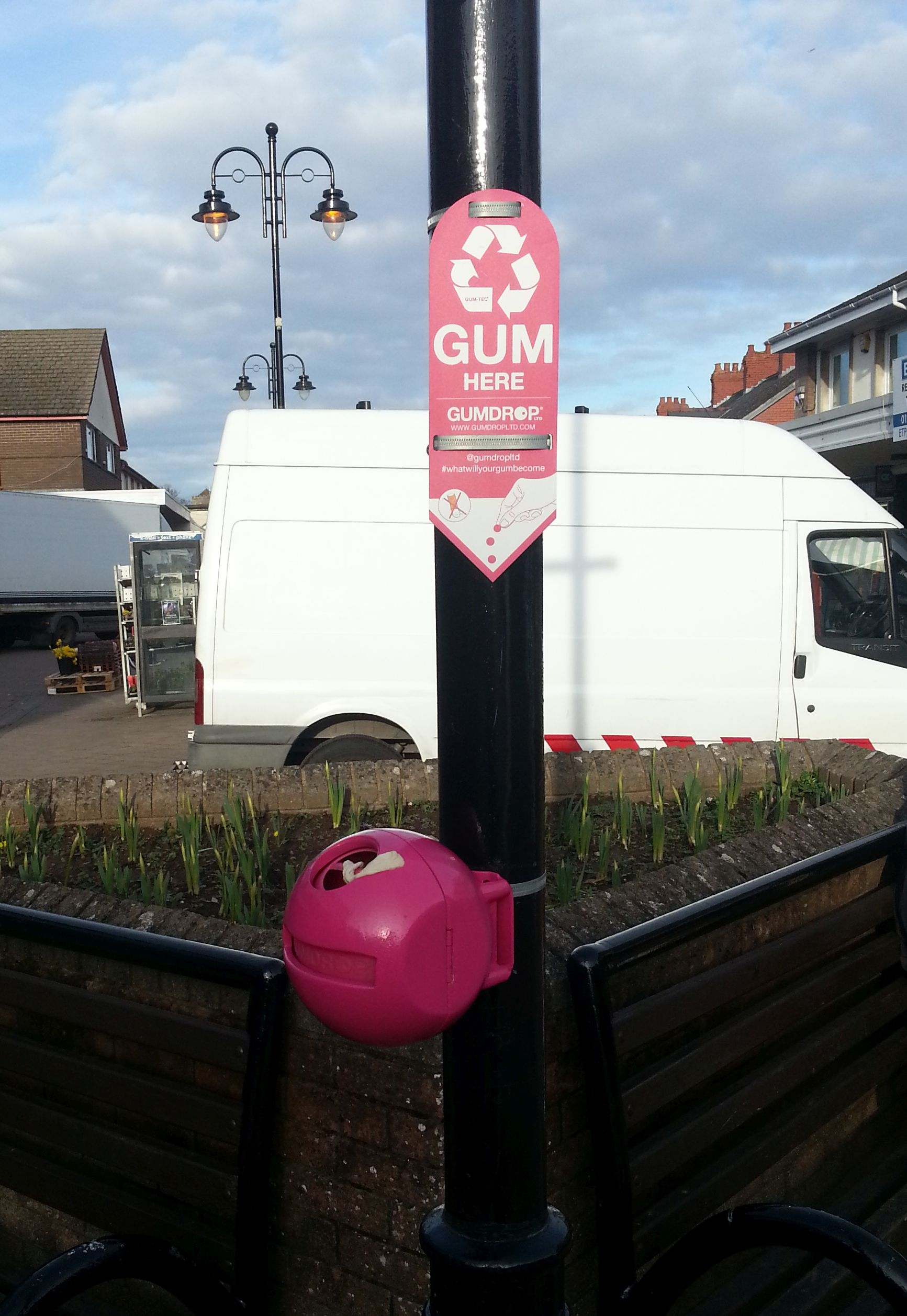
Gumdrop chewing gum collecting bin

Most modern chewing gum uses food-grade butyl rubber as the central gum base, which contributes not only the gum's elasticity but also gives it a stubborn, sticky quality which has led some municipalities to propose taxation to cover costs of its removal.

Recycled chewing gum has also been used as a source of recovered polyisobutylene. Amongst other products, this base rubber has been manufactured into coffee cups and 'Gumdrop' gum-collecting bins. When filled, the collecting bins and their contents are shredded together and recycled again.

=== Tires ===
Because of their superior resistance to gas diffusion, butyl rubber and halogenated rubber are used for the innerliner inside pneumatic tubeless tires, and for the inner tube in older tires.

=== Insulating windows ===
Polyisobutylene is used as the primary seal in an insulating glass unit for commercial and residential construction providing the air and moisture seal for the unit.

=== Sealant ===
In tape or caulk form, butyl can be used as a sealant. Butyl tape is a flexible material that under pressure, conforms to sealing surfaces and adheres to them.
