= 2-Butene =

cis
trans
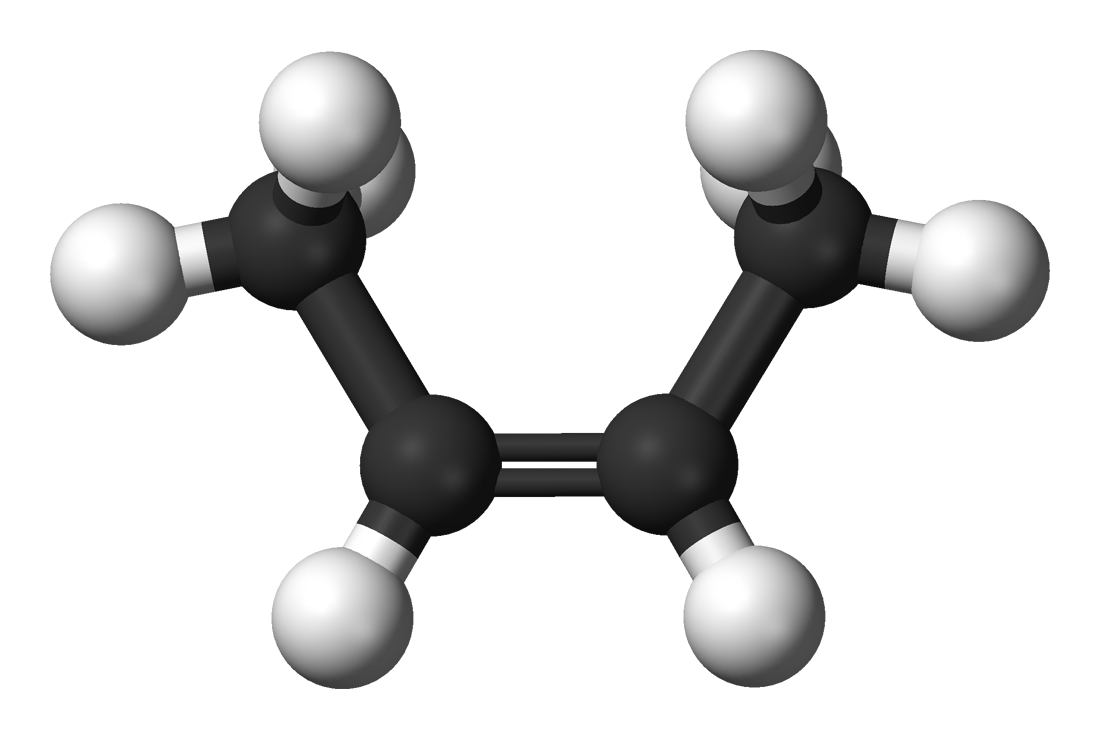
cis
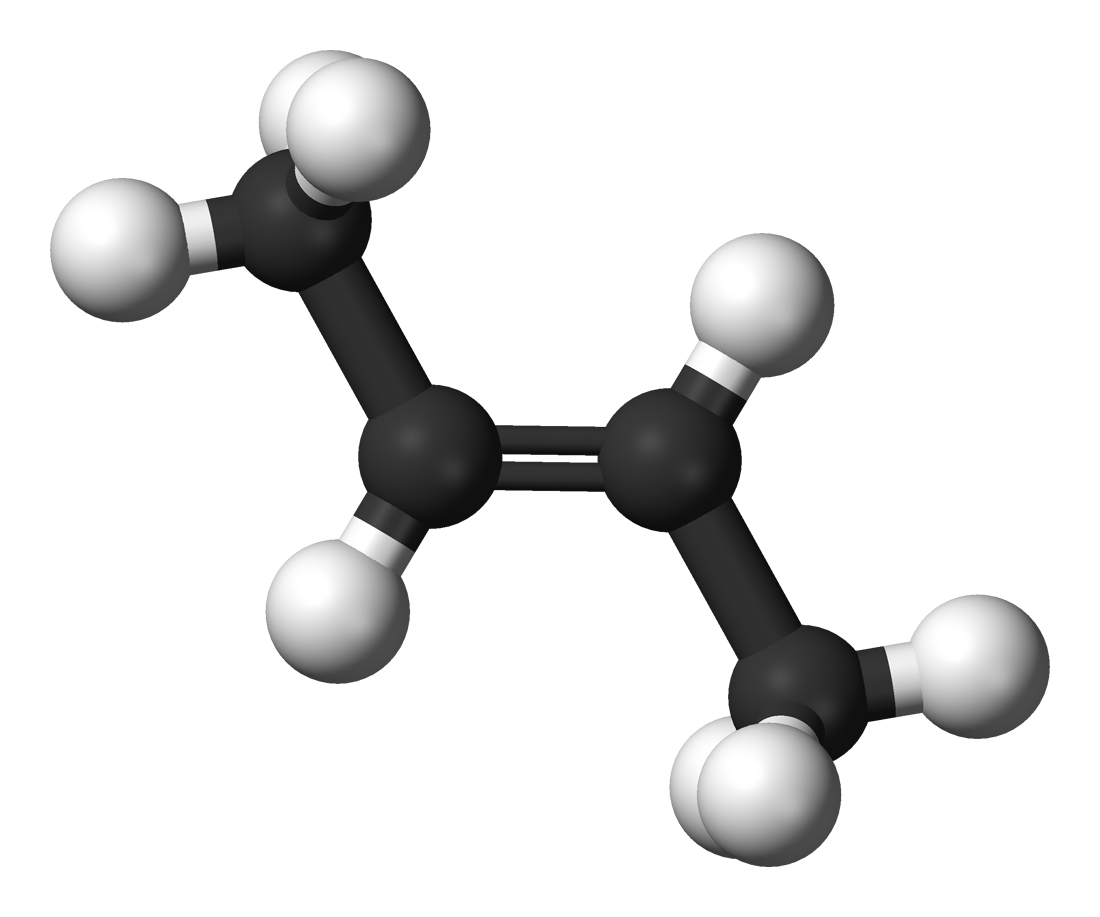
trans

Names
- Preferred IUPAC name But-2-ene
- Other names β-Butylene

Identifiers
| CAS Number | 107-01-7; (cis): 590-18-1; (trans): 624-64-6 |
| 3D model (JSmol) | Interactive image; (cis): Interactive image; (trans): Interactive image |
| Beilstein Reference | 1718755 1361341 |
| ChEBI | CHEBI:48363; (cis): CHEBI:48366; (trans): CHEBI:48365 |
| ChemSpider | 11719; (cis): 4449912; (trans): 56442 |
| ECHA InfoCard | 100.003.140 |
| EC Number | 203-452-9 |
| Gmelin Reference | 25196 1140 1141 |
| PubChem CID | (cis): 5287573; (trans): 62695 |
| RTECS number | EM2932000 1718756 |
| UNII | S1SK37516R; (cis): L35ORC9C05; (trans): 017NGL487F |
| CompTox Dashboard (EPA) | DTXSID1026748 |
- InChI: InChI=1S/C4H8/c1-3-4-2/h3-4H,1-2H3 Key: IAQRGUVFOMOMEM-UHFFFAOYSA-N; InChI=1/C4H8/c1-3-4-2/h3-4H,1-2H3 Key: IAQRGUVFOMOMEM-UHFFFAOYAW; (cis): InChI=1S/C4H8/c1-3-4-2/h3-4H,1-2H3/b4-3- Key: IAQRGUVFOMOMEM-ARJAWSKDSA-N; (trans): InChI=1S/C4H8/c1-3-4-2/h3-4H,1-2H3/b4-3+ Key: IAQRGUVFOMOMEM-ONEGZZNKSA-N
- SMILES: C(=CC)C; (cis): C/C=C\C; (trans): C/C=C/C

Properties
| Chemical formula | C_{4}H_{8} |
| Molar mass | 56.108 g·mol^{−1} |
| Density | 0.641 g/ml (cis, 3.7 °C); 0.626 g/ml (trans, 0.9 °C) |
| Melting point | −138.9 °C (−218.0 °F; 134.2 K) (cis) −105.5 °C (trans) |
| Boiling point | 0.8 to 3.7 °C (33.4 to 38.7 °F; 273.9 to 276.8 K) (Z = 3.7 °C) (E = 0.8 °C) |
| Magnetic susceptibility (χ) | −42.6·10^{−6} cm^{3}/mol (cis); −43.3·10^{−6} cm^{3}/mol (trans) |

Hazards
- GHS labelling
| Pictograms | |
| Signal word | Danger |
| Hazard statements | H220 |
| Precautionary statements | P210, P377, P381, P403 |
| NFPA 704 (fire diamond) | 1 4 0 |
| Flash point | −72 °C (−98 °F; 201 K) |
| Autoignition temperature | 325 °C (617 °F; 598 K) |

Related compounds
| Related butenes | 1-Butene cis-2-Butene trans-2-Butene; Isobutene |
| Related compounds | Butane; Butyne |
- Except where otherwise noted, data are given for materials in their standard state (at 25 °C [77 °F], 100 kPa). verify (what is ?) Infobox references

2-Butene is an acyclic alkene with four carbon atoms. It is the simplest alkene exhibiting cis/trans-isomerism (also known as (E/Z)-isomerism); that is, it exists as two geometric isomers cis-2-butene ((Z)-but-2-ene) and trans-2-butene ((E)-but-2-ene).

It is a petrochemical, produced by the catalytic cracking of crude oil or the dimerization of ethylene. Its main uses are in the production of high-octane gasoline (petrol) on alkylation units and butadiene, although some 2-butene is also used to produce the solvent butanone via hydration reaction to 2-butanol followed by oxidation.

The two isomers are extremely difficult to separate by distillation because of the proximity of their boiling points (~4 °C for cis and ~1 °C for trans). However, separation is unnecessary in most industrial settings, as both isomers behave similarly in most of the desired reactions. A typical industrial 2-butene mixture is 70% (Z)-but-2-ene (cis-isomer) and 30% (E)-but-2-ene (trans-isomer). Butane and 1-butene are common impurities, present at 1% or more in industrial mixtures, which also contain smaller amounts of isobutene, butadiene and butyne.
