= Isobutylene =

Unsaturated hydrocarbon compound (H2C=C(CH3)2)

- Skeletal formula of isobutylene

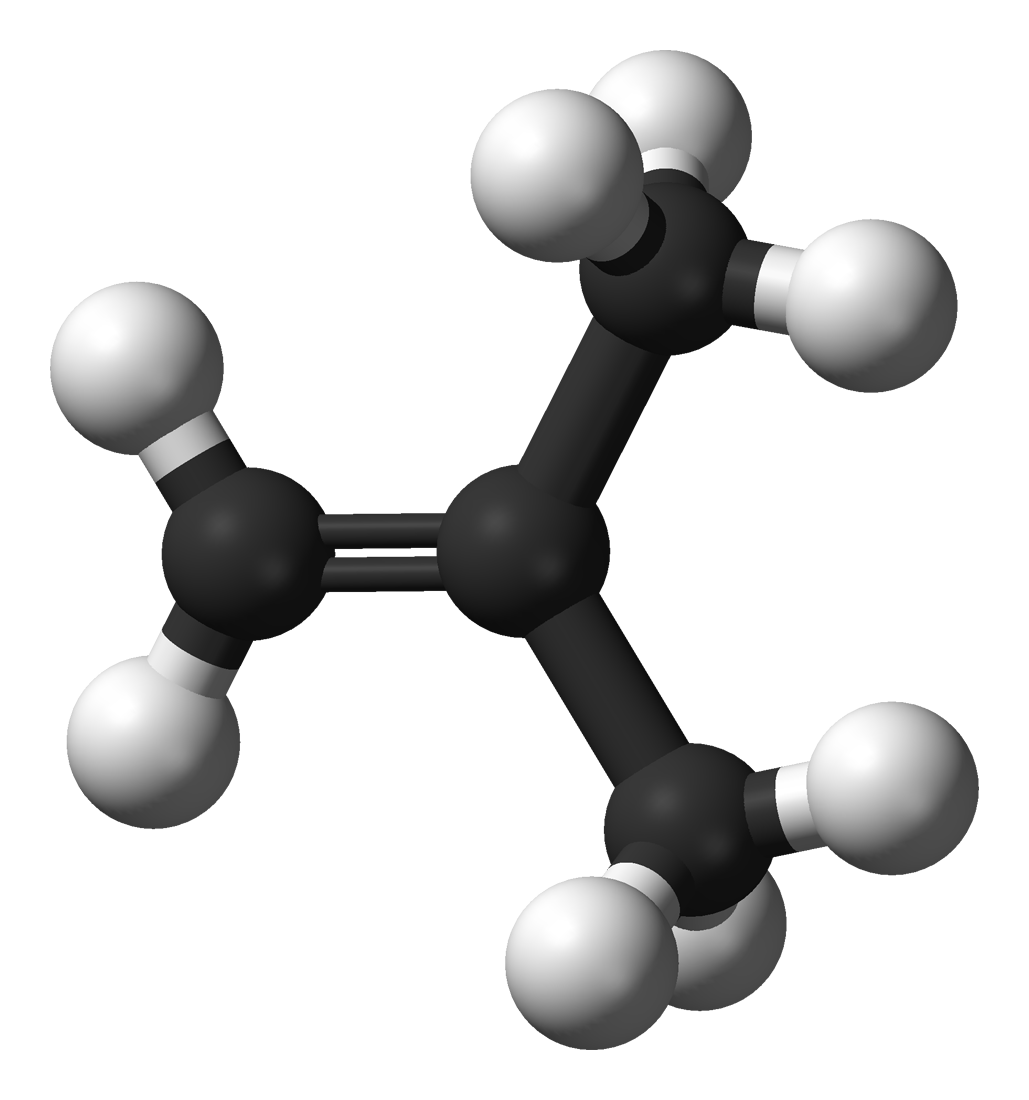
Ball-and-stick model of isobutylene
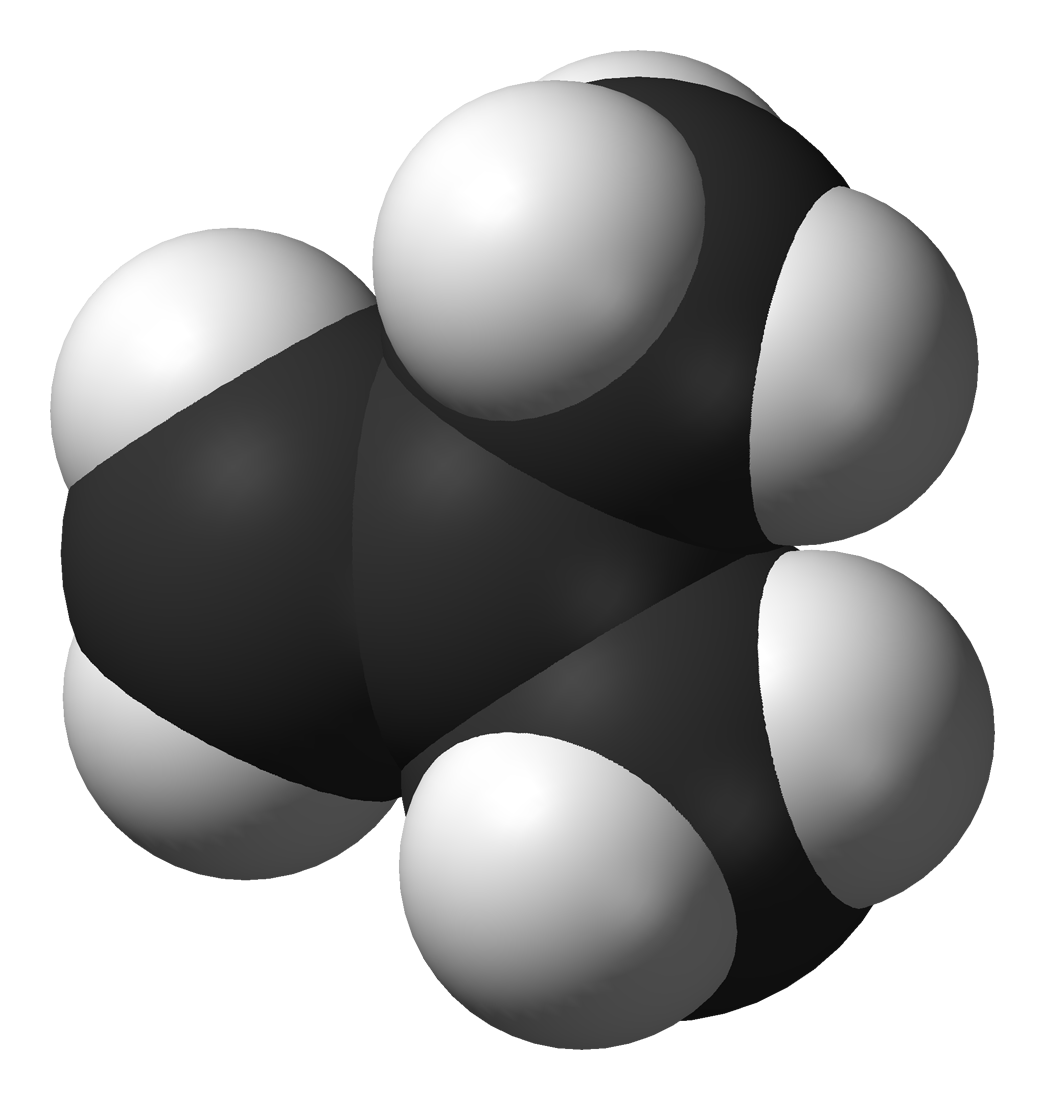
Space-filling model of isobutylene

Names
- Preferred IUPAC name 2-Methylprop-1-ene
- Other names 2-Methylpropene; Isobutene γ-Butylene; 2-Methylpropylene; Methylpropene

Identifiers
CAS Number	115-11-7
3D model (JSmol)	Interactive image
ChEBI	CHEBI:43907
ChemSpider	7957
ECHA InfoCard	100.003.697
EC Number	204-066-3
PubChem CID	8255
RTECS number	UD0890000
UNII	QA2LMR467H
UN number	1055; In Liquefied petroleum gas: 1075
CompTox Dashboard (EPA)	DTXSID9020748
- InChI: InChI=1S/C4H8/c1-4(2)3/h1H2,2-3H3 Key: VQTUBCCKSQIDNK-UHFFFAOYSA-N; InChI=1/C4H8/c1-4(2)3/h1H2,2-3H3
- SMILES: CC(=C)C

Properties
Chemical formula	C_{4}H_{8}
Molar mass	56.108 g·mol^{−1}
Appearance	Colorless gas
Density	0.5879 g/cm^{3}, liquid
Melting point	−140.3 °C (−220.5 °F; 132.8 K)
Boiling point	−6.9 °C (19.6 °F; 266.2 K)
Magnetic susceptibility (χ)	−44.4·10^{−6} cm^{3}/mol

Structure
Point group	C_{2v}

Hazards
- GHS labelling
Pictograms	
Signal word	Danger
Hazard statements	H220
Precautionary statements	P210, P377, P381, P403
NFPA 704 (fire diamond)	1 4 0
Flash point	flammable gas
Autoignition temperature	465 °C (869 °F; 738 K)
Explosive limits	1.8–9.6%

Related compounds
Related butenes	1-Butene cis-2-Butene trans-2-Butene
Related compounds	Isobutane
- Except where otherwise noted, data are given for materials in their standard state (at 25 °C [77 °F], 100 kPa). verify (what is ?) Infobox references

Isobutylene (or 2-methylpropene) is a hydrocarbon with the chemical formula (CH_{3})_{2}C=CH_{2}. It is a four-carbon branched alkene (olefin), one of the four isomers of butylene. It is a colorless flammable gas, and is of considerable industrial value.

== Production ==
Polymer and chemical grade isobutylene is typically obtained by dehydrating tertiary butyl alcohol (TBA) or catalytic dehydrogenation of isobutane. Gasoline additives methyl tert-butyl ether (MTBE) and ethyl tert-butyl ether (ETBE), respectively, are produced by reacting methanol or ethanol with isobutylene contained in butene streams from olefin steam crackers or refineries, or with isobutylene from dehydrated TBA. Isobutylene is not isolated from the olefin or refinery butene stream before the reaction, as separating the ethers from the remaining butenes is simpler. Isobutylene can also be produced in high purities by "back-cracking" MTBE or ETBE at high temperatures and then separating the isobutylene by distillation from methanol.

Isobutylene is a byproduct in the ethenolysis of diisobutene to prepare neohexene:

(CH_{3})_{3}C-CH=C(CH_{3})_{2} + CH_{2}=CH_{2} → (CH_{3})_{3}C-CH=CH_{2} + (CH_{3})_{2}C=CH_{2}

== Uses ==
Isobutylene is used in the production of a variety of products. It is alkylated with butane to produce isooctane or dimerized to diisobutylene (DIB) and then hydrogenated to make isooctane, a fuel additive. Isobutylene is also used in the production of methacrolein. Polymerization of isobutylene produces butyl rubber (polyisobutylene or PIB). Antioxidants such as butylated hydroxytoluene (BHT) and butylated hydroxyanisole (BHA) are produced by Friedel-Crafts alkylation of phenols with isobutylene.

tert-Butylamine is produced commercially by amination of isobutylene using zeolite catalysts:

NH_{3} + CH_{2}=C(CH_{3})_{2} → H_{2}NC(CH_{3})_{3}

Applications are found in the calibration of photoionization detectors.

== Safety ==
Isobutylene is a highly flammable gas.

== See also ==
- Butyl rubber
- Polythene
- Polybutene
- Perfluoroisobutene
