= 2-Butyne =

Alkyne with four carbon atoms

- $\ce{H3C-C#C-CH3}$
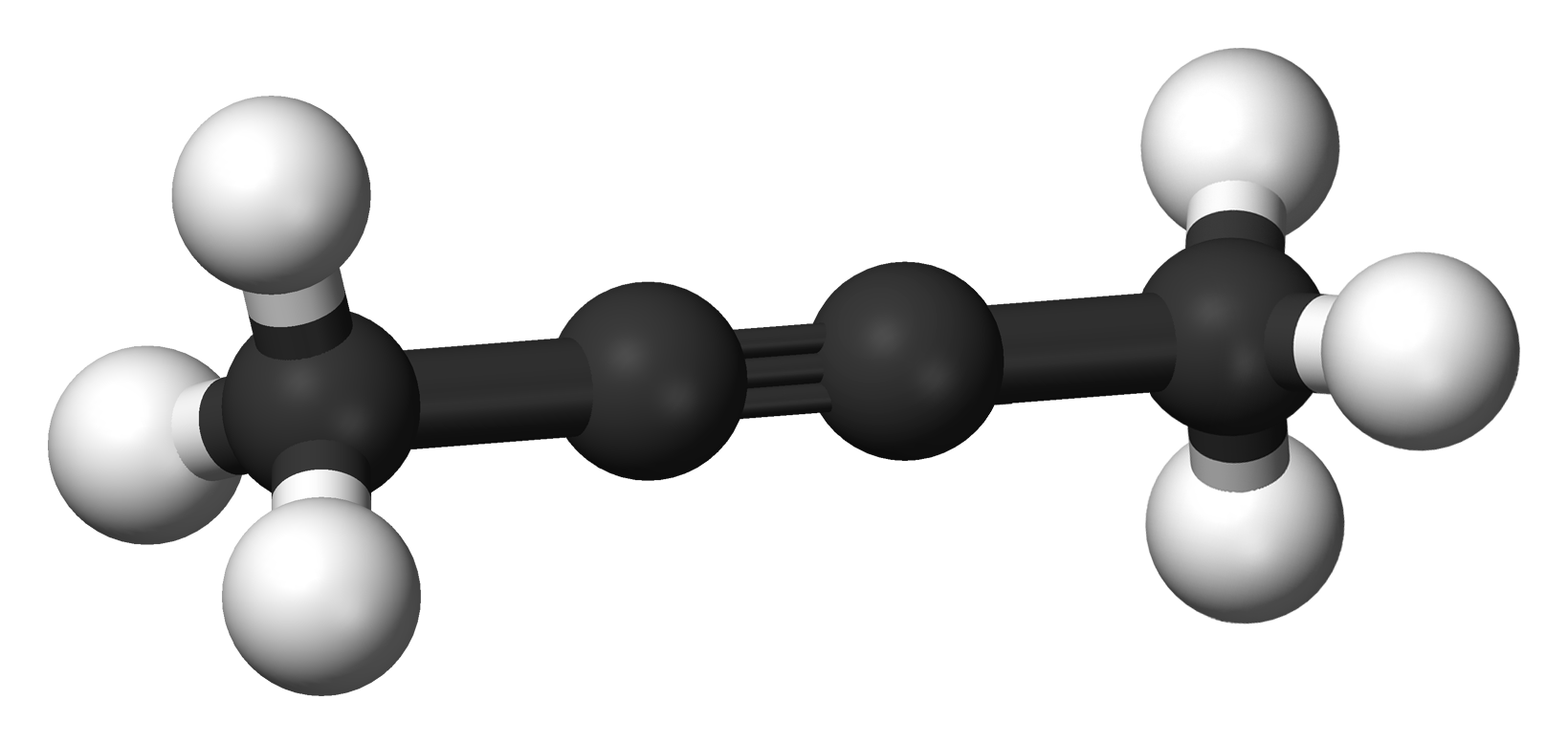
- Ball-and-stick model

Names
- Preferred IUPAC name But-2-yne
- Other names Dimethylacetylene; Crotonylene

Identifiers
CAS Number	503-17-3
3D model (JSmol)	Interactive image
ChEMBL	ChEMBL119108
ChemSpider	9990
ECHA InfoCard	100.007.239
PubChem CID	10419
UNII	LKE6D3018E
CompTox Dashboard (EPA)	DTXSID3060116
- InChI: InChI=1S/C4H6/c1-3-4-2/h1-2H3 Key: XNMQEEKYCVKGBD-UHFFFAOYSA-N; InChI=1/C4H6/c1-3-4-2/h1-2H3 Key: XNMQEEKYCVKGBD-UHFFFAOYAO
- SMILES: CC#CC

Properties
Chemical formula	C_{4}H_{6}
Molar mass	54.092 g·mol^{−1}
Density	0.691 g/mL
Melting point	−32 °C (−26 °F; 241 K)
Boiling point	27 °C (81 °F; 300 K)
- Except where otherwise noted, data are given for materials in their standard state (at 25 °C [77 °F], 100 kPa). verify (what is ?) Infobox references

2-Butyne (dimethylacetylene, crotonylene or but-2-yne) is an alkyne with chemical formula CH_{3}C≡CCH_{3}. Produced artificially, it is a colorless, volatile, pungent liquid at standard temperature and pressure.

2-Butyne is of interest to physical chemists because of its very low torsional barrier and the problem of determining that barrier using high-resolution infrared spectroscopy. Analysis of its infrared spectrum leads to a determination that the torsional barrier is only 6 cm^{−1} (1.2×10^{−22} J or 72 J mol^{−1}). However, it has not been determined whether the equilibrium structure is eclipsed (D_{3h}) or staggered (D_{3d}). Symmetry analysis using the Molecular Symmetry Group G_{36} shows that one would need to analyse its high resolution rotation-vibration Raman spectrum to determine its equilibrium structure. Pulsed-field-ionisation zero-kinetic-energy (PFI-ZEKE) photoelectron spectra of 2-butyne and its fully deuterated isotopomer have been recorded and analysed.

2-Butyne (dimethylethyne) forms with 5-decyne (dibutylethyne), 4-octyne (dipropylethyne) and 3-hexyne (diethylethyne) a group of symmetric alkynes.

== Synthesis ==
2-Butyne can be synthesized by the rearrangement reaction of ethylacetylene in a solution of ethanolic potassium hydroxide.

== Applications ==
2-Butyne, along with propyne, is used to synthesize alkylated hydroquinones in the total synthesis of Vitamin E.

== See also ==
- Acetylenedicarboxylic acid
- 1-Butyne, a position isomer
- 1,4-Butynediol
- Hexamethylbenzene, a product of 2-butyne trimerization
- Hexafluoro-2-butyne
