= 1-Butene =

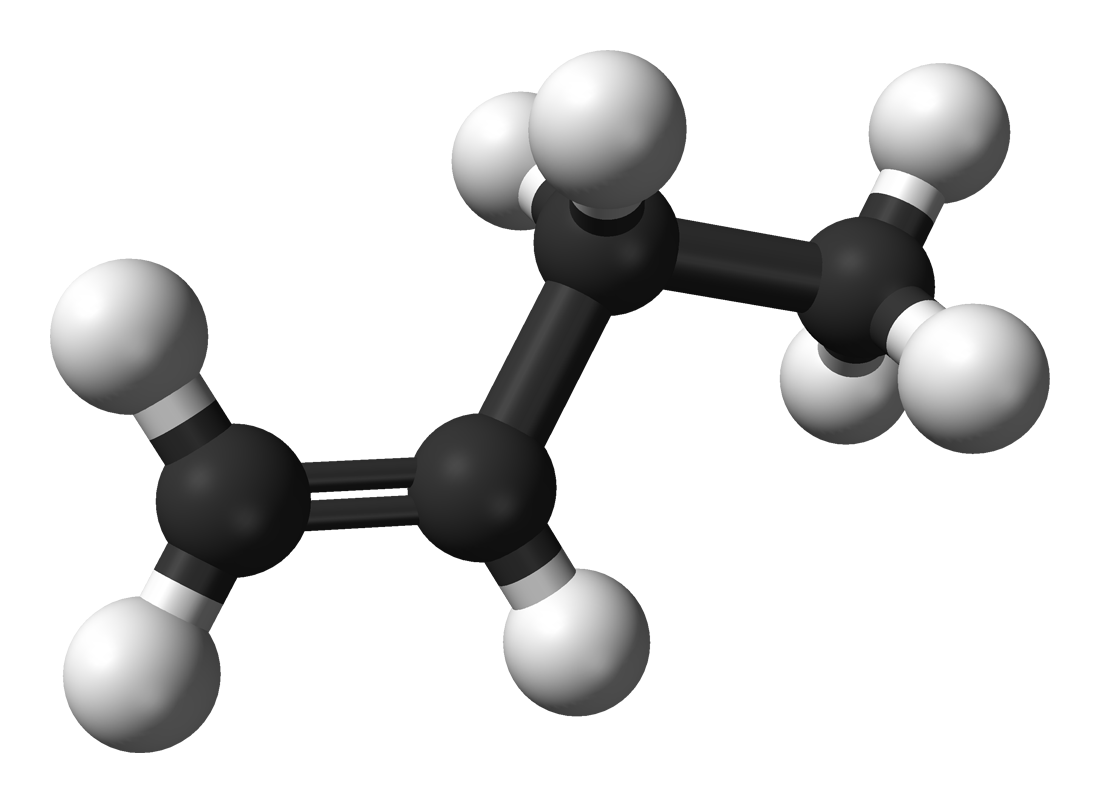

Names
- Preferred IUPAC name But-1-ene
- Other names Ethylethylene; 1-Butylene α-Butylene

Identifiers
CAS Number	106-98-9
3D model (JSmol)	Interactive image; Interactive image
Beilstein Reference	1098262
ChEBI	CHEBI:48362
ChEMBL	ChEMBL117210
ChemSpider	7556
ECHA InfoCard	100.003.137
EC Number	203-449-2
Gmelin Reference	25205
PubChem CID	7844
UNII	LY001N554L
UN number	1012
CompTox Dashboard (EPA)	DTXSID1026746
- InChI: InChI=1S/C4H8/c1-3-4-2/h3H,1,4H2,2H3 Key: VXNZUUAINFGPBY-UHFFFAOYSA-N; InChI=1/C4H8/c1-3-4-2/h3H,1,4H2,2H3 Key: VXNZUUAINFGPBY-UHFFFAOYAZ
- SMILES: C=CCC; CCC=C

Properties
Chemical formula	C_{4}H_{8}
Molar mass	56.108 g·mol^{−1}
Appearance	Colorless gas
Odor	slightly aromatic
Density	0.62 g/cm^{3}
Melting point	−185.3 °C (−301.5 °F; 87.8 K)
Boiling point	−6.47 °C (20.35 °F; 266.68 K)
Solubility in water	0.221 g/100 mL
Solubility	soluble in alcohol, ether, benzene
Refractive index (n_{D})	1.3962
Viscosity	7.76 Pa

Hazards
- GHS labelling
Pictograms	(GHS02: Flammable)
Signal word	Danger
Hazard statements	H220
Precautionary statements	P210, P377, P381, P403, P410+P403
NFPA 704 (fire diamond)	1 4 0
Flash point	−79 °C; −110 °F; 194 K
Autoignition temperature	385 °C (725 °F; 658 K)
Explosive limits	1.6–10%
- Except where otherwise noted, data are given for materials in their standard state (at 25 °C [77 °F], 100 kPa). verify (what is ?) Infobox references

1-Butene (IUPAC name: But-1-ene, also known as 1-butylene) is the organic compound with the formula CH_{3}CH_{2}CH=CH_{2}. It is a colorless gas, but easily condensed to give a colorless liquid. It is classified as a linear alpha-olefin (terminal alkene). It is one of the isomers of butene (butylene). It is a precursor to diverse products.

== Reactions ==
Polymerization of 1-butene gives polybutylene, which is used to make piping for domestic plumbing. Another application is as a comonomer in the production of certain kinds of polyethylene, such as linear low-density polyethylene (LLDPE). It has also been used as a precursor to polypropylene resins, butylene oxide, and butanone.

== Manufacturing ==
1-Butene is produced by separation from crude C_{4} refinery streams and by ethylene dimerization. The former affords a mixture of 1-and 2-butenes, while the latter affords only the terminal alkene. It is distilled to give a very high purity product. An estimated 12 billion kilograms were produced in 2011.
