= Sulfone =

Organosulfur compound of the form >S(=O)2

The structure of a sulfone

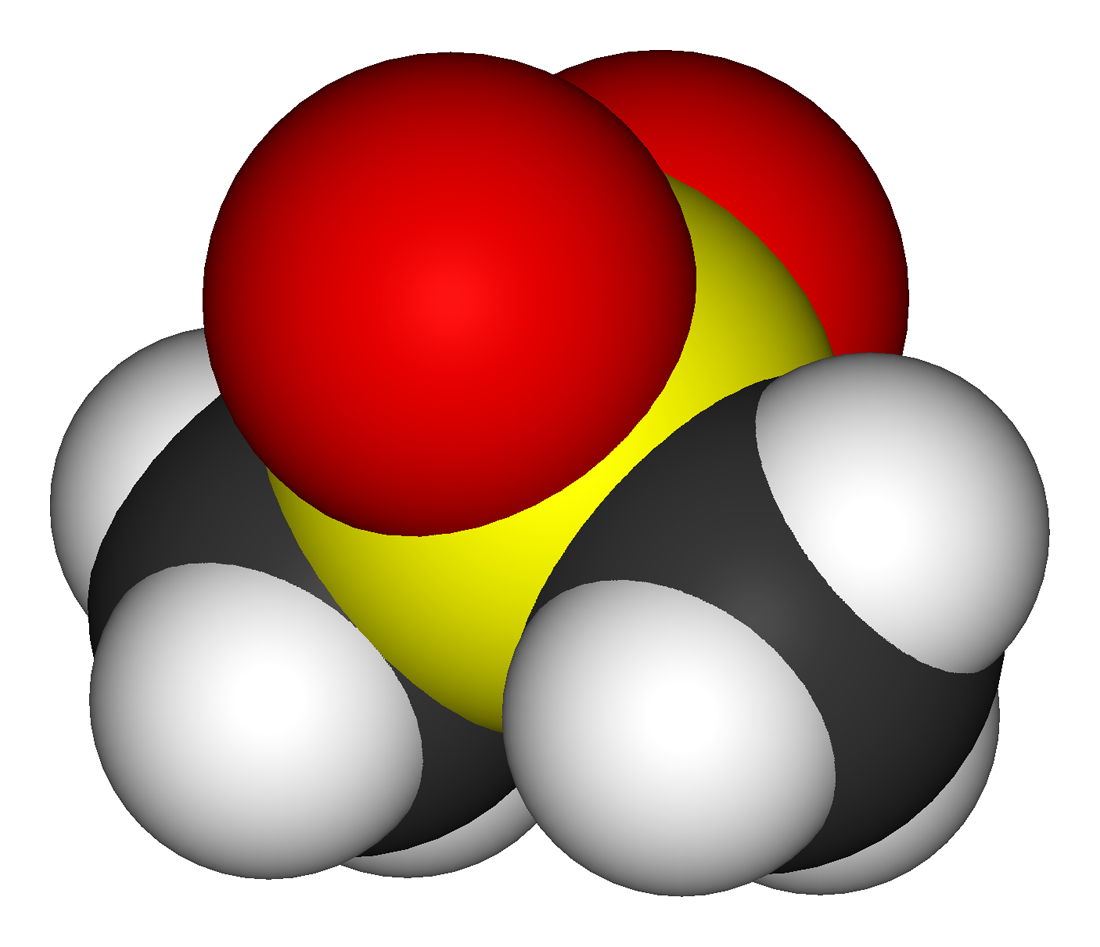
Dimethyl sulfone, an example of a sulfone

In organic chemistry, a sulfone is a organosulfur compound containing a sulfonyl (R−S(=O)_{2}−R') functional group attached to two carbon atoms. The central hexavalent sulfur atom is double-bonded to each of two oxygen atoms and has a single bond to each of two carbon atoms, usually in two separate hydrocarbon substituents.

== Synthesis and reactions ==
=== By oxidation of thioethers and sulfoxides ===
Sulfones are typically prepared by organic oxidation of thioethers, often referred to as sulfides. Sulfoxides are intermediates in this route. For example, dimethyl sulfide oxidizes to dimethyl sulfoxide and then to dimethyl sulfone.

=== From preformed SO_{2} moieties ===
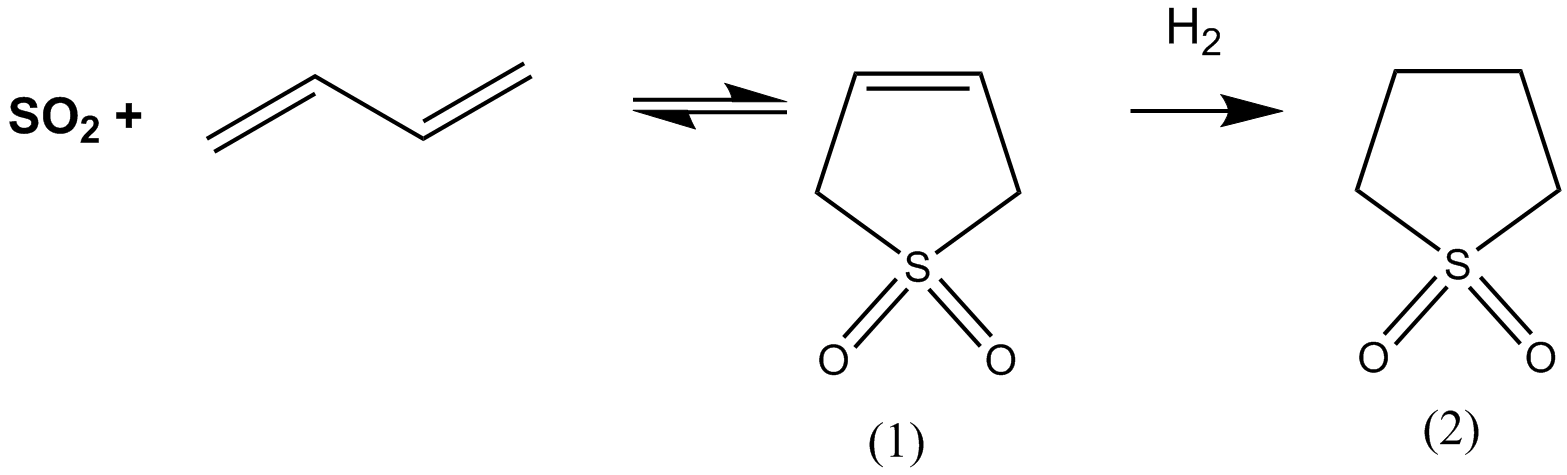
Synthesis of sulfolane by hydrogenation of sulfolene.

Sulfur dioxide participates in cycloaddition reactions with dienes. For example, the industrially useful solvent sulfolane is prepared by addition of sulfur dioxide to buta-1,3-diene followed by hydrogenation of the resulting sulfolene.

Sulfones are prepared under conditions used for Friedel–Crafts reactions using sources of RSO^{+}_{2} derived from sulfonyl halides and sulfonic acid anhydrides. Lewis acid catalysts such as AlCl_{3} and FeCl_{3} are required.

Sulfones have been prepared through sulfinate anion alkylation. S_{N}2 displacement of a wide variety of halides gives exclusively sulfones...
$$\ce{ArSO2Na  +  Ar'Cl  ->  Ar(Ar')SO2  +  NaCl}$$
...but some highly active alkylating agents give a sulfinate ester instead. The ester may or may not rearrange to the sulfone via dissociation-association. Absent a nucleophilic catalyst, sulfinate esters generally do not rearrange thermally to the sulfone, but allyl, propargyl, and benzyl sulfinates can rearrange when heated neat.

=== Reactions ===
A relatively inert functional group, sulfones are typically less oxidizing and only 4 bel more acidic than sulfoxides. They eventually eliminate to an alkene in base, but leave about 9 bel more slowly than chloride. In the Ramberg–Bäcklund reaction and the Julia olefination, sulfones eliminate sulfur dioxide to form an alkene.

Sulfones are strongly electron-withdrawing, and vinyl sulfones are electrophilic Michael acceptors.

The behavior of the α carbon depends on context. Non-nucleophilic bases deprotonate, giving an enolate-like carbanion. Contrariwise, Lewis acids on the sulfone oxygens give a Pummerer-like electrophile that undergoes nucleophilic substitution.

Sulfones can also undergo reductive desulfonylation.

== Applications ==
Sulfolane is used to extract valuable aromatic compounds from petroleum.

=== Polymers ===
Some polymers containing sulfone groups are useful engineering plastics. They exhibit high strength and resistance to oxidation, corrosion, high temperatures, and creep under stress. For example, some are valuable as replacements for copper in domestic hot water plumbing. Precursors to such polymers are the sulfones bisphenol S and 4,4′-dichlorodiphenyl sulfone.

=== Pharmacology ===
Dapsone, an antibiotic used for the treatment of leprosy.

Examples of sulfones in pharmacology include dapsone, a drug formerly used as an antibiotic to treat leprosy, dermatitis herpetiformis, tuberculosis, or pneumocystis pneumonia (PCP). Several of its derivatives, such as promin, have similarly been studied or actually been applied in medicine, but in general sulfones are of far less prominence in pharmacology than for example the sulfonamides.

== See also ==
- Organosulfur chemistry
- Sulfonanilide
- Sulfoxide
- Sulfonic acid (–OH substituent)
