= Ramberg =

Ramberg may refer to places in:

== Places ==
=== Germany ===
- Ramberg (Harz), a hill in Saxony-Anhalt
- Ramberg, a borough of Bergen, Upper Bavaria
- Ramberg, Rhineland-Palatinate, a village in Rhineland-Palatinate

=== Norway ===
- Ramberg, Aust-Agder, a village in Risør Municipality in Aust-Agder county
- Ramberg, Bø, a village in Bø Municipality in Nordland county
- Ramberg, Flakstad, a village in Flakstad Municipality in Nordland county
- Ramberg, Telemark, a village in Notodden Municipality in Telemark county
- Ramberg, Vestvågøy, a small village in Vestvågøy Municipality in Nordland county

== People ==
- Ramberg (surname), a list of people with the surname Ramberg

== Other ==
- Ramberg–Osgood relationship, a mathematical equation
- Ramberg–Bäcklund reaction, a chemical reaction
