= C4H6O2S =

The molecular formula C_{4}H_{6}O_{2}S (molar mass: 118.15 g/mol) may refer to:

- Vinyl sulfone
- Sulfolene, or butadiene sulfone
