= Dimethylsulfone reductase =

Identifiers
- EC no.: 1.8.1.17

Databases
- IntEnz: IntEnz view
- BRENDA: BRENDA entry
- ExPASy: NiceZyme view
- KEGG: KEGG entry
- MetaCyc: metabolic pathway
- PRIAM: profile
- PDB structures: RCSB PDB PDBe PDBsum
Search
- PMC: articles
- PubMed: articles
- NCBI: proteins

Dimethylsulfone reductase (EC 1.8.1.17) is an enzyme that catalyses the following chemical reaction

dimethyl sulfone
+ NADH
H^{+}
H_{2}O
H^{+}
H_{2}O
dimethyl sulfoxide
+ NAD^{+}

Dimethylsulfone reductase is a molybdoprotein which uses reduced nicotinamide adenine dinucleotide as its cofactor.
