= Dibromodiethyl sulfone =

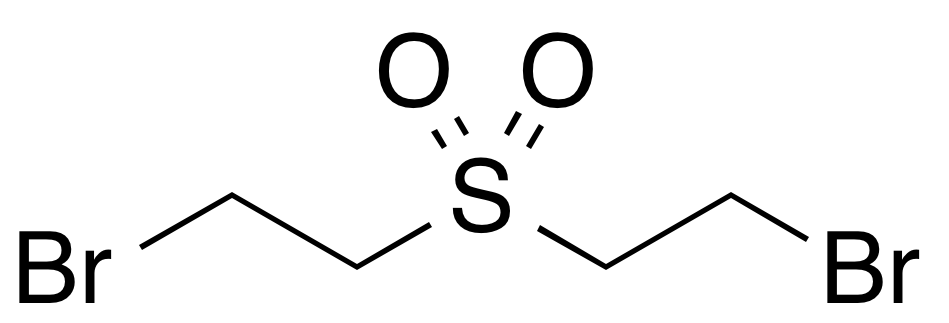

Names
- Preferred IUPAC name 1-Bromo-2-(2-bromoethane-1-sulfonyl)ethane

Identifiers
CAS Number	7617-67-6
3D model (JSmol)	Interactive image
ChEMBL	ChEMBL1966414
ChemSpider	122643
PubChem CID	139052
CompTox Dashboard (EPA)	DTXSID30227041
- InChI: InChI=1S/C4H8Br2O2S/c5-1-3-9(7,8)4-2-6/h1-4H2 Key: JASUZIAETLGSCB-UHFFFAOYSA-N
- SMILES: C(CBr)[S](=O)(=O)CCBr

Properties
Chemical formula	C_{4}H_{8}Br_{2}O_{2}S
Molar mass	279.97 g·mol^{−1}
Melting point	111.5 °C (232.7 °F; 384.6 K)

Hazards
- GHS labelling
Pictograms	(GHS05: Corrosive) (GHS07: Exclamation mark)
Signal word	Danger
Hazard statements	H302, H318
Precautionary statements	P264, P270, P280, P301+P312, P305+P351+P338, P310, P330, P501
- Except where otherwise noted, data are given for materials in their standard state (at 25 °C [77 °F], 100 kPa). Infobox references

Dibromodiethyl sulfone is a sulfone containing two 2-bromo-ethyl substituents.

== Production ==
Dibromodiethyl sulfone is produced from dibromodiethyl sulfide by oxidation by chromic acid.
