= Sulfolane =

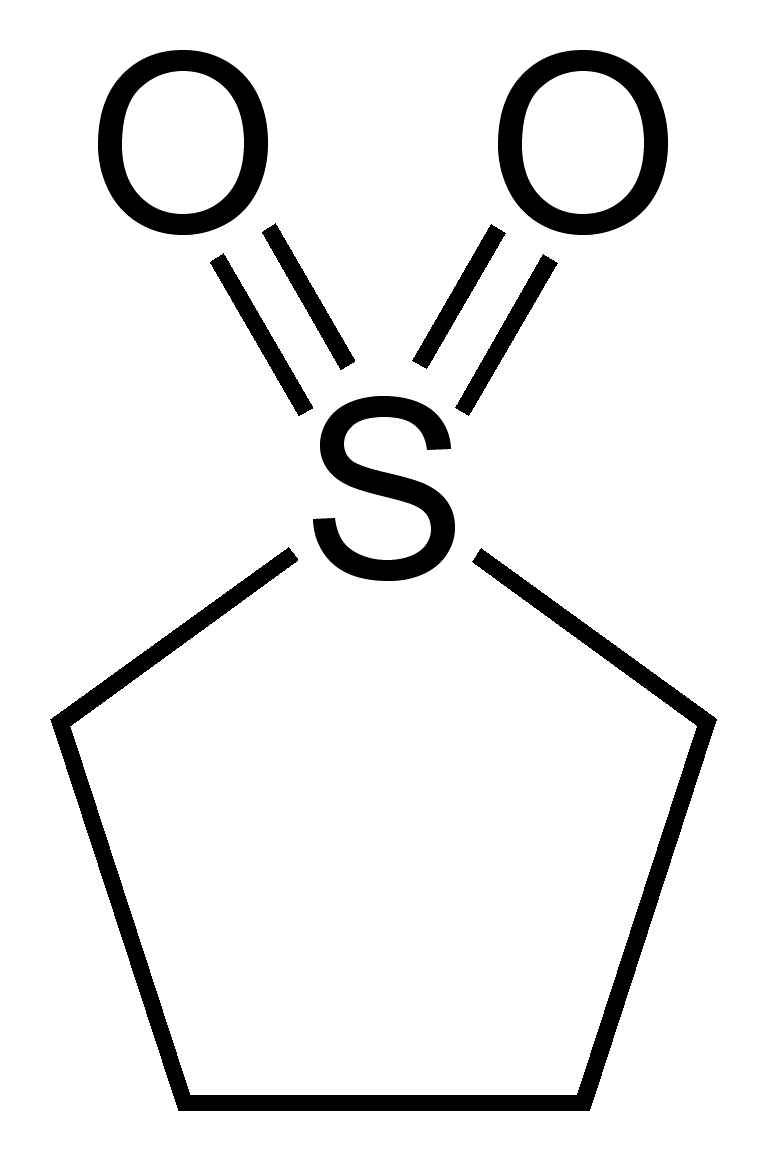
- Sulfolane

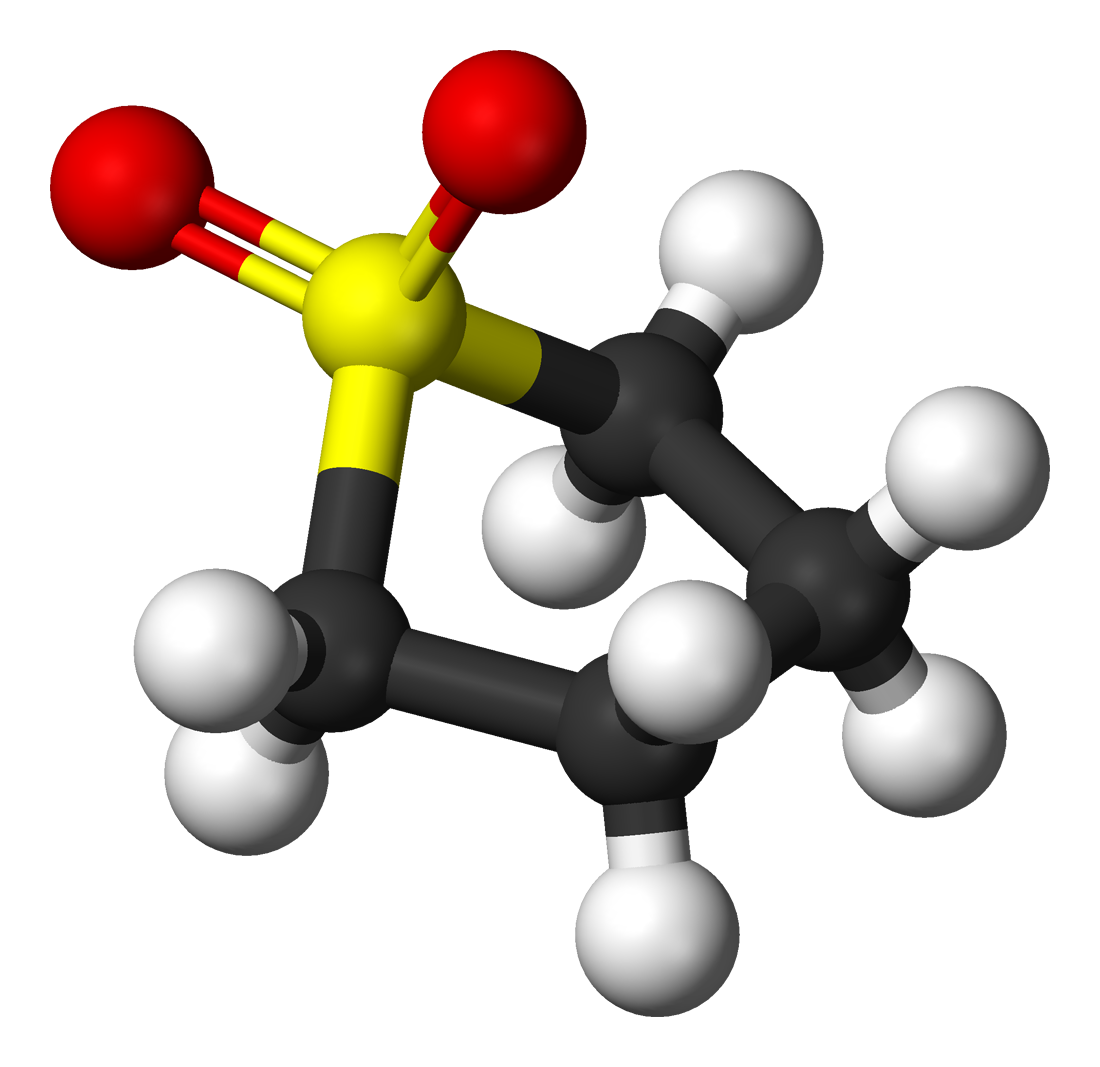
- Ball-and-stick model of the sulfolane molecule Carbon, C Hydrogen, H Oxygen, O Sulfur, S

Names
- Preferred IUPAC name 1𝜆^{6}-Thiolane-1,1-dione
- Other names: Sulfolane; Tetrahydrothiophene 1,1-dioxide; Tetramethylene sulfone

Identifiers
CAS Number	126-33-0
3D model (JSmol)	Interactive image
ChEBI	CHEBI:74794
ChEMBL	ChEMBL3186899
ChemSpider	29080
ECHA InfoCard	100.004.349
EC Number	204-783-1
PubChem CID	31347
RTECS number	XN0700000
UNII	Y5L06AH4G5
UN number	3334
CompTox Dashboard (EPA)	DTXSID3027037
- InChI: InChI=1S/C4H8O2S/c5-7(6)3-1-2-4-7/h1-4H2 Key: HXJUTPCZVOIRIF-UHFFFAOYSA-N; InChI=1/C4H8O2S/c5-7(6)3-1-2-4-7/h1-4H2 Key: HXJUTPCZVOIRIF-UHFFFAOYAA
- SMILES: C1CCS(=O)(=O)C1

Properties
Chemical formula	(CH_{2})_{4}SO_{2}
Molar mass	120.17 g·mol^{−1}
Appearance	Colorless liquid
Density	1.261 g/cm^{3}, liquid
Melting point	20–26 °C (68–79 °F; 293–299 K)
Boiling point	285 °C (545 °F; 558 K); 104 °C (219 °F; 377 K) (0.2 mmHg); (decomposes at 220 °C (428 °F; 493 K))
Solubility in water	100 g/L
log P	< 0 (20 °C (68 °F; 293 K))
Vapor pressure	0.01 mmHg (20 °C (68 °F; 293 K))
Viscosity	10.34 mPa·s (30 °C (86 °F; 303 K))

Structure
Dipole moment	4.35 D

Hazards
- GHS labelling
Pictograms	(GHS07: Exclamation mark) (GHS08: Health hazard)
Signal word	Danger
Hazard statements	H302, H360, H373
Precautionary statements	P201, P202, P260, P264, P270, P280, P301+P312+P330, P308+P313, P405, P501
NFPA 704 (fire diamond)	2 1 0
Flash point	177 °C (351 °F; 450 K)
Autoignition temperature	528 °C (982 °F; 801 K)
- Lethal dose or concentration (LD, LC)
LD_{50} (median dose)	1900 mg/kg (oral, mouse); >2000 mg/kg (dermal, rat)
LC_{50} (median concentration)	12 mg/L (inhalation, rat, 4h)

Related compounds
Related compounds	Methylsulfonylmethane; Tetrahydrothiophene; Sulfolene
- Except where otherwise noted, data are given for materials in their standard state (at 25 °C [77 °F], 100 kPa). verify (what is ?) Infobox references

Sulfolane (also tetramethylene sulfone, systematic name: 1𝜆^{6}-thiolane-1,1-dione) is an organosulfur compound, formally a cyclic sulfone, with the formula (CH_{2})_{4}SO_{2}. It is a colorless liquid commonly used in the chemical industry as a solvent for extractive distillation and chemical reactions. Sulfolane was originally developed by the Shell Oil Company in the 1960s as a solvent to purify butadiene. Sulfolane is a polar aprotic solvent, and it is miscible with water.

== Properties ==
Sulfolane is classified as a sulfone, a group of organosulfur compounds containing a sulfonyl functional group. The sulfone group is a sulfur atom doubly bonded to two oxygen atoms and singly bonded to two carbon centers. The sulfur-oxygen double bond is polar, conferring good solubility in water, while the four carbon ring provides non-polar stability. These properties allow it to be miscible in both water and hydrocarbons, resulting in its widespread use as a solvent for purifying hydrocarbon mixtures.

== Synthesis ==
The original method developed by the Shell Oil Company was to first allow butadiene to react with sulfur dioxide via a cheletropic reaction to give sulfolene. This was then hydrogenated using Raney nickel as a catalyst to give sulfolane.

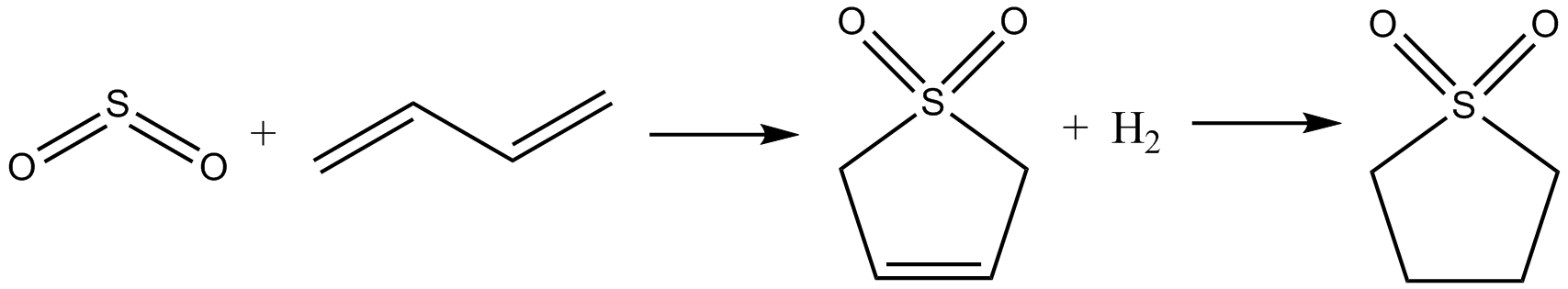

Shortly thereafter, it was discovered that both the product yield and the lifetime of the catalyst could be improved by adding hydrogen peroxide and then neutralizing to a pH of roughly 5-8 before hydrogenation. Developments have continued over the years, including in the catalysts used. Recently, it was found that Ni-B/MgO showed superior catalytic activity to that of Raney nickel and other common catalysts that have been used in the hydrogenation of sulfolene.

Other syntheses have also been developed, such as oxidizing tetrahydrothiophene with hydrogen peroxide. This reaction produces tetramethylene sulfoxide, which can then be further oxidized. Because the first oxidation occurs at low temperature and the second at higher temperature, the reaction can be controlled at each stage. This gives greater freedom for the manipulation of the reaction, which can potentially lead to higher yields and purity.

== Uses ==
Sulfolane is widely used as an industrial solvent, especially in the extraction of aromatic hydrocarbons from hydrocarbon mixtures and to purify natural gas. The first large scale commercial use of sulfolane, the sulfinol process, was first implemented by Shell Oil Company in March 1964 at the Person gas plant near Karnes City, Texas. The sulfinol process purifies natural gas by removing H_{2}S, CO_{2}, COS and mercaptans from natural gas with a mixture of alkanolamine and sulfolane.

Shortly after the sulfinol process was implemented, sulfolane was found to be highly effective in separating high purity aromatic compounds from hydrocarbon mixtures using liquid-liquid extraction. This process is widely used in refineries and the petrochemical industry. Because sulfolane is one of the most efficient industrial solvents for purifying aromatics, the process operates at a relatively low solvent-to-feed ratio, making sulfolane relatively cost effective compared to similar-purpose solvents. In addition, it is selective in a range that complements distillation; where sulfolane cannot separate two compounds, distillation easily can and vice versa, keeping sulfolane units useful for a wide range of compounds with minimal additional cost.

Whereas sulfolane is highly stable and can therefore be reused many times, it does eventually degrade into acidic byproducts. A number of measures have been developed to remove these byproducts, allowing the sulfolane to be reused and increase the lifetime of a given supply. Some methods that have been developed to regenerate spent sulfolane include vacuum and steam distillation, back extraction, adsorption, and anion-cation exchange resin columns.

Sulfolane is also added to hydrofluoric acid as a vapor suppressant, commonly for use in a refinery's alkylation unit. This "modified" hydrofluoric acid is less prone to vaporization if released in its liquid form.

== As a pollutant ==
Groundwater in parts of the city of North Pole, Alaska, has been contaminated with sulfolane due to pollution from a now-closed petroleum refinery. Due to this contamination, affected residents have been supplied with alternative potable water sources. Animal studies on the toxicity of sulfolane are ongoing, funded through the US federal government's National Toxicology Program. No long-term in vivo animal studies have been done, which prevents any firm conclusion as to whether sulfolane is a carcinogen, although in vitro studies have failed to demonstrate any cancerous changes in bacterial or animal cells. In animal studies, high doses of sulfolane have induced negative impacts on the central nervous system, including hyperactivity, convulsions and hypothermia; the impacts of lower doses, especially over the long-term, are still being studied.

== See also ==
- Sulfolene
- Tetrahydrothiophene
- Methylsulfonylmethane
