= Dichlorodiethyl sulfone =

Oxidation product of mustard gas

Names
- Preferred IUPAC name 1-Chloro-2-(2-chloroethane-1-sulfonyl)ethane
- Other names Bis(2-chloroethyl) sulfone, mustard sulfone, Yperite sulfone, H sulfone

Identifiers
CAS Number	471-03-4
3D model (JSmol)	Interactive image
ChemSpider	9705
PubChem CID	10109
UNII	DZ4S6T48FY
CompTox Dashboard (EPA)	DTXSID50197035
- InChI: InChI=1S/C4H8Cl2O2S/c5-1-3-9(7,8)4-2-6/h1-4H2 Key: LUYAMNYBNTVQJG-UHFFFAOYSA-N
- SMILES: C(CCl)S(=O)(=O)CCCl

Properties
Chemical formula	C_{4}H_{8}Cl_{2}O_{2}S
Molar mass	191.07 g·mol^{−1}
Melting point	52 °C (126 °F; 325 K)
Solubility	ethanol; ether; chloroform

Hazards
- GHS labelling
Pictograms	(GHS06: Toxic) (GHS07: Exclamation mark)
Signal word	Danger
Hazard statements	H301, H312
Precautionary statements	P264, P270, P280, P301+P310, P302+P352, P312, P321, P322, P330, P363, P405, P501

Related compounds
Related compounds	mustard gas, mustard sulfoxide; Dibromodiethyl sulfone
- Except where otherwise noted, data are given for materials in their standard state (at 25 °C [77 °F], 100 kPa). Infobox references

Dichlorodiethyl sulfone (or mustard sulfone) is an oxidation product of mustard gas. It has the formula (ClCH_{2}CH_{2})_{2}SO_{2}. Although it is irritating to the eyes, it is not nearly as bad as mustard gas (dichlorodiethyl sulfide).

== Structure ==
The all-trans arrangement is predicted by Hartree-Fock computational methods to be the most stable conformer.

== Reactions ==
When refluxed with aqueous sodium hydroxide, oxygen replaces the chlorine, and an 1,4-oxathiane ring is formed, p-oxathiane-4,4-dioxide. When treated with sodium carbonate, a weaker base, bis-(hydroxyethyl)sulfone is the major product formed. In comparison the dehydrochlorination of the sulfoxide is much slower.
