= Aliphatic compound =

Hydrocarbon compounds without aromatic rings

Acyclic aliphatic/non-aromatic compound (butane)

Cyclic aliphatic/non-aromatic compound (cyclobutane)

Aliphatic compounds (/ˌælɪˈfætɪk/; G. aleiphar, fat, oil) are chemical compounds containing the element carbon that are not aromatic compounds. Aliphatic compounds can be saturated, where all C-C bonds are single bonds (e.g., hexane), or unsaturated, where double or triple bonds are present between carbon atoms (e.g., hexene, hexyne).

== Other definitions ==
The definition given above is that promulgated by the International Union of Pure and Applied Chemistry (IUPAC), which sets accepted definitions for chemical terms and nomenclature. Other sources have previously applied additional restrictions, such as stating that only hydrocarbons (compounds made of only carbon and hydrogen) can be aliphatic or excluding cyclic compounds from being aliphatic. These criteria are not present in the current IUPAC definition.

== Structure ==
Aliphatic compounds can be saturated, i.e. alkanes (single carbon-carbon bonds), or unsaturated, with carbon-carbon double (alkenes) or triple bonds (alkynes). It may also be cyclic (as long as it is not aromatic).

Under definitions which require that aliphatic compounds are strictly hydrocarbons, the addition of other elements beyond carbon and hydrogen (heteroatoms) makes the compound no longer aliphatic. Nevertheless, such compounds are sometimes still referred to as aliphatic if the hydrocarbon portion of the molecule is aliphatic, e.g. aliphatic amines, to differentiate them from aromatic amines.

The least complex aliphatic compound is methane (CH_{4}).

== Properties ==
Most aliphatic compounds are flammable, allowing the use of hydrocarbons as fuel, such as methane in natural gas for stoves or heating; butane in torches and lighters; various aliphatic (as well as aromatic) hydrocarbons in liquid transportation fuels like petrol/gasoline, diesel, and jet fuel; and other uses such as ethyne (acetylene) in welding.

== Examples ==
A few examples of aliphatic compounds is listed below (sorted by the number of carbon-atoms).

Formula	Name	Structural formula	Chemical classification
CH_{4}	Methane		Alkane
C_{2}H_{2}	Acetylene		Alkyne
C_{2}H_{4}	Ethylene		Alkene
C_{2}H_{6}	Ethane		Alkane
C_{3}H_{4}	Propadiene		Diene
C_{3}H_{4}	Propyne		Alkyne
C_{3}H_{6}	Propylene		Alkene
C_{3}H_{8}	Propane		Alkane
C_{4}H_{6}	1,2-Butadiene		Diene
C_{4}H_{6}	1-Butyne		Alkyne
C_{4}H_{8}	1-Butene		Alkene
C_{4}H_{10}	Butane		Alkane
C_{5}H_{12}	Pentane		Alkane
C_{6}H_{10}	Cyclohexene		Cycloalkene
C_{6}H_{12}	Cyclohexane		Cycloalkane
C_{6}H_{14}	Hexane		Alkane
C_{7}H_{14}	Methylcyclohexane		Cycloalkane
C_{8}H_{8}	Cubane		Prismane, Platonic hydrocarbon
C_{8}H_{18}	Octane		Alkane
C_{10}H_{12}	Dicyclopentadiene		Diene, Cycloalkene
C_{10}H_{16}	Terpinene		Terpene, Diene, Cycloalkene
C_{10}H_{16}	Phellandrene		Terpene, Diene, Cycloalkene
C_{10}H_{16}	Limonene		Terpene, Diene, Cycloalkene
C_{10}H_{22}	Decane		Alkane
C_{30}H_{50}	Squalene		Terpene, Polyene
C_{2n}H_{4n}	Polyethylene		Alkane
