= Versatile peroxidase =

Enzyme

Identifiers
- EC no.: 1.11.1.16
- CAS no.: 42613-30-9

Databases
- IntEnz: IntEnz view
- BRENDA: BRENDA entry
- ExPASy: NiceZyme view
- KEGG: KEGG entry
- MetaCyc: metabolic pathway
- PRIAM: profile
- PDB structures: RCSB PDB PDBe PDBsum
Search
- PMC: articles
- PubMed: articles
- NCBI: proteins

Versatile peroxidase (EC 1.11.1.16, VP, hybrid peroxidase, polyvalent peroxidase) is an enzyme with systematic name reactive-black-5:hydrogen-peroxide oxidoreductase. This enzyme catalyses the following chemical reaction

(1) Reactive Black 5 + H_{2}O_{2} $\rightleftharpoons$ oxidized Reactive Black 5 + 2 H_{2}O
(2) donor + H_{2}O_{2} $\rightleftharpoons$ oxidized donor + 2 H_{2}O

Versatile peroxidase is a hemoprotein.
