= Ramberg (surname) =

Ramberg is a German surname. Notable people with the surname include:

- Arthur von Ramberg (1819–1875), Austrian artist
- Christina Ramberg (1946–1995), American artist
- Edward Ramberg (1907–1995), American physicist
- Georg von Ramberg, Austrian field marshal lieutenant
- Hermann von Ramberg (1820–1899), Austrian cavalry general
- Ian Ramberg (1997–2012), American pilot
- Jan Ramberg (1932–2018), Swedish professor emeritus
- JJ Ramberg, host of MSNBC's weekend business program Your Business
- Johann Daniel Ramberg (1732–1820), Austrian architect
- Johann Heinrich Ramberg (1763–1840), German artist
- Ludwig Ramberg (1874–1940), Swedish chemist
- Örjan Ramberg (born 1948), Swedish actor
