= Ramberg–Bäcklund reaction =

Chemical reaction

Named after	Ludwig Ramberg; Birger Bäcklund
Reaction type	Rearrangement reaction

Identifiers
Organic Chemistry Portal	ramberg-baecklund-reaction
RSC ontology ID	RXNO:0000094

The Ramberg–Bäcklund reaction is an organic reaction converting an α-halo sulfone into an alkene in presence of a base with extrusion of sulfur dioxide. The reaction is named after the two Swedish chemists Ludwig Ramberg and Birger Bäcklund. The carbanion formed by deprotonation gives an unstable episulfone that decomposes with elimination of sulfur dioxide. This elimination step is considered to be a concerted cheletropic extrusion.

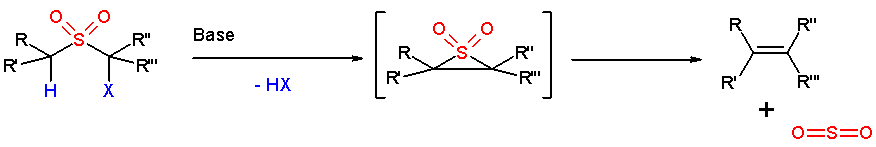
Scheme 1. The Ramberg–Bäcklund reaction

The overall transformation is the conversion of the carbon–sulfur bonds to a carbon–carbon double bond.

== Applications ==
Similar to the related Favorskii rearrangement, the Ramberg–Bäcklund reaction can synthesize strained rings. Thus the reaction can make small cis cycloalkenes...

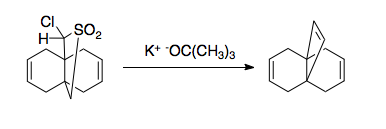
Scheme 3. Small-ring application of the Ramberg–Bäcklund reaction

...and medium-sized trans cycloalkenes:

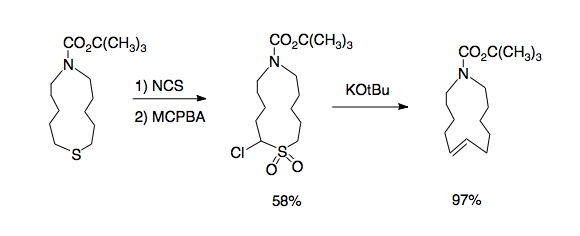
Scheme 4. Small-ring application of the Ramberg–Bäcklund reaction

This reaction type gives access to 1,2-dimethylenecyclohexane

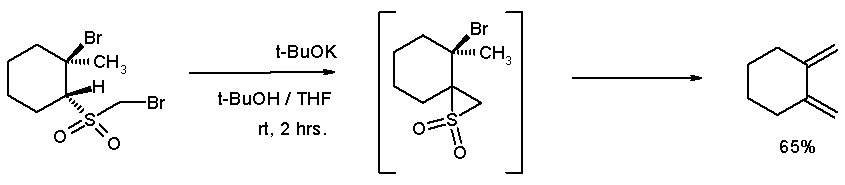
Scheme 5. Ramberg–Bäcklund synthesis of dimethylene-cyclohexane

Sufficiently activated leaving groups can replace the halogen. The epoxide variation develops allyl alcohols:

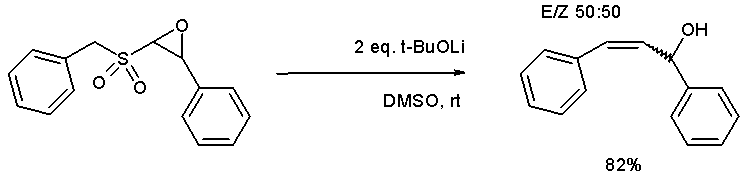

A recently developed application of the Ramberg–Bäcklund reaction is the synthesis of C-glycosides. The required thioethers can be prepared easily by exchange with a thiol. The application of the Ramberg–Bäcklund conditions then leads to an exocyclic vinyl ether that can be reduced to the C-nucleoside.

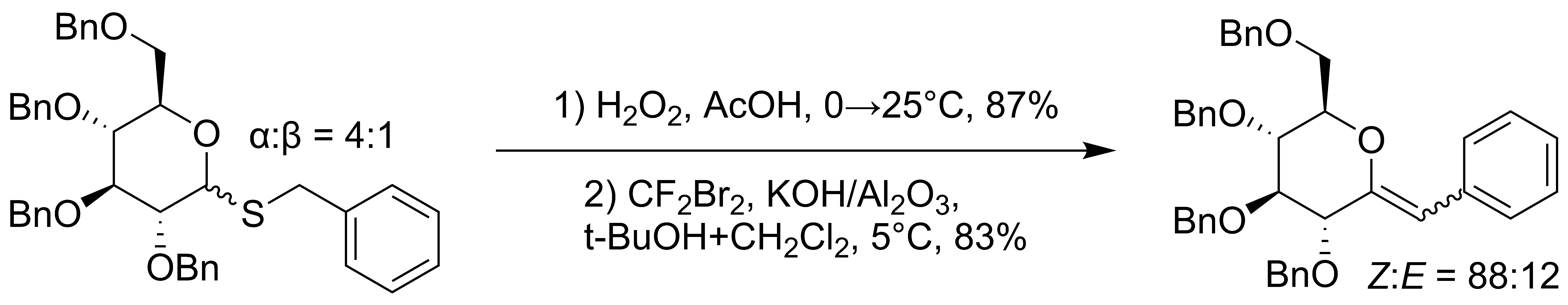

== Substrates ==
The original procedure involved halogenation of a sulfide, followed by oxidation to the sulfone. Peracids such as meta-chloroperbenzoic acid oxidize sulfides takes place selectively in the presence of alkenes and alcohols. α-Halo sulfides may in turn be synthesized through the treatment of sulfides with halogen electrophiles such as N-chlorosuccinimide or N-bromosuccinimide.

Recently, the preferred method has reversed the order of the steps. After the oxidation, which is normally done with a peroxy acid, halogenation is done under basic conditions by use of dibromodifluoromethane for the halogen transfer step. This method was used to synthesize 1,8-diphenyl-1,3,5,7-octatetraene.

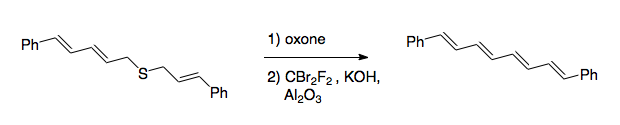
Scheme 2. Using the Ramberg–Bäcklund reaction to synthesize 1,8-diphenyl-1,3,5,7-octatetraene

== Mechanism ==
The sulfone group contains an acidic proton in one of the α-positions which is abstracted by a strong base. The negative charge placed on this position (formally a carbanion) is transferred to the halogen residing on the other α-position in a nucleophilic displacement temporarily forming a three-membered cyclic sulfone. This intermediate is unstable and releases sulfur dioxide to form the alkene. Mixtures of cis isomer and trans isomer are usually obtained.

The Favorskii rearrangement and the Eschenmoser sulfide contraction are conceptually related reactions.
