= Butadiene (data page) =

Chemical data page

This page provides supplementary chemical data on 1,3-butadiene.

Properties
General
Name	1,3-Butadiene
CH_{2}=CH-CH=CH_{2}
Chemical formula	C_{4}H_{6}
Molar mass	54.09 g/mol
Synonyms	butadiene, biethylene, divinyl, erythrene, vinylethylene
CAS number	106-99-0
Phase behavior
Melting point	164.3 K (-108.9 °C)
Boiling point	268.8 K (-4.4 °C)
Triple point	164.2 K (-109.0 °C) ? bar
Critical point	425 K (152 °C) 43.2 bar
Structure
Symmetry group	C_{2h}
Gas properties
Δ_{f}H^{0}	110.2 kJ/mol
S^{0}	? J/mol·K
C_{p}	79.5 J/mol·K
Liquid properties
Δ_{f}H^{0}	90.5 kJ/mol
S^{0}	199.0 J/mol·K
C_{p}	123.6 J/mol·K
Liquid density	0.64 ×10^{3} kg/m^{3}
Safety
Acute effects	Possible irritation to skin and mucous membranes. Inhalation of concentrated vapors causes drowsiness and CNS depression.
Chronic effects	Possible carcinogen.
Flash point	-85 °C
Autoignition temperature	418 °C
Explosive limits	2-12%
More info
Properties	NIST WebBook
MSDS	ICSC 0017
SI units were used where possible. Unless otherwise stated, standard conditions were used. Disclaimer and references
