= Dibromodiethyl sulfoxide =

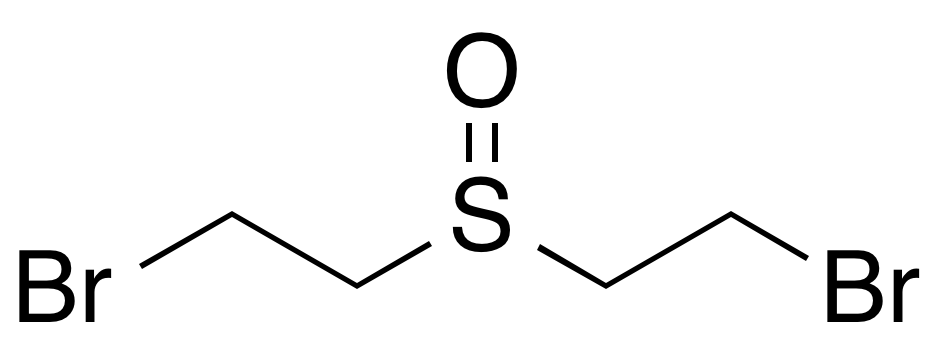

Names
- Preferred IUPAC name 1-Bromo-2-(2-bromoethane-1-sulfinyl)ethane

Identifiers
3D model (JSmol)	Interactive image
ChemSpider	498269
PubChem CID	573101
- InChI: InChI=1S/C4H8Br2OS/c5-1-3-8(7)4-2-6/h1-4H2 Key: DRXUQRIPMTVDCS-UHFFFAOYSA-N
- SMILES: C(CBr)S(=O)CCBr

Properties
Chemical formula	C_{4}H_{8}Br_{2}OS
Molar mass	263.98 g·mol^{−1}
- Except where otherwise noted, data are given for materials in their standard state (at 25 °C [77 °F], 100 kPa). Infobox references

Dibromodiethyl sulfoxide is a sulfoxide (S=O) containing two 2-bromo-ethyl substituents.

== Production ==
Dibromodiethyl sulfoxide is produced from dibromodiethyl sulfide by oxidation by benzoyl peroxide.
