= Dibromodiethyl sulfide =

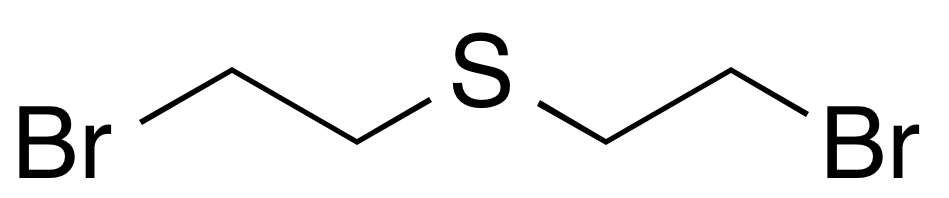

Names
- Preferred IUPAC name 1-Bromo-2-[(2-bromoethyl)sulfanyl]ethane
- Other names Di(2-Bromoethyl) sulfide; bis(beta-bromethyl)sulfide; 2,2'-dibromodiethyl sulfide

Identifiers
CAS Number	7617-64-3
3D model (JSmol)	Interactive image
ChemSpider	84005
PubChem CID	93053
CompTox Dashboard (EPA)	DTXSID70227040
- InChI: InChI=1S/C4H8Br2S/c5-1-3-7-4-2-6/h1-4H2 Key: YYWACUFAVLSCPF-UHFFFAOYSA-N
- SMILES: C(CBr)SCCBr

Properties
Density	1.838
Boiling point	258.3 °C (496.9 °F; 531.5 K)
Refractive index (n_{D})	1.566

Hazards
Flash point	110 °C (230 °F; 383 K)

Related compounds
Related compounds	Dibromodiethyl sulfoxide
- Except where otherwise noted, data are given for materials in their standard state (at 25 °C [77 °F], 100 kPa). Infobox references

Dibromodiethyl sulfide is a chemical like mustard gas in which bromine replaces chlorine. It is very irritating as a vapour.

== Production ==
Dibromodiethyl sulfide can be produced by the reaction of bromine with thiodiglycol.

== Properties ==
Dibromodiethyl sulfide takes the form of white crystals. The melting point is between 31 and 34°C. It decomposes when heated to 240°C.

The fungus Tyromyces palustris can split the molecule at the sulfur.
