= Vinyl sulfone =

Identifiers
CAS Number	77-77-0
3D model (JSmol)	Interactive image
ChEBI	CHEBI:53729
ChEMBL	ChEMBL349205
ChemSpider	6251
EC Number	201-057-6
Gmelin Reference	558721
PubChem CID	6496
UNII	5PFN71LP8M
UN number	2810 (DIVINYL SULFONE)
- InChI: InChI=1S/C4H6O2S/c1-3-7(5,6)4-2/h3-4H,1-2H2 Key: AFOSIXZFDONLBT-UHFFFAOYSA-N
- SMILES: C=CS(=O)(=O)C=C

Properties
Chemical formula	C_{4}H_{6}O_{2}S
Molar mass	118.15 g·mol^{−1}
Appearance	colorless oil
Density	1.177 g cm^{−3}
Melting point	-26 °C
Boiling point	90–92 °C (194–198 °F; 363–365 K) 8 mmHg

Hazards
- GHS labelling
Pictograms	(GHS05: Corrosive) (GHS06: Toxic) (GHS07: Exclamation mark) (GHS08: Health hazard)
Signal word	Danger
Hazard statements	H300, H310, H314, H315, H335, H341
Precautionary statements	P203, P260, P262, P264, P264+P265, P270, P271, P280, P301+P316, P301+P330+P331, P302+P352, P302+P361+P354, P304+P340, P305+P354+P338, P316, P317, P318, P319, P321, P330, P332+P317, P361+P364, P362+P364, P363, P403+P233, P405, P501
- Except where otherwise noted, data are given for materials in their standard state (at 25 °C [77 °F], 100 kPa). Infobox references

A vinyl sulfone is an organic compound with the formula O_{2}S(CH=CH_{2})_{2}. The molecule consisting of two vinyl groups bonded to a sulfone. It is the parent of several vinyl sulfones of the type O_{2}S(CH=CH_{2})R. Many vinyl sulfones are known.

== Vinyl sulfones ==
Examples include phenyl vinyl sulfone, methyl vinyl sulfone, and ethyl vinyl sulfone.

== Preparation ==
Divinyl sulfone is prepared from the diacetate bis(2-hydroxyethyl)sulfide. Oxidation of this diester with hydrogen peroxide gives the sulfone. The sulfone is then pyrolyzed to induce elimination of two equivalents of acetic acid:

(AcOCH_{2}CH_{2})_{2}SO_{2} → (CH_{2}=CH)_{2}SO_{2} + 2 HOAc (Ac = acetyl)

Other vinyl sulfones are prepared analogously to the vinyl sulfone, i.e. by H_{2}O_{2}-oxidation of the sulfide.

== Reactions and uses ==
Vinyl sulfones are dienophiles. Subsequent to the cycloaddition to a vinyl sulfone, the phenylsulfonyl group can be removed by reduction with zinc.

Vinyl sulfones are Michael acceptors. Vinyl sulfones add thiols, such as cysteine residues. This same reactive nature is responsible for their major industrial use in vinyl sulfone dyes.

Phenyl vinyl sulfone has been applied to ruthenium chemistry as part of olefin metathesis reactions.

Vinyl sulfone has applications to protein purification, especially when linked with mercaptoethanol.

== Commercial applications ==
Vinyl sulfone has uses as a molluscicide pesticide.

== Safety ==
Like similar compounds, vinyl sulfone is a lacrymator and skin irritant. These properties are somewhat mitigated because of its low volatility.
