= Sulfolene =

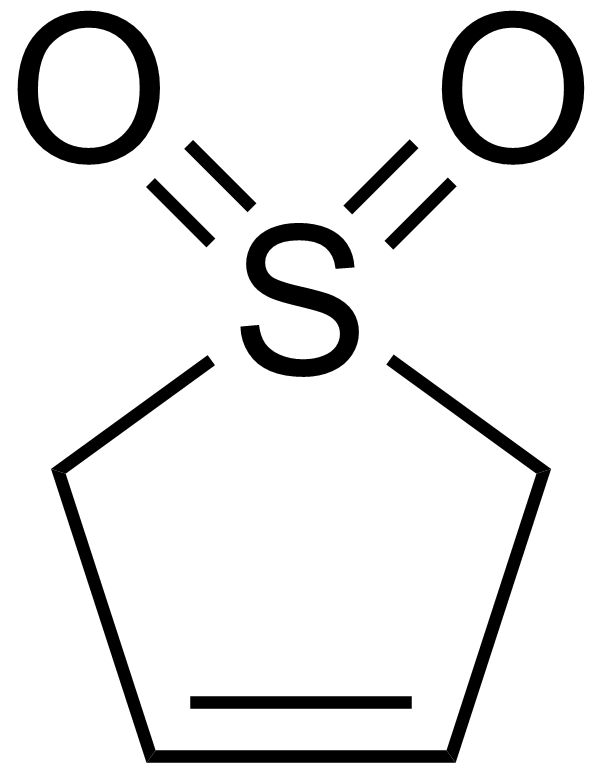

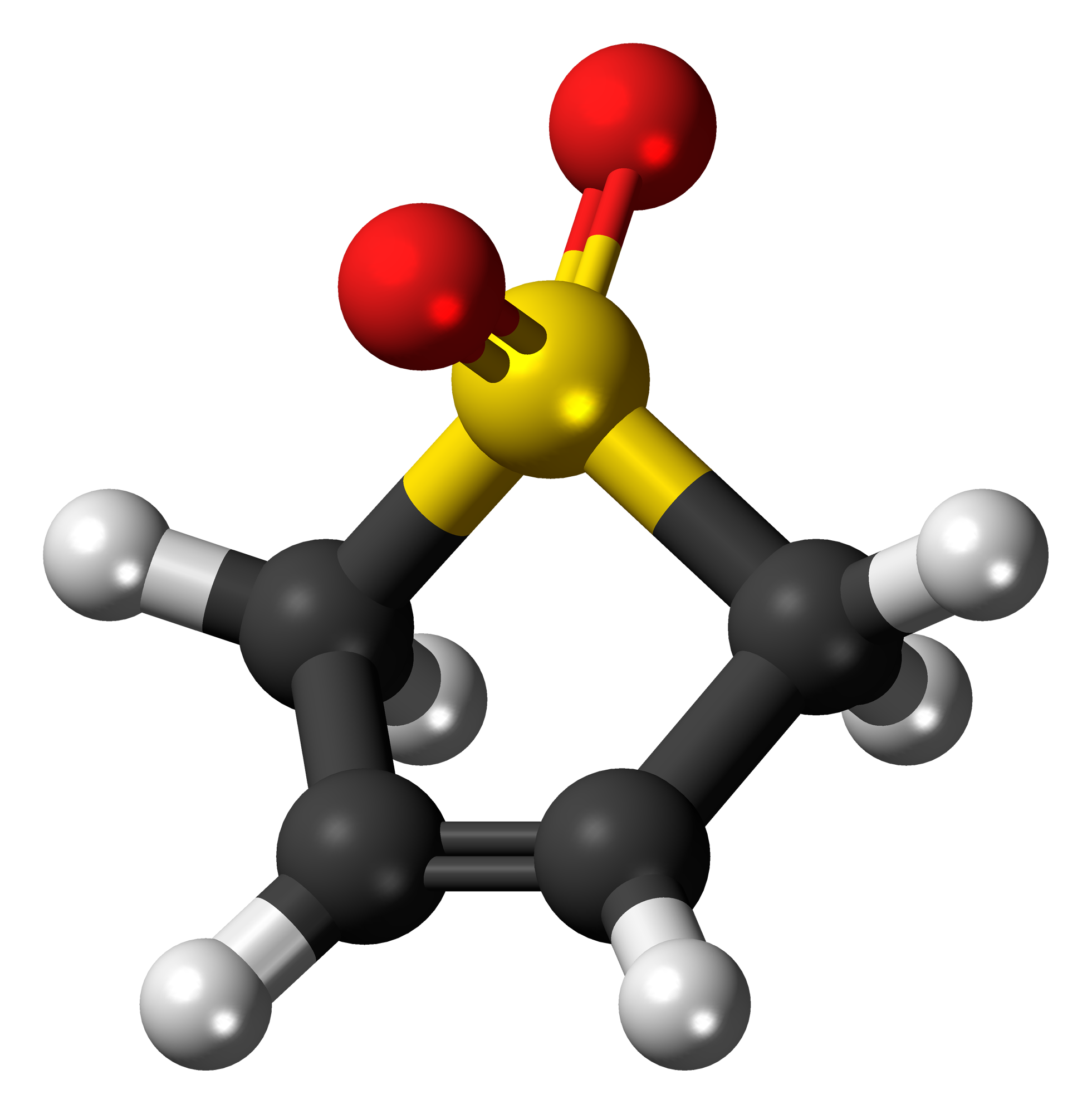

Names
- Preferred IUPAC name 2,5-Dihydro-1H-1λ^{6}-thiophene-1,1-dione
- Other names 2,5-Dihydrothiophene 1,1-dioxide Butadiene sulfone 3-Sulfolene

Identifiers
CAS Number	77-79-2
3D model (JSmol)	Interactive image
ChEBI	CHEBI:194619
ChEMBL	ChEMBL3182104
ChemSpider	6253
ECHA InfoCard	100.000.964
EC Number	201-059-7
PubChem CID	6498
UNII	Z6003L44MN
CompTox Dashboard (EPA)	DTXSID6021294
- InChI: InChI=1S/C4H6O2S/c5-7(6)3-1-2-4-7/h1-2H,3-4H2 Key: MBDNRNMVTZADMQ-UHFFFAOYSA-N
- SMILES: C1C=CCS1(=O)=O

Properties
Chemical formula	C_{4}H_{6}O_{2}S
Molar mass	118.15 g·mol^{−1}
Melting point	65 to 66 °C (149 to 151 °F; 338 to 339 K)

Hazards
- GHS labelling
Pictograms	(GHS05: Corrosive) (GHS07: Exclamation mark)
Signal word	Danger
Hazard statements	H318
Precautionary statements	P264+P265, P280, P305+P351+P338, P305+P354+P338, P317, P337+P317
- Except where otherwise noted, data are given for materials in their standard state (at 25 °C [77 °F], 100 kPa). Infobox references

Sulfolene, or butadiene sulfone is a cyclic organic chemical with a sulfone functional group. It is a white, odorless, crystalline, indefinitely storable solid, which dissolves in water and many organic solvents. The compound is used as a source of butadiene.

== Production ==
Synthesis of sulfolene

Sulfolene is formed by the cheletropic reaction between butadiene and sulfur dioxide. The reaction is typically conducted in an autoclave. Small amounts of hydroquinone or pyrogallol are added to inhibit polymerization of the diene. The reaction proceeds at room temperature over the course of days. At 130 °C, only 30 minutes are required. An analogous procedure gives the isoprene-derived sulfone.

== Reactions ==
=== Acid-base reactivity ===
The compound is unaffected by acids. It can even be recrystallized from conc. HNO_{3}.

The protons in the 2- and 5-positions rapidly exchange with deuterium oxide under alkaline conditions. Sodium cyanide catalyzes this reaction.

=== Isomerization to 2-sulfolene ===
In the presence of base or cyanide, 3-sulfolene isomerizes to a mixture of 2-sulfolene and 3-sulfolene.

At 50 °C an equilibrium mixture is obtained containing 42% 3-sulfolene and 58% 2-sulfolene. The thermodynamically more stable 2-sulfolene can be isolated from the mixture of isomers as pure substance in the form of white plates (m.p. 48-49 °C) by heating for several days at 100 °C, because of the thermal decomposition of the 3-sulfolene at temperatures above 80 °C.

=== Hydrogenation ===
Catalytic hydrogenation yields sulfolane, a solvent used in the petrochemical industry for the extraction of aromatics from hydrocarbon streams. The hydrogenation of 3-sulfolene over Raney nickel at approx. 20 bar and 60 °C gives sulfolane in yields of up to 65% only because of the poisoning of the catalyst by sulfur compounds.

=== Halogenation ===
3-Sulfolene reacts in aqueous solution with bromine to give 3,4-dibromotetrohydrothiophene-1,1-dioxide, which can be dehydrobrominated to thiophene-1,1-dioxide with silver carbonate.

Thiophene-1,1-dioxide, a highly reactive species, is also accessible via the formation of 3,4-bis(dimethylamino)tetrahydrothiophene-1,1-dioxide and successive double quaternization with methyl iodide and Hofmann elimination with silver hydroxide. A less cumbersome two-step synthesis is the two-fold dehydrobromination of 3,4-dibromotetrohydrothiophene-1,1-dioxide with either powdered sodium hydroxide in tetrahydrofuran (THF) or with ultrasonically dispersed metallic potassium.

=== Diels-Alder reactions ===
3-sulfolene is mainly valued as a stand-in for butadiene. The in situ production and immediate consumption of 1,3-butadiene largely avoids contact with the diene, which is a gas at room temperature. One potential drawback, aside from expense, is that the evolved sulfur dioxide can cause side reactions with acid-sensitive substrates.

Diels-Alder reaction between 1,3-butadiene and dienophiles of low reactivity usually requires prolonged heating above 100 °C. Such procedures are rather dangerous. If neat butadiene is used, special equipment for work under elevated pressure is required. With sulfolene no buildup of butadiene pressure could be expected as the liberated diene is consumed in the cycloaddition, and therefore the equilibrium of the reversible extrusion reaction acts as an internal "safety valve".

3-Sulfolene reacts with maleic anhydride in boiling xylene to cis-4-cyclohexene-1,2-dicarboxylic anhydride, obtaining yields of up to 90%.

3-Sulfolene reacts also with dienophiles in trans configuration (such as diethyl fumarate) at 110 °C with SO_{2} elimination in 66–73% yield to the trans-4-cyclohexene-1,2-dicarboxylic diethyl ester.

6,7-Dibromo-1,4-epoxy-1,4-dihydronaphthalene (6,7-Dibromonaphthalene-1,4-endoxide, accessible after debromination from 1,2,4,5-tetrabromobenzene using an equivalent of n-butyllithium and Diels-Alder reaction in furan in 70% yield) reacts with 3-sulfolene in boiling xylene to give a tricyclic adduct. This precursor yields, after treatment with perchloric acid, a dibromo dihydroanthracene which is dehydrogenated in the last step with 2,3-dichloro-5,6-dicyano-1,4-benzoquinone (DDQ) to 2,3-dibromoanthracene.

1,3-Butadiene (formed in the retro-cheletrophic reaction of 3-sulfolene) reacts with dehydrobenzene (benzyne, obtained by thermal decomposition of benzenediazonium-2-carboxylate) in a Diels-Alder reaction in 9% yield to give 1,4-dihydronaphthalene.

=== 2- and 3-Sulfolenes as a dienophile ===
In the presence of very reactive dienes (for example 1,3-diphenylisobenzofuran) butadienesulfone behaves as a dienophile and forms the corresponding Diels-Alder adduct.

As early as 1938, Kurt Alder and co-workers reported Diels-Alder adducts from the isomeric 2-sulfolene with 1,3-butadiene and 2-sulfolene with cyclopentadiene.

=== Other cycloadditions ===
The base-catalyzed reaction of 3-sulfolene with carbon dioxide at 3 bar pressure produces 3-sulfolene-3-carboxylic acid in 45% yield.

With diazomethane, 3-sulfolene forms a 1,3-dipolar cycloadduct:

=== Polymerization ===
In 1935, H. Staudinger and co-workers found that the reaction of butadiene and SO_{2} at room temperature gives a second product in addition to 3-sulfolene. This second product is an amorphous solid polymer. By free-radical polymerization of 3-sulfolene in peroxide-containing diethyl ether, up to 50% insoluble high-molecular-weight poly-sulfolene was obtained. The polymer resists degradation by sulfuric and nitric acids.

In subsequent investigations, polymerization of 3-sulfolene was initiated above 100 °C with the radical initiator azobis(isobutyronitrile) (AIBN). 3-sulfolene does not copolymerize with vinyl compounds, however. On the other hand, 2-sulfolene does not homopolymerize, but forms copolymers with vinyl compounds, e.g. acrylonitrile and vinyl acetate.

=== 3-Sulfolene as a recyclable solvent ===
The reversibility of the interconversion of 3-sulfolene with buta-1,3-diene and sulfur dioxide suggests the use of sulfolene as a recyclable aprotic dipolar solvent, in replacement for dimethyl sulfoxide (DMSO), which is often used but difficult to separate and poorly reusable. As a model reaction, the reaction of benzyl azide with 4-toluenesulfonic acid cyanide forming 1-benzyl-5-(4-toluenesulfonyl)tetrazole was investigated. The formation of the tetrazole can also be carried out as a one-pot reaction without the isolation of the benzyl azide with 72% overall yield.

After the reaction, the solvent 3-sulfolene is decomposed at 135 °C and the volatile butadiene (b.p. −4.4 °C) and sulfur dioxide (b.p. −10.1 °C) are deposited in a cooling trap at −76 °C charged with excess sulfur dioxide. After the addition of hydroquinone as polymerization inhibition, 3-sulfoles is formed again quantitatively upon heating to room temperature. It appears questionable though, if 3-sulfolene with a useful liquid phase range of only 64 to a maximum of about 100 °C can be used as DMSO substitutes (easy handling, low cost, environmental compatibility) in industrial practice.

== Uses ==
Aside from its synthetic versatility (see above), sulfolene is used as an additive in electrochemical fluorination. It can increase the yield of perfluorooctanesulfonyl fluoride by about 70%. It is "highly soluble in anhydrous HF and increases the conductivity of the electrolyte solution". In this application, it undergoes a ring opening and is fluorinated to form perfluorobutanesulfonyl fluoride.
