= Ludwig Ramberg =

Swedish chemist

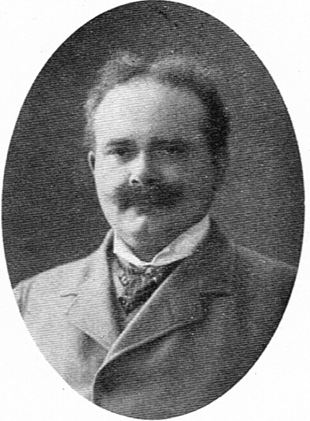
- Born: 21 February 1874; Hälsingborg, Sweden
- Died: 25 December 1940 (aged 66); Uppsala, Sweden
- Education: University of Lund
- Known for: Ramberg-Bäcklund reaction
- Scientific career
- Fields: Chemistry
- Workplaces: University of Uppsala

Ludwig Ramberg (21 February 1874 – 25 December 1940) was the Swedish chemist who discovered in 1940 the Ramberg-Bäcklund reaction, together with his student Birger Bäcklund (2 May 1908 – 21 January 1997).

== Life ==
Ramberg was born in the Swedish city of Helsingborg and studied at the University of Lund, where he received his Ph.D. in 1902. He stayed in Lund until 1918 when he became professor at the University of Uppsala. He retired in 1939 and died in Uppsala 1940.
