= Vinyl sulfone dyes =

Class of dyes

Vinylsulfon-Gruppe (R=Alkyl- oder Arylrest)

Vinyl sulfone dyes are reactive dyes comprising a vinyl sulfone group as reactive group (a fiber-bonding site of the reactive dye, "reactive hook"). Due to the relatively high reactivity of the vinyl sulfone group with water (residual moisture, air humidity), it is present in many commercial products in a protected form. For protection, an ethylsulfonyl group is substituted with a leaving group. During the dyeing process under alkaline conditions, the vinyl sulfone group is released by an elimination reaction:

Formation of the vinyl sulfone group by alkaline elimination. R= alkyl or aryl radical, X=-OSO_{3}H, -Cl

== Chemical structure ==
The vinyl sulfone reactive anchor is usually introduced into the reactive dye via an aromatic or aliphatic amine.

The oldest and most common intermediate is vinyl sulfone parabase ester (see image), an aniline substituted with a [2-(sulfooxy)ethyl]sulfonyl group. The vinyl sulfone parabase ester can be used as a diazo component in the preparation of azo dyes. A further possibility is the condensation reaction of parabase ester with a chlorine or fluorotriazine residue, which in turn can be linked to any chromophore via a further amino group.

Vinyl sulfone parabase ester (2-[(4-Aminophenyl)sulfonyl]ethyl hydrogen sulfate)

Possible variations result from further substituents on the aromatic ring - usually hydroxy, methyl or methoxy groups - or from the position of the amino relative to the vinyl sulfone group. In addition to the para-substituted compound, also meta- and orthosubstituted vinyl sulfone anilines are used.

2-[2-(2-chlorethylsulfonyl)ethoxy]ethanamine

If the vinyl sulfone group is introduced via a primary or secondary aliphatic amine, this is performed again by condensation with a halotriazine compound. An example is 2-[2-(2-chlorethylsulfonyl)ethoxy]ethanamine used in bifunctional reactive dyes in combination with a monofluoro or monochlorotriazine hook.

== Dyeing process ==
The vinylsulfone group reacts with the nucleophilic functional groups of the fibers by Michael addition to form a covalent ether bond:

Reaction of vinyl sulfone compounds with hydroxyl groups of cellulose (HO-CELL)

An unfavorable side reaction in the dyeing process is the conversion of the vinylsulfone group to the 2-(hydroxy)ethylsulfonyl group:

Reaction of vinylsulfone compounds with water/OH^{−} during dyeing

The hydroxylated, unreactive dye has to be washed out during the post-treatment.

== History ==
The first dyestuffs with a [2-(sulfooxy)ethyl]sulfonyl group were patented in 1949 by the then Farbwerke Hoechst and marketed in the following years as wool dyestuffs under the brand name Remalan or as cotton dyestuffs under the brand name Remazol. From the early 1980s onwards, reactive dyes containing a monochlorotriazine anchor in addition to the vinylsulfone reactive group were produced by the dye manufacturers Sumitomo (brand name Sumifix Supra) and Hoechst AG. In 1988, Ciba-Geigy introduced double anchor dyes with a combination of a vinylsulfone reactive group and a monofluorotriazine reactive group under the brand name Cibacron.

== Examples ==
C.I. Reactive Black 5

C.I. Reactive Red 239

C.I. Reactive Blue 19

C.I. Reactive Orange 107

C.I. Reactive Blue 235
