= Sulfonanilide =

Chemical group

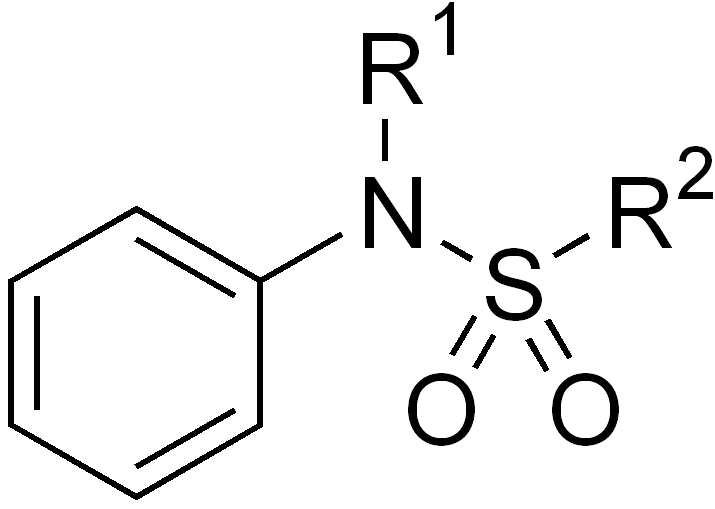
General chemical structure of a sulfanilide

In organic chemistry, a sulfonanilide group is a functional group found in certain organosulfur compounds. It possesses the chemical structure R−S(=O)_{2}−N(−C_{6}H_{5})−R', and consists of a sulfonamide group (R−S(=O)_{2}−NR'R") where one of the two nitrogen substituents (R' or R") is a phenyl group (C_{6}H_{5}). It can be viewed as a derivative of aniline (C_{6}H_{5}NH_{2}).
