= 1,2-Butadiene =

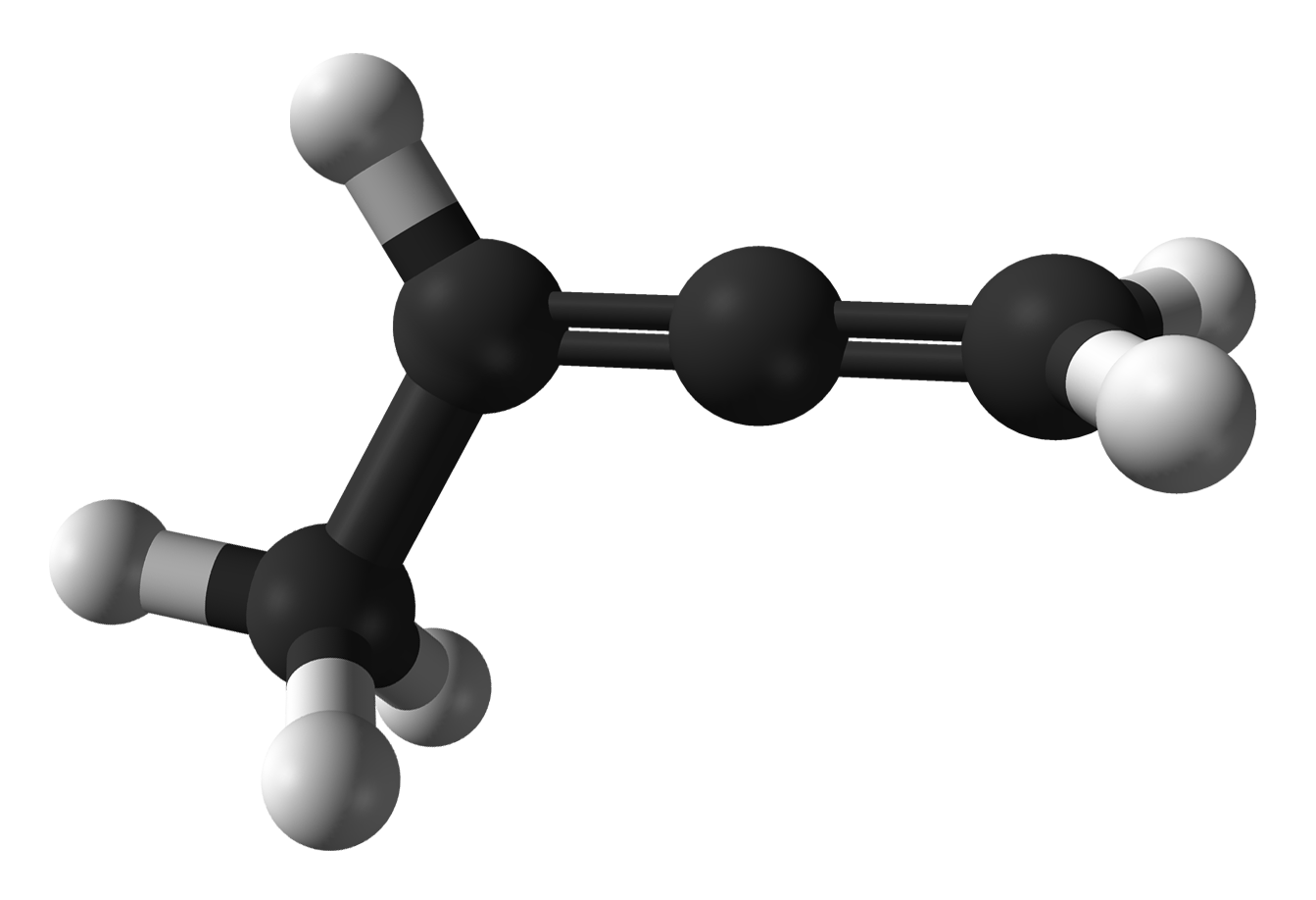

Names
- Preferred IUPAC name Buta-1,2-diene
- Other names Methyl allene

Identifiers
CAS Number	590-19-2
3D model (JSmol)	Interactive image
Beilstein Reference	1730808
ChEBI	CHEBI:39480
ChemSpider	11051
ECHA InfoCard	100.008.796
EC Number	209-674-2
Gmelin Reference	1144
PubChem CID	11535
UNII	2AZI943A8R
CompTox Dashboard (EPA)	DTXSID5027225
- InChI: InChI=1S/C4H6/c1-3-4-2/h4H,1H2,2H3 Key: QNRMTGGDHLBXQZ-UHFFFAOYSA-N
- SMILES: CC=C=C

Properties
Chemical formula	C_{4}H_{6}
Molar mass	54.092 g·mol^{−1}
Density	0.676 at 4 °C
Melting point	−136.2 °C (−213.2 °F; 137.0 K)
Boiling point	10.9 °C (51.6 °F; 284.0 K)
Refractive index (n_{D})	1.4205 at 1 °C

Thermochemistry
Enthalpy of vaporization (Δ_{f}H_{vap})	23.426 kJ/mol

Hazards
- Occupational safety and health (OHS/OSH)
Main hazards	Frostbite, flammable
- GHS labelling
Pictograms	(GHS02: Flammable) (GHS09: Environmental hazard)
Signal word	Danger
Hazard statements	H220, H224, H411
Precautionary statements	P210, P233, P240, P241, P242, P243, P273, P280, P303+P361+P353, P370+P378, P377, P381, P391, P403, P403+P235, P410+P403, P501
Flash point	−75 °C (−103 °F; 198 K)
- Except where otherwise noted, data are given for materials in their standard state (at 25 °C [77 °F], 100 kPa). Infobox references

1,2-Butadiene is the organic compound with the formula CH_{2}=C=CHCH_{3}. It is an isomer of 1,3-butadiene, which is a common monomer used to make synthetic rubber, and is often co-produced with it. It is a colorless flammable gas, one of the simplest substituted allenes.

== Production ==
The C4-fraction of petroleum obtained by cracking and separated by distillation consists of many compounds, predominantly (75%) 1,3-butadiene, isobutene, and 1-butene. 1,2‑Butadiene comprises less than 1% of this mixture. It is partially purified by extraction with N-methylpyrrolidone. 1,2-Butadiene has no commercial applications; US production was 4,500–23,000 tons in 2005.
