= Butadiene =

1,3-Butadiene
Full structural formula of 1,3-butadiene
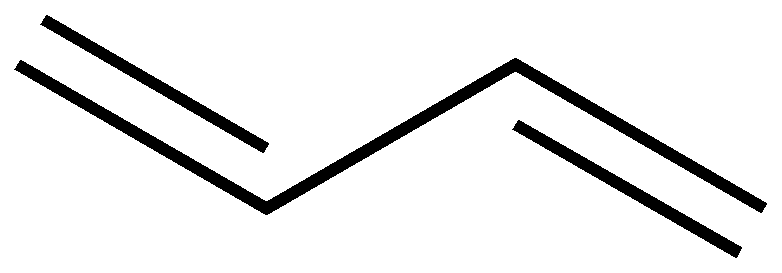
Skeletal formula of 1,3-butadiene
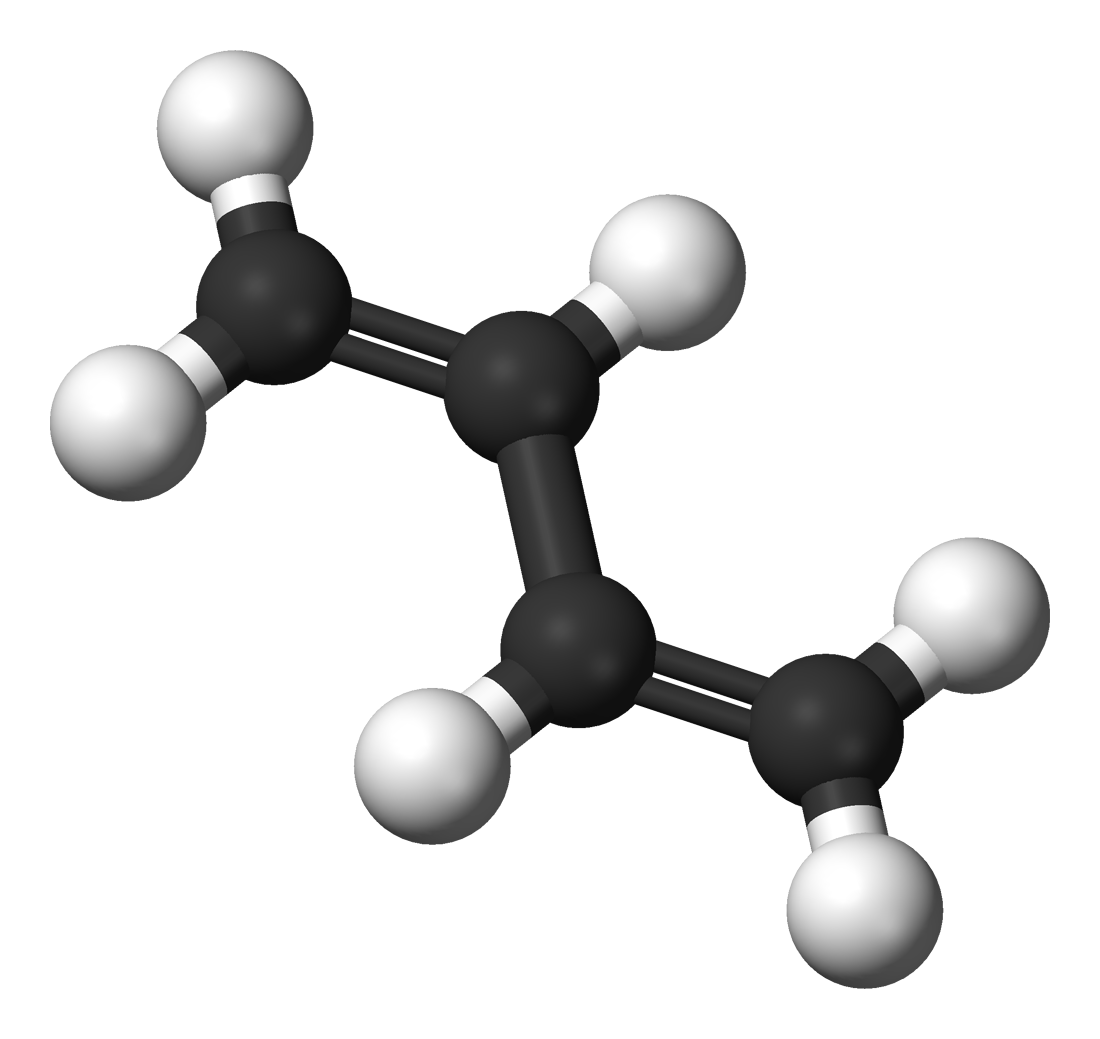
Ball-and-stick model of 1,3-butadiene
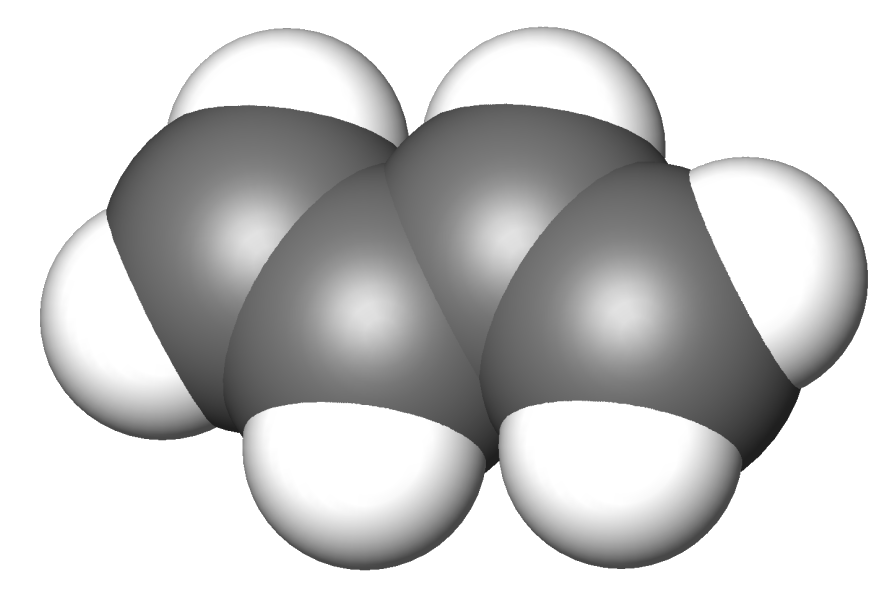
Space-filling model of 1,3-butadiene

Names
- Preferred IUPAC name Buta-1,3-diene
- Other names: Biethylene; Erythrene; Divinyl; Vinylethylene; Bivinyl; Butadiene

Identifiers
CAS Number	106-99-0
3D model (JSmol)	Interactive image
Beilstein Reference	605258
ChEBI	CHEBI:39478
ChEMBL	ChEMBL537970
ChemSpider	7557
ECHA InfoCard	100.003.138
EC Number	203-450-8
Gmelin Reference	25198
KEGG	C16450
PubChem CID	7845
RTECS number	EI9275000
UNII	JSD5FGP5VD
UN number	1010
CompTox Dashboard (EPA)	DTXSID3020203
- InChI: InChI=1S/C4H6/c1-3-4-2/h3-4H,1-2H2 Key: KAKZBPTYRLMSJV-UHFFFAOYSA-N; InChI=1/C4H6/c1-3-4-2/h3-4H,1-2H2 Key: KAKZBPTYRLMSJV-UHFFFAOYAZ
- SMILES: C=CC=C

Properties
Chemical formula	C_{4}H_{6} CH_{2}=CH−CH=CH_{2}
Molar mass	54.0916 g/mol
Appearance	Colourless gas or refrigerated liquid
Odor	Mildly aromatic or gasoline-like
Density	0.6149 g/cm^{3} at 25 °C, p>1 atm; 0.64 g/cm^{3} at −6 °C, liquid
Melting point	−108.91 °C (−164.04 °F; 164.24 K)
Boiling point	−4.41 °C (24.06 °F; 268.74 K)
Solubility in water	1.3 g/L at 5 °C, 735 mg/L at 20 °C
Solubility	Very soluble in acetone; Soluble in ether, ethanol
Vapor pressure	2.4 atm (20 °C)
Refractive index (n_{D})	1.4292
Viscosity	0.25 cP at 0 °C

Hazards
- Occupational safety and health (OHS/OSH)
Main hazards	Flammable, irritative, carcinogen
- GHS labelling
Pictograms	(GHS02: Flammable) (GHS08: Health hazard)
Signal word	Danger
Hazard statements	H220, H340, H350
Precautionary statements	P202, P210, P280, P308+P313, P377, P381, P403
NFPA 704 (fire diamond)	3 4 2
Flash point	−85 °C (−121 °F; 188 K) liquid flash point
Autoignition temperature	414 °C (777 °F; 687 K)
Explosive limits	2–12%
- Lethal dose or concentration (LD, LC)
LD_{50} (median dose)	548 mg/kg (rat, oral)
LC_{50} (median concentration)	115,111 ppm (mouse); 122,000 ppm (mouse, 2 h); 126,667 ppm (rat, 4 h); 130,000 ppm (rat, 4 h)
LC_{Lo} (lowest published)	250,000 ppm (rabbit, 30 min)
- NIOSH (US health exposure limits)
PEL (Permissible)	TWA 1 ppm ST 5 ppm
REL (Recommended)	Potential occupational carcinogen
IDLH (Immediate danger)	2000 ppm
Safety data sheet (SDS)	ECSC 0017

Related compounds
Related Alkenes and dienes	Isoprene; Chloroprene
Related compounds	Butane

Supplementary data page
- Butadiene (data page)
- Except where otherwise noted, data are given for materials in their standard state (at 25 °C [77 °F], 100 kPa). verify (what is ?) Infobox references

1,3-Butadiene (/ˌbjuːtəˈdaɪiːn/) is an organic compound with the formula CH_{2}=CH−CH=CH_{2}. It is a colorless gas that is easily condensed to a liquid. It is important industrially as a precursor to synthetic rubber. The molecule can be viewed as the union of two vinyl groups. It is the simplest conjugated diene.

Butadiene undergoes chemical degradation in the atmosphere, but it can nevertheless be found in low levels in the air of urban and suburban areas due to emission by motor vehicles.

The name butadiene can also refer to the isomer, 1,2-butadiene, which is an allene (a cumulated diene) with structure H_{2}C=C=CH−CH_{3} that has no industrial importance.

== History ==
In 1863, French chemist E. Caventou isolated butadiene from the pyrolysis of amyl alcohol. This hydrocarbon was identified as butadiene in 1886, after Henry Edward Armstrong isolated it from among the pyrolysis products of petroleum. In 1910, the Russian chemist Sergei Lebedev polymerized butadiene and obtained a material with rubber-like properties. This polymer was, however, found to be too soft to replace natural rubber in many applications, notably automobile tires.

The butadiene industry originated in the years before World War II. Many of the belligerent nations realized that in the event of war, they could be cut off from rubber plantations controlled by the British Empire, and sought to reduce their dependence on natural rubber. In 1929, Eduard Tschunker and Walter Bock, working for IG Farben in Germany, made a copolymer of styrene and butadiene that could be used in automobile tires. Worldwide production quickly ensued, with butadiene being produced from grain alcohol in the Soviet Union and the United States, and from coal-derived acetylene in Germany.

== Production ==
In 2020, 14.2 million tons were estimated to have been produced.

=== Extraction from C_{4} hydrocarbons ===
In the United States, western Europe, and Japan, butadiene is produced as a byproduct of the steam cracking process used to produce ethylene and other alkenes. When mixed with steam and briefly heated to very high temperatures (often over 900 °C), aliphatic hydrocarbons give up hydrogen to produce a complex mixture of unsaturated hydrocarbons, including butadiene. The quantity of butadiene produced depends on the hydrocarbons used as feed. Light feeds, such as ethane, give primarily ethylene when cracked, but heavier feeds favor the formation of heavier olefins, butadiene, and aromatic hydrocarbons.

Butadiene is typically isolated from the other four-carbon hydrocarbons produced in steam cracking by extractive distillation using a polar aprotic solvent such as acetonitrile, N-methyl-2-pyrrolidone, furfural, or dimethylformamide, from which it is then stripped by distillation.

=== From dehydrogenation of n-butane ===
Butadiene can also be produced by the catalytic dehydrogenation of normal butane (n-butane). The first such post-war commercial plant, producing 65,000 tons per year of butadiene, began operations in 1957 in Houston, Texas. Prior to that, in the 1940s the Rubber Reserve Company, a part of the United States government, constructed several plants in Borger, Texas, Toledo, Ohio, and El Segundo, California, to produce synthetic rubber for the war effort as part of the United States Synthetic Rubber Program. Total capacity was 68 KMTA (Kilo Metric Tons per Annum).

Today, butadiene from n-butane is commercially produced using the Houdry Catadiene process, which was developed during World War II. This entails treating butane over alumina and chromia at high temperatures.

=== From ethanol ===
In other parts of the world, including South America, Eastern Europe, China, and India, butadiene is also produced from ethanol. While not competitive with steam cracking for producing large volumes of butadiene, lower capital costs make production from ethanol a viable option for smaller-capacity plants. Two processes were in use.

In the single-step process developed by Sergey Lebedev, ethanol is converted to butadiene, hydrogen, and water at 400–450 °C over any of a variety of metal oxide catalysts:

2 CH_{3}CH_{2}OH → CH_{2}=CH−CH=CH_{2} + 2 H_{2}O + H_{2}

This process was the basis for the Soviet Union's synthetic rubber industry during and after World War II, and it remained in limited use in Russia and other parts of eastern Europe until the end of the 1970s. At the same time this type of manufacture was canceled in Brazil. As of 2017, no butadiene was produced industrially from ethanol.

In the other, two-step process, developed by the Russian emigre chemist Ivan Ostromislensky, ethanol is oxidized to acetaldehyde, which reacts with additional ethanol over a tantalum-promoted porous silica catalyst at 325–350 °C to yield butadiene:

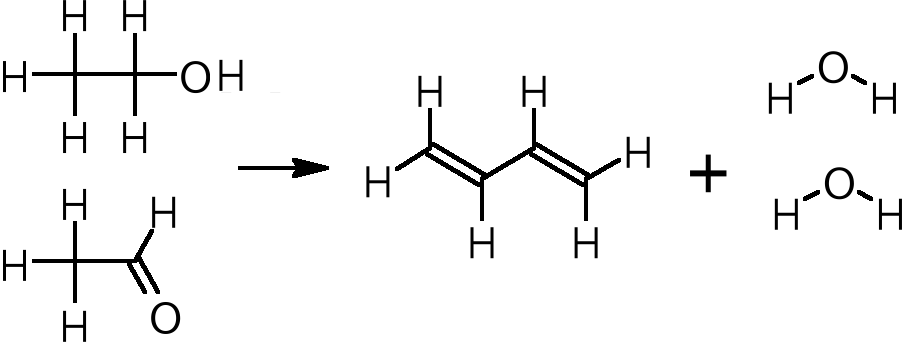
CH_{3}CH_{2}OH + CH_{3}CHO → CH_{2}=CH−CH=CH_{2} + 2 H_{2}O

This process was one of the three used in the United States to produce "government rubber" during World War II, although it is less economical than the butane or butene routes for the large volumes. Still, three plants with a total capacity of 200,000 tons per year were constructed in the U.S. (Institute, West Virginia, Louisville, Kentucky, and Kobuta, Pennsylvania) with start-ups completed in 1943, the Louisville plant initially created butadiene from acetylene generated by an associated calcium carbide plant. The process remains in use today in China and India.

=== From butenes ===
1,3-Butadiene can also be produced by catalytic dehydrogenation of normal butenes. This method was also used by the U.S. Synthetic Rubber Program (USSRP) during World War II. The process was much more economical than the alcohol or n-butane route but competed with aviation gasoline for available butene molecules (butenes were plentiful thanks to catalytic cracking). The USSRP constructed several plants in Baton Rouge and Lake Charles, Louisiana; Houston, Baytown, and Port Neches, Texas; and Torrance, California. Total annual production was 275 KMTA.

In the 1960s, a Houston company known as "Petro-Tex" patented a process to produce butadiene from normal butenes by oxidative dehydrogenation using a proprietary catalyst. It is unclear if this technology is practiced commercially.

After World War II, the production from butenes became the major type of production in USSR.

=== For laboratory use ===
1,3-Butadiene is inconvenient for laboratory use because it is gas. Laboratory procedures have been optimized for its generation from nongaseous precursors. It can be produced by the retro-Diels-Alder reaction of cyclohexene. Sulfolene is a convenient solid storable source for 1,3-butadiene in the laboratory. It releases the diene and sulfur dioxide upon heating.

== Uses ==
Most butadiene (75% of the manufactured 1,3-butadiene) is used to make synthetic rubbers for the manufacture of tires and components of many consumer items.

The conversion of butadiene to synthetic rubbers is called polymerization, a process by which small molecules (monomers) are linked to make large ones (polymers). The mere polymerization of butadiene gives polybutadiene, which is a very soft, almost liquid material. The polymerization of butadiene and other monomers gives copolymers, which are more valued. The polymerization of butadiene and styrene and/or acrylonitrile, such as acrylonitrile butadiene styrene (ABS), nitrile-butadiene (NBR), styrene-butadiene (SBR) and polybutadiene acrylonitrile (PBAN). These copolymers are tough and/or elastic depending on the ratio of the monomers used in their preparation. SBR is the material most commonly used for the production of automobile tires. Precursors to still other synthetic rubbers are prepared from butadiene. One is chloroprene.

Butadiene-based polymers, particularly polybutadiene acrylonitrile (PBAN) and hydroxyl-terminated polybutadiene (HTPB) are used as binders for ammonium perchlorate composite propellant (APCP) solid rocket motors. Large American solid rocket motors such as those used on Titan III, Space Shuttle and Space Launch System have used PBAN, while some other nations (such as Japan in M-5 rocket and India in PSLV) use HTPB. Amateur rocketeers often use HTPB for its reduced curing temperature and fumes, despite much higher cost.

Smaller amounts of butadiene are used to make adiponitrile, a precursor to some nylons. The conversion of butadiene to adiponitrile entails the addition of hydrogen cyanide to each of the double bonds in butadiene. The process is called hydrocyanation.

Butadiene is used to make the solvent sulfolane.

Butadiene is also useful in the synthesis of cycloalkanes and cycloalkenes, as it reacts with double and triple carbon-carbon bonds through Diels-Alder reactions. The most widely used such reactions involve reactions of butadiene with one or two other molecules of butadiene, i.e., dimerization and trimerization respectively. Via dimerization butadiene is converted to 4-vinylcyclohexene and cyclooctadiene. In fact, vinylcyclohexene is a common impurity that accumulates when butadiene is stored. Via trimerization, butadiene is converted to cyclododecatriene. Some of these processes employ nickel- or titanium-containing catalysts.

Butadiene is also a precursor to 1-octene via palladium-catalyzed telomerization with methanol. This reaction produces 1-methoxy-2,7-octadiene as an intermediate.

== Structure, conformation, and stability ==
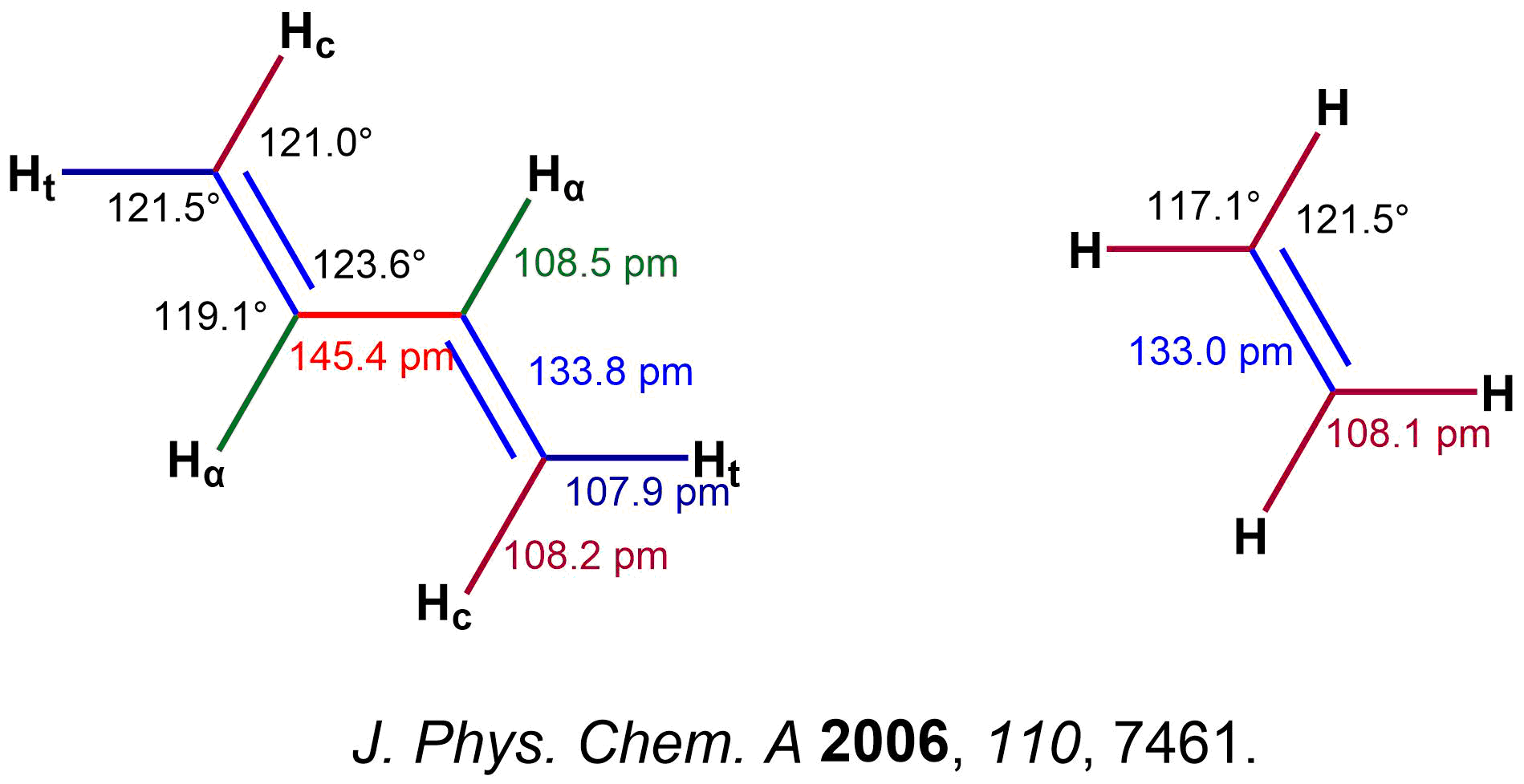
Comparison of butadiene (s-trans conformer) and ethylene

The most stable conformer of 1,3-butadiene is the s-trans conformation, in which the molecule is planar, with the two pairs of double bonds facing opposite directions. This conformation is most stable because orbital overlap between double bonds is maximized, allowing for maximum conjugation, while steric effects are minimized. Conventionally, the s-trans conformation is considered to have a C_{2}-C_{3} dihedral angle of 180°. In contrast, the s-cis conformation, in which the dihedral angle is 0°, with the pair of double bonds facing the same direction is approximately 16.5 kJ/mol (3.9 kcal/mol) higher in energy, due to steric hindrance. This geometry is a local energy maximum, so in contrast to the s-trans geometry, it is not a conformer. The gauche geometry, in which the double bonds of the s-cis geometry are twisted to give a dihedral angle of around 38°, is a second conformer that is around 12.0 kJ/mol (2.9 kcal/mol) higher in energy than the s-trans conformer. Overall, there is a barrier of 24.8 kJ/mol (5.9 kcal/mol) for isomerization between the two conformers. This increased rotational barrier and strong overall preference for a near-planar geometry is evidence for a delocalized π system and a small degree of partial double bond character in the C–C single bond, in accord with resonance theory.

Despite the high energy of the s-cis conformation, 1,3-butadiene needs to assume this conformation (or one very similar) before it can participate as the four-electron component in concerted cycloaddition reactions like the Diels-Alder reaction.

Similarly, a combined experimental and computational study has found that the double bond of s-trans-butadiene has a length of 133.8 pm, while that for ethylene has a length of 133.0 pm. This was taken as evidence of a π-bond weakened and lengthened by delocalization, as depicted by the resonance structures shown below.

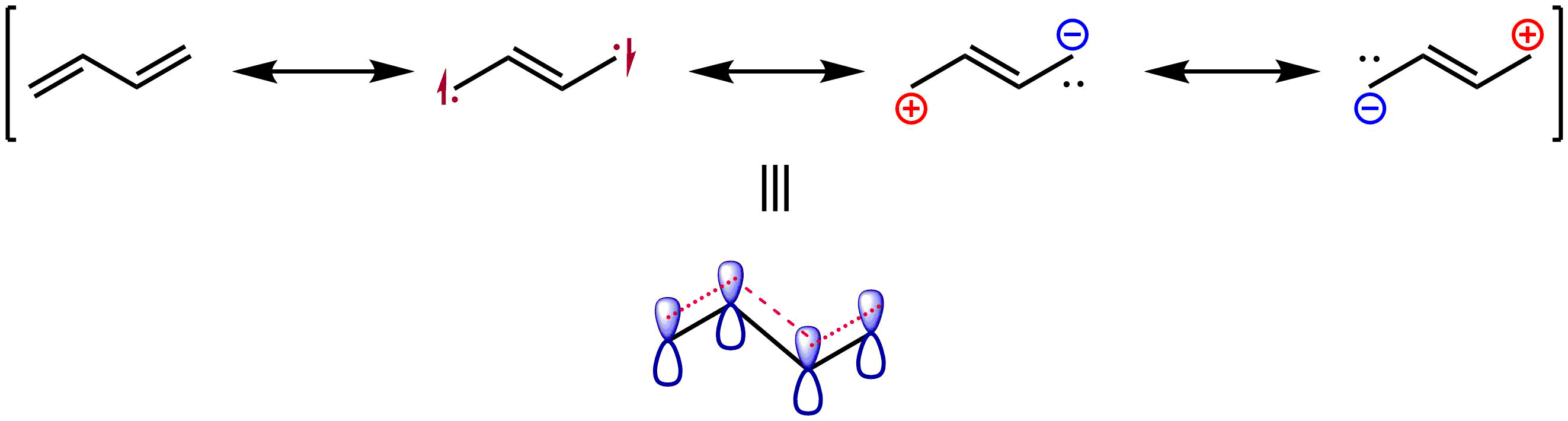

A qualitative picture of the molecular orbitals of 1,3-butadiene is readily obtained by applying Hückel theory. (The article on Hückel theory gives a derivation for the butadiene orbitals.)

1,3-Butadiene is also thermodynamically stabilized. While a monosubstituted double bond releases about 30.3 kcal/mol of heat upon hydrogenation, 1,3-butadiene releases slightly less (57.1 kcal/mol) than twice this energy (60.6 kcal/mol), expected for two isolated double bonds. That implies a stabilization energy of 3.5 kcal/mol. Similarly, the hydrogenation of the terminal double bond of 1,4-pentadiene releases 30.1 kcal/mol of heat, while hydrogenation of the terminal double bond of conjugated (E)-1,3-pentadiene releases only 26.5 kcal/mol, implying a very similar value of 3.6 kcal/mol for the stabilization energy. The ~3.5 kcal/mol difference in these heats of hydrogenation can be taken to be the resonance energy of a conjugated diene.

== Reactions ==
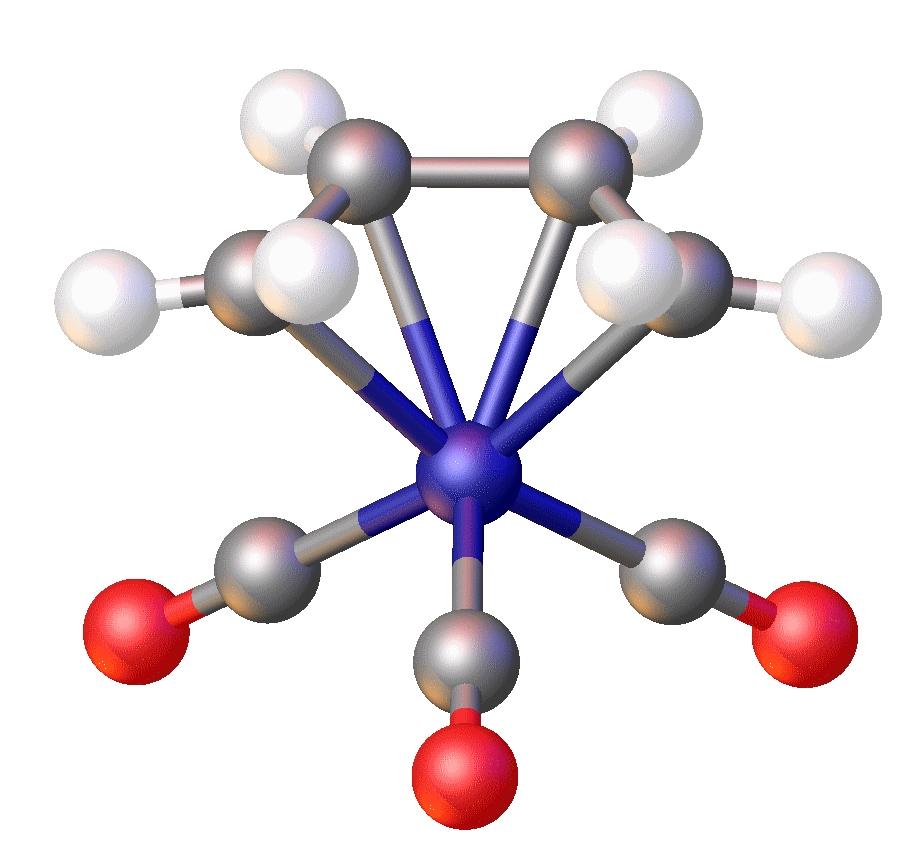
The structure of (butadiene)iron tricarbonyl

The industrial uses illustrate the tendency of butadiene to polymerize. Its susceptibility to 1,4-addition reactions is illustrated by its hydrocyanation. Like many dienes, it undergoes Pd-catalyzed reactions that proceed via allyl complexes. It is a partner in Diels–Alder reactions, e.g. with maleic anhydride to give tetrahydrophthalic anhydride.

Like other dienes, butadiene is a ligand for low-valent metal complexes, e.g. the derivatives Fe(butadiene)(CO)_{3} and Mo(butadiene)_{3}.

== Environmental health and safety ==
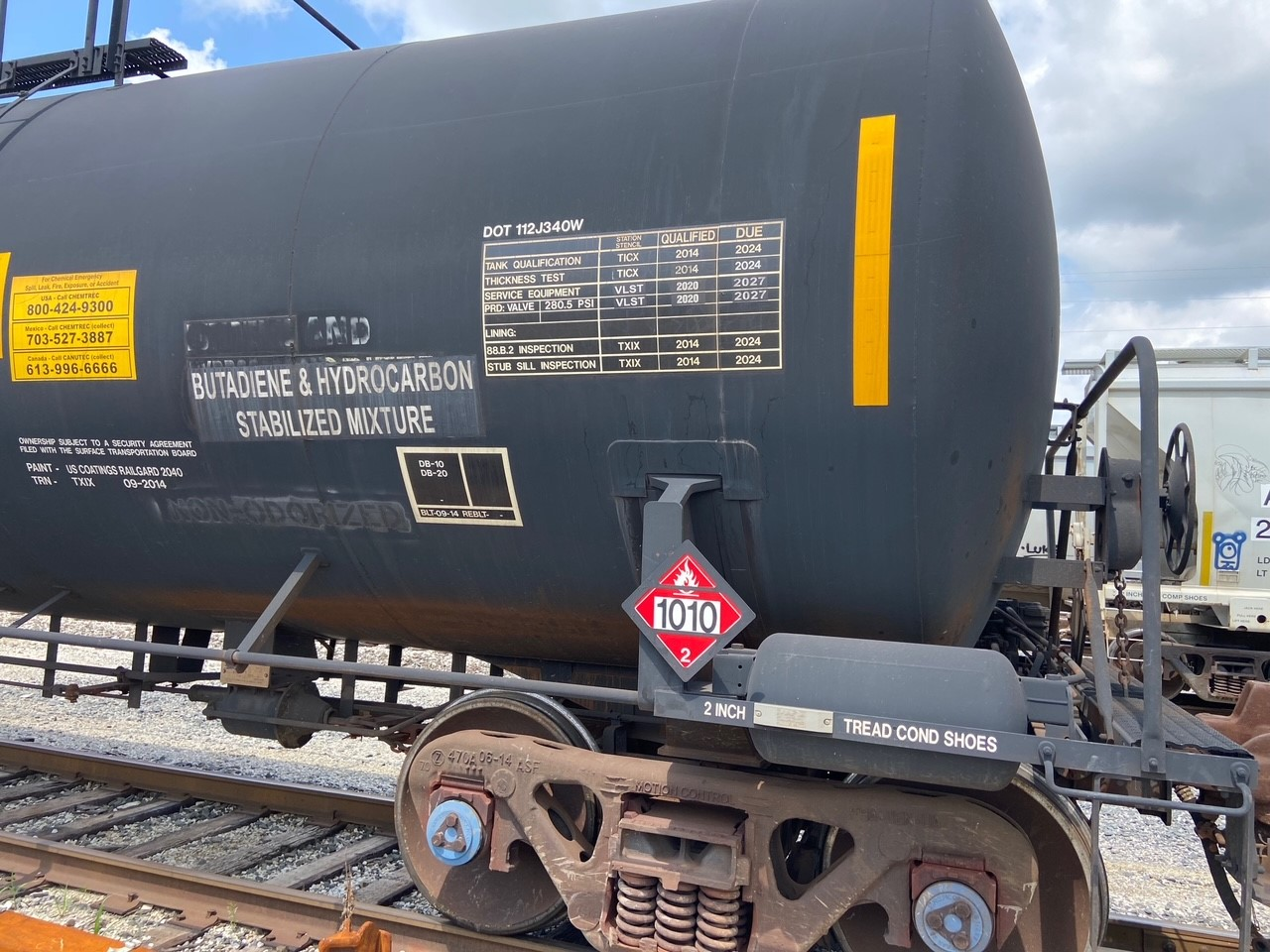
A railway tank car carrying a butadiene and hydrocarbon mixture, displaying hazardous materials information including a diamond-shaped U.S. DOT placard showing a UN number

Butadiene is of low acute toxicity. LC50 is 12.5–11.5 vol% for inhalation by rats and mice.

Long-term exposure has been associated with cardiovascular disease. There is a consistent association with leukemia, as well as a significant association with other cancers.

IARC has designated 1,3-butadiene as a Group 1 carcinogen ('carcinogenic to humans'), and the Agency for Toxic Substances Disease Registry and the US EPA also list the chemical as a carcinogen. The American Conference of Governmental Industrial Hygienists (ACGIH) lists the chemical as a suspected carcinogen. The Natural Resources Defense Council (NRDC) lists some disease clusters that are suspected to be associated with this chemical. Some researchers have concluded it is the most potent carcinogen in cigarette smoke, twice as potent as the runner up acrylonitrile.

1,3-Butadiene is also a suspected human teratogen. Prolonged and excessive exposure can affect many areas in the human body; blood, brain, eye, heart, kidney, lung, nose and throat have all been shown to react to the presence of excessive 1,3-butadiene. Animal data suggest that women have a higher sensitivity to possible carcinogenic effects of butadiene over men when exposed to the chemical. This may be due to estrogen receptor impacts. While these data reveal important implications to the risks of human exposure to butadiene, more data are necessary to draw conclusive risk assessments. There is also a lack of human data for the effects of butadiene on reproductive and development shown to occur in mice, but animal studies have shown breathing butadiene during pregnancy can increase the number of birth defects, and humans have the same hormone systems as animals.

1,3-Butadiene is recognized as a highly reactive volatile organic compound (HRVOC) for its potential to readily form ozone, and as such, emissions of the chemical are highly regulated by TCEQ in parts of the Houston-Brazoria-Galveston Ozone Non-Attainment Area.

== Data sheet ==
Properties
Phase behavior
Triple point	164.2 K (−109.0 °C) ? bar
Critical point	425 K (152 °C) 43.2 bar
Structure
Symmetry group	C_{2h}
Gas properties
Δ_{f}H^{0}	110.2 kJ/mol
C_{p}	79.5 J/mol·K
Liquid properties
Δ_{f}H^{0}	90.5 kJ/mol
S^{0}	199.0 J/mol·K
C_{p}	123.6 J/mol·K
Liquid density	0.64 ×10^{3} kg/m^{3}

== See also ==
- Cyclobutadiene
- Polybutadiene
- Hydroxyl-terminated polybutadiene
