= Methylsulfonylmethane =

Dimethyl sulfone
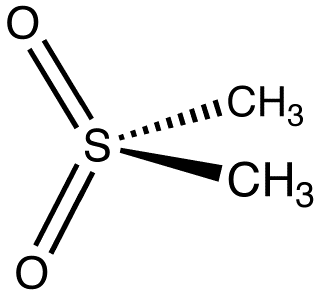
- Methylsulfonylmethane

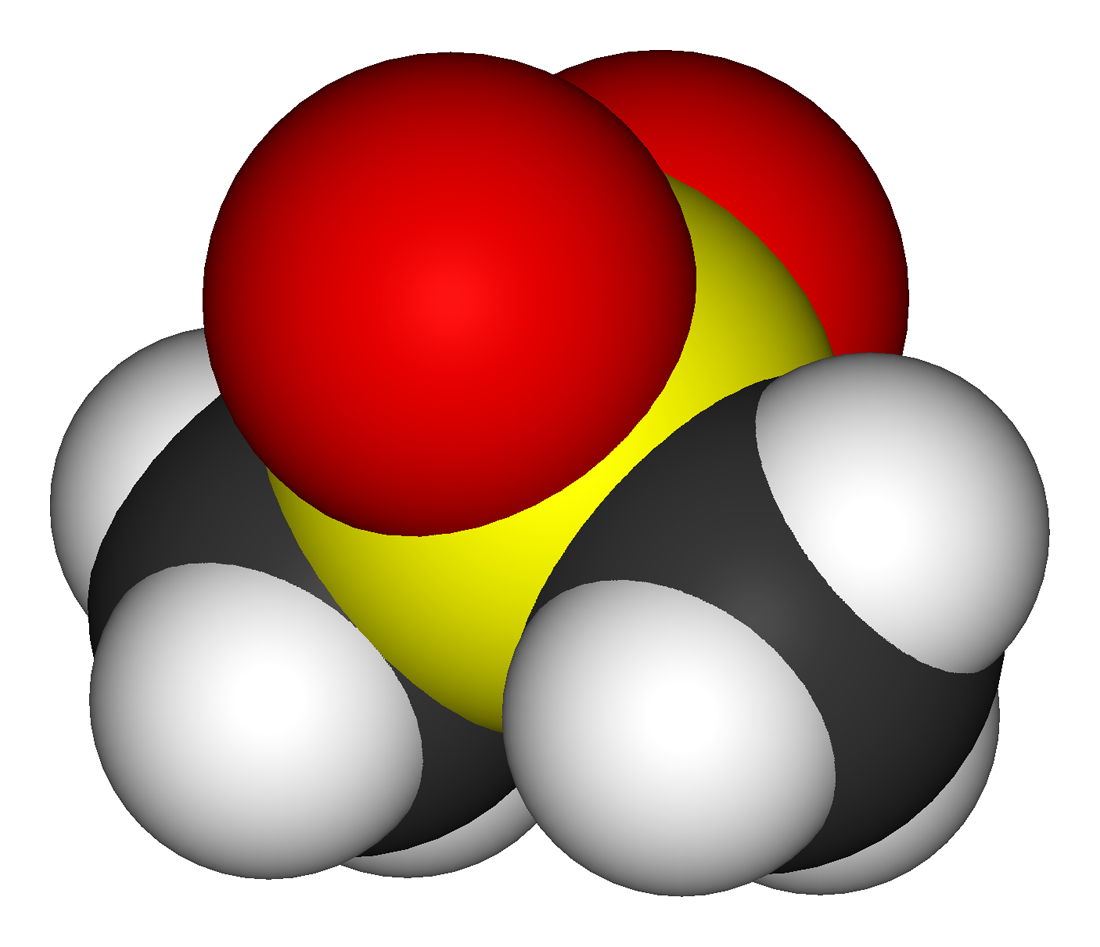
- Dimethylsulfone

Names
- Preferred IUPAC name (Methanesulfonyl)methane
- Other names: Methane, 1,1'-sulfonylbis-dimethyl sulfone; Methyl sulfone; Sulfonylbismethane; DMSO_{2}

Identifiers
CAS Number	67-71-0
3D model (JSmol)	Interactive image
Abbreviations	MSM; DMSO_{2} Me_{2}SO_{2}
Beilstein Reference	1737717
ChEBI	CHEBI:9349
ChEMBL	ChEMBL25028
ChemSpider	5978
ECHA InfoCard	100.000.605
EC Number	200-665-9
Gmelin Reference	130437
KEGG	C11142
PubChem CID	6213
RTECS number	PB2785000
UNII	9H4PO4Z4FT
CompTox Dashboard (EPA)	DTXSID4043937
- InChI: InChI=1S/C2H6O2S/c1-5(2,3)4/h1-2H3 Key: HHVIBTZHLRERCL-UHFFFAOYSA-N; InChI=1/C2H6O2S/c1-5(2,3)4/h1-2H3 Key: HHVIBTZHLRERCL-UHFFFAOYAG
- SMILES: [O-][S++]([O-])(C)C

Properties
Chemical formula	C_{2}H_{6}O_{2}S
Molar mass	94.13 g·mol^{−1}
Appearance	White crystalline solid
Density	1.45 g/cm^{3}
Melting point	107–109 °C (225–228 °F; 380–382 K)
Boiling point	248 °C (478 °F; 521 K)
Solubility in water	187 g/L (30 °C (86 °F; 303 K))
log P	-1.41 (water / octanol)
Acidity (pK_{a})	31

Hazards
NFPA 704 (fire diamond)	2 1 0
Flash point	143 °C (289 °F; 416 K)
- Lethal dose or concentration (LD, LC)
LD_{50} (median dose)	5g/kg (oral, rat)

Related compounds
Related compounds	DMSO; Dimethyl sulfide; Dimethyl sulfate; Sulfolane
- Except where otherwise noted, data are given for materials in their standard state (at 25 °C [77 °F], 100 kPa). verify (what is ?) Infobox references

Dimethyl sulfone (DMSO_{2}) is an organosulfur compound with the formula (CH_{3})_{2}SO_{2}. It is also known by several other names including methyl sulfone and (especially in alternative medicine) methylsulfonylmethane (MSM). This colorless solid features the sulfonyl functional group and is the simplest of the sulfones. It is relatively inert chemically and is able to resist decomposition at elevated temperatures. It occurs naturally in some primitive plants, is present in small amounts in many foods and beverages, and is marketed (under the MSM name) as a dietary supplement. It is sometimes used as a cutting agent for illicitly manufactured methamphetamine. It is also commonly found in the atmosphere above marine areas, where it is used as a carbon source by the airborne bacteria Afipia. Oxidation of dimethyl sulfoxide produces the sulfone, both under laboratory conditions and metabolically.

== Use as a solvent ==
Because of its polarity and thermal stability, molten DMSO_{2} has been used industrially as a high-temperature solvent. For example, displacement of aryl chlorides by potassium fluoride has been conducted in the liquid.

With a pK_{a} of 31, the sulfone can be deprotonated with sodium amide. The conjugate base has been used as a nucleophile.

== Medical and dietary use ==
Methylsulfonylmethane is marketed as a dietary supplement with medical claims ranging from anti-inflammatory effects for pain management, skin condition and aging treatments, and immune system modulation. No medical uses for MSM have been approved and there is limited evidence to support most of the claims. Small studies of MSM have suggested some benefit for treatment of oxidative stress and osteoarthritis, but evidence for other uses is lacking.

=== Osteoarthritis ===
Methylsulfonylmethane may or may not be useful for osteoarthritis (OA) knee pain relief. Methodological issues with the clinical trials prevent firm conclusions, and the review authors stated: "No definitive conclusion can currently be drawn" and there is "no definitive evidence that MSM is superior to placebo in the treatment of mild to moderate osteoarthritis of the knee."

== Contraindications and safety ==
In July 2007 a manufacturer of MSM submitted a notification to the U.S. FDA claiming generally recognized as safe (GRAS) status. GRAS status is for safety, and has no evaluation of efficacy. The FDA responded in February 2008 with a letter of non-objection, functionally designating OptiMSM, the branded form of MSM, as GRAS. The designation allows MSM to be added to processed foods.

The LD_{50} of MSM is greater than 17.5 grams per kilogram of body weight. Extensive research in animal models indicates MSM has a very low toxicity when administered both orally and topically. MSM is considered 'Possibly Safe' at therapeutic doses.

== Pharmacology ==
=== Pharmacology and toxicity ===
Nuclear magnetic resonance (NMR) studies have demonstrated that oral doses of MSM are absorbed into the blood and cross the blood/brain barrier. An NMR study has also found detectable levels of MSM normally present in the blood and cerebrospinal fluid, suggesting that it derives from dietary sources, intestinal bacterial metabolism, and the body's endogenous methanethiol metabolism.

=== Mechanism of action ===
The mechanism of action underlying MSM's medical claims is not clear. Some promoters suggest that most people do not consume enough sulfur. There is no Dietary Reference Intake (DRI) or Daily Value established for sulfur, but it is present in significant amounts in foods such as cruciferous vegetables, garlic, onions, asafoetida, legumes, nuts, seeds, plant milk, animal milk and eggs (both whites and yolks). The claims for the need for sulfur supplementation originate with Robert Herschler, a biochemist who filed a patent for using MSM as a dietary supplement in 1982.

Moreover, in cases involving topical therapeutics, the role of MSM as an active agent, per se, versus its having a role in promoting skin permeation (in manner, akin to its solvent relative DMSO) must be characterized/controlled.

The biochemical effects of supplemental methylsulfonylmethane are poorly understood. Some researchers have suggested that MSM has anti-inflammatory effects.

The spectrum of biological effects of dimethyl sulfoxide (DMSO) and MSM differ, but those of DMSO may be mediated, at least in part, by MSM.

== Research ==
=== Skin, hair, nails ===
The first scientific investigation of MSM for skin health was published in 2015. The RCT used a 3 g per day dose and included only 20 women. Results showed significant improvements in the number and severity of facial wrinkles, firmness, tone and texture. Another study evaluated doses of 1 g and 3 g and showed improvements in wrinkles, firmness, and hydration at both dose levels in 20 persons. The same author published a study on MSM for hair and nails from the same clinical trial. The results showed improvements in hair shine, volume, and appearance, and nail shine and appearance. An Italian study evaluated the effects of a nutraceutical composed of MSM, hyaluronic acid, and L-carnosine. The results from RCT showed broad improvements in facial skin hydration and elasticity, as well as decreased sebaceous secretions.

=== Oxidative stress and inflammatory response ===
In one small human trial, MSM has been shown to protect muscles from damage by reducing the amount of oxidative stress damage incurred through exercise. In a second small trial the total antioxidant capacity was significantly increased after taking MSM. Studies in animals indicate a hepatoprotective effect of MSM against several toxins including acetaminophen, paraquat, and carbon tetrachloride. Animal models of experimental colitis and pulmonary hypertension indicate a protective effect as well.

=== Allergies and immunity ===
Two studies have evaluated the effects of MSM on allergic rhinitis. A 2004 multi-centered, open-label clinical trial found that MSM reduced both upper and lower respiratory symptoms associated with seasonal allergic rhinitis (SAR), and increased energy levels. It found no significant changes in IgE levels, although the duration of the study was not likely long enough to see changes. An RCT evaluated three doses of MSM and found that a 3 g daily dose was most effective compared to 1 g or 6 g per day. Daily use at 3 g decreased allergy-associated symptoms, including itchy eyes, itchy nose, watery eyes, rhinorrhea, sneezing, and nasal obstruction. The 3 g dose also improved peak nasal inspiratory flow (PNIF) indicating improved breathing. The study also evaluated an acute 12 g dose and found significant improvements in all symptoms except itching eyes and sneezing, but not for PNIF.

MSM has been shown to improve immune function markers. RCT found that in blood samples taken after bouts of exhaustive exercise, there was a reduced response to an infectious stimulus in the placebo group, but the MSM group maintained a robust response, indicating that MSM protected against stress-induced immunosuppression. The authors postulate that MSM's anti-inflammatory properties reduce the overstimulation of inflammatory cells during exercise, thus conserving their ability to respond to infections threats. This is supported by in vitro research showing MSM inhibits over-activation of white blood cells and has an anti-apoptotic effect.

=== Toxicity ===
A study on high incidence male (HIM) mutants of the nematode C. elegans found that MSM decreased lifespan and decreased fertility in a dose-dependent manner.
