= Carbonyl allylation =

Chemical reaction

In organic chemistry, carbonyl allylation describes methods for adding an allyl anion to an aldehyde or ketone to produce a homoallylic alcohol. The carbonyl allylation was first reported in 1876 by Alexander Zaitsev and employed an allylzinc reagent.

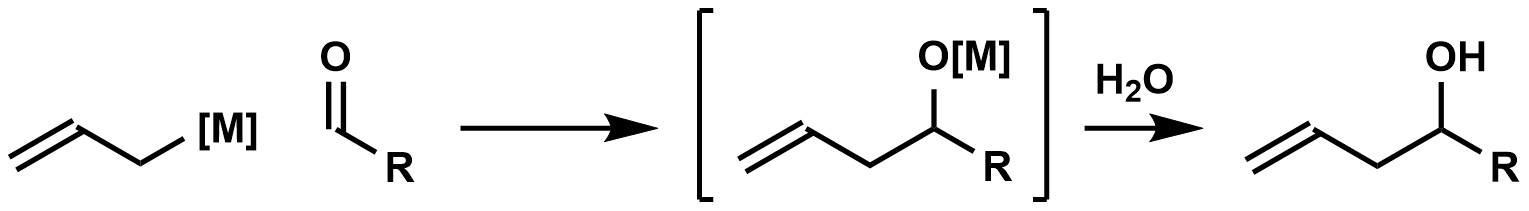
insert a caption here

== Enantioselective versions ==
In 1978, Hoffmann reported the first asymmetric carbonyl allylation using a chiral allylmetal reagent, an allylborane derived from camphor. Such methods utilize preformed allyl metal reagents. The approach is well developed using allyl boranes

(13)

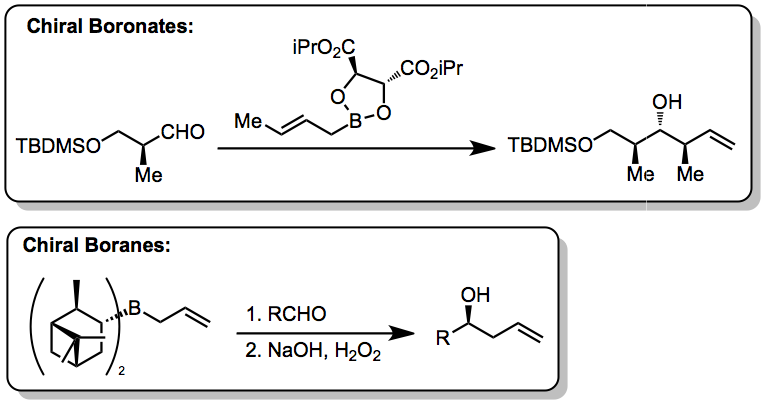

As illustrated by the Keck allylation, catalytic enantioselective additions of achiral allylmetal reagents to carbonyl compounds also are possible by organostannane additions.

Allylic boronate and -borane reagents have also been developed for enantioselective addition to carbonyls—in this class of reactions, the allylic boron reagent confers stereochemical control

(13)

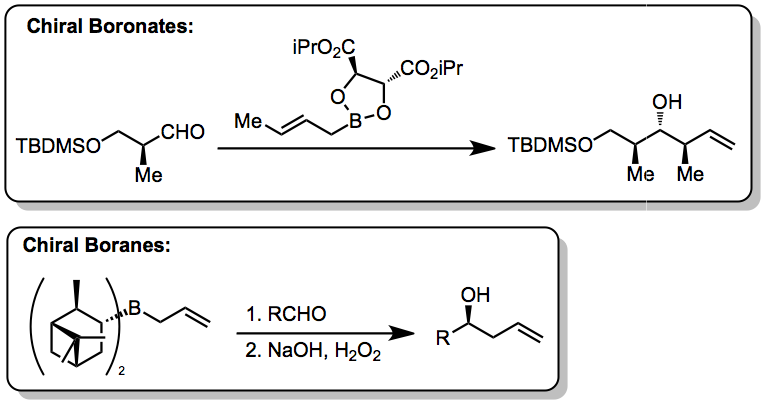

=== Catalysis ===
In 1991, Yamamoto disclosed the first catalytic enantioselective method for carbonyl allylation, which employed a chiral boron Lewis acid-catalyst in combination with allyltrimethylsilane. Numerous other catalytic enantioselective methods for carbonyl allylation followed. Catalytic variants of the Nozaki-Hiyama-Kishi reaction represent an alternative method for asymmetric carbonyl allylation, but stoichiometric metallic reductants are required.

Whereas the aforementioned asymmetric carbonyl allylations rely on preformed allylmetal reagents, the Krische allylation exploits allyl acetate for enantioselective carbonyl allylation. Selected methods for asymmetric carbonyl allylation are summarized below.

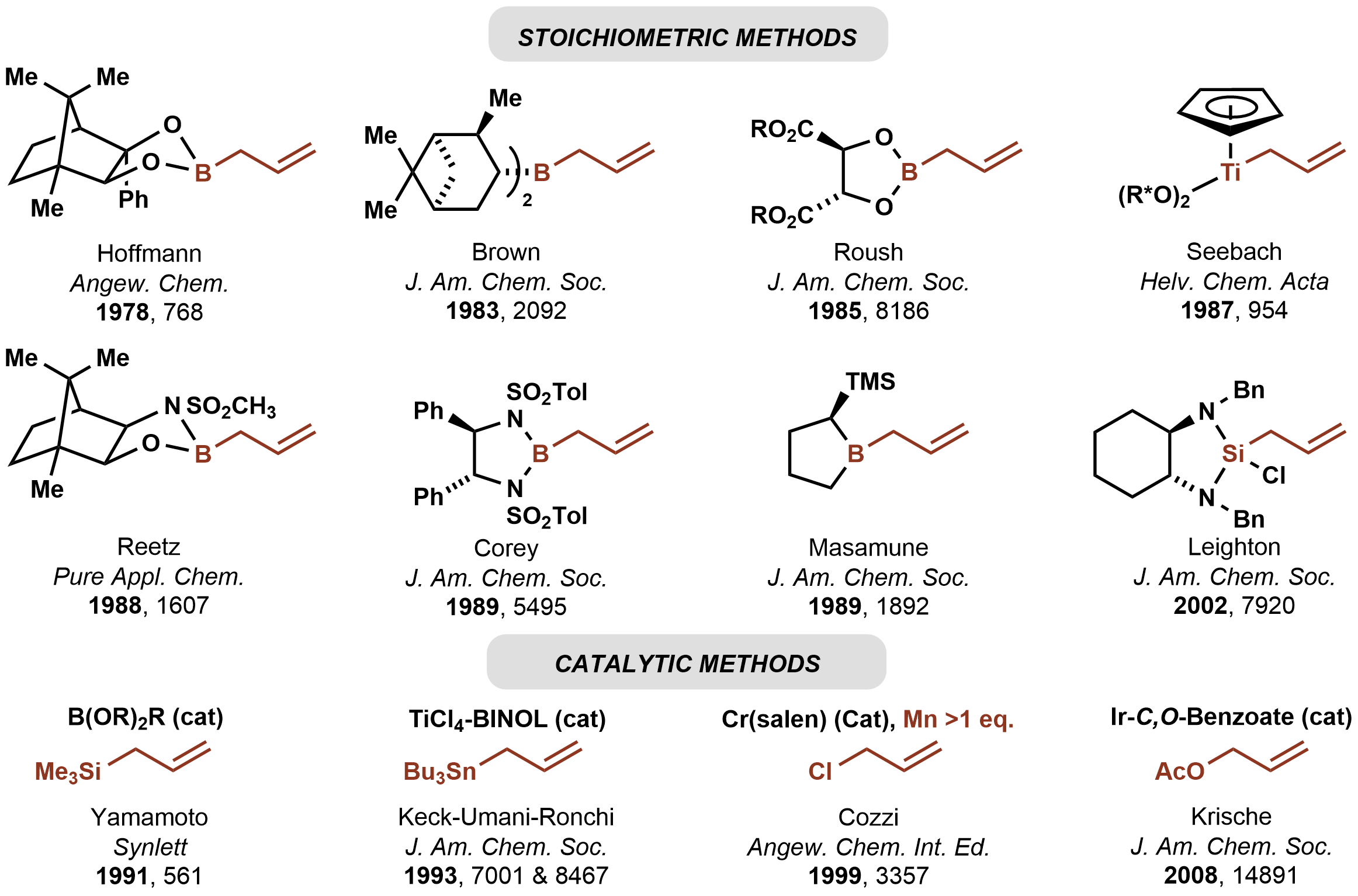
insert a caption here

== Use in total synthesis ==
Carbonyl allylation has been employed in the synthesis of polyketide natural products and other oxygenated molecules with a contiguous array of stereocenters. For example, allylstannanation of a threose-derived aldehyde affords the macrolide antascomicin B, which structurally resembles FK506 and rapamycin, and is a potent binder of FKBP12. The Krische allylation was used to prepare the polyketide (+)-SCH 351448, a macrodiolide ionophore bearing 14 stereogenic centers.

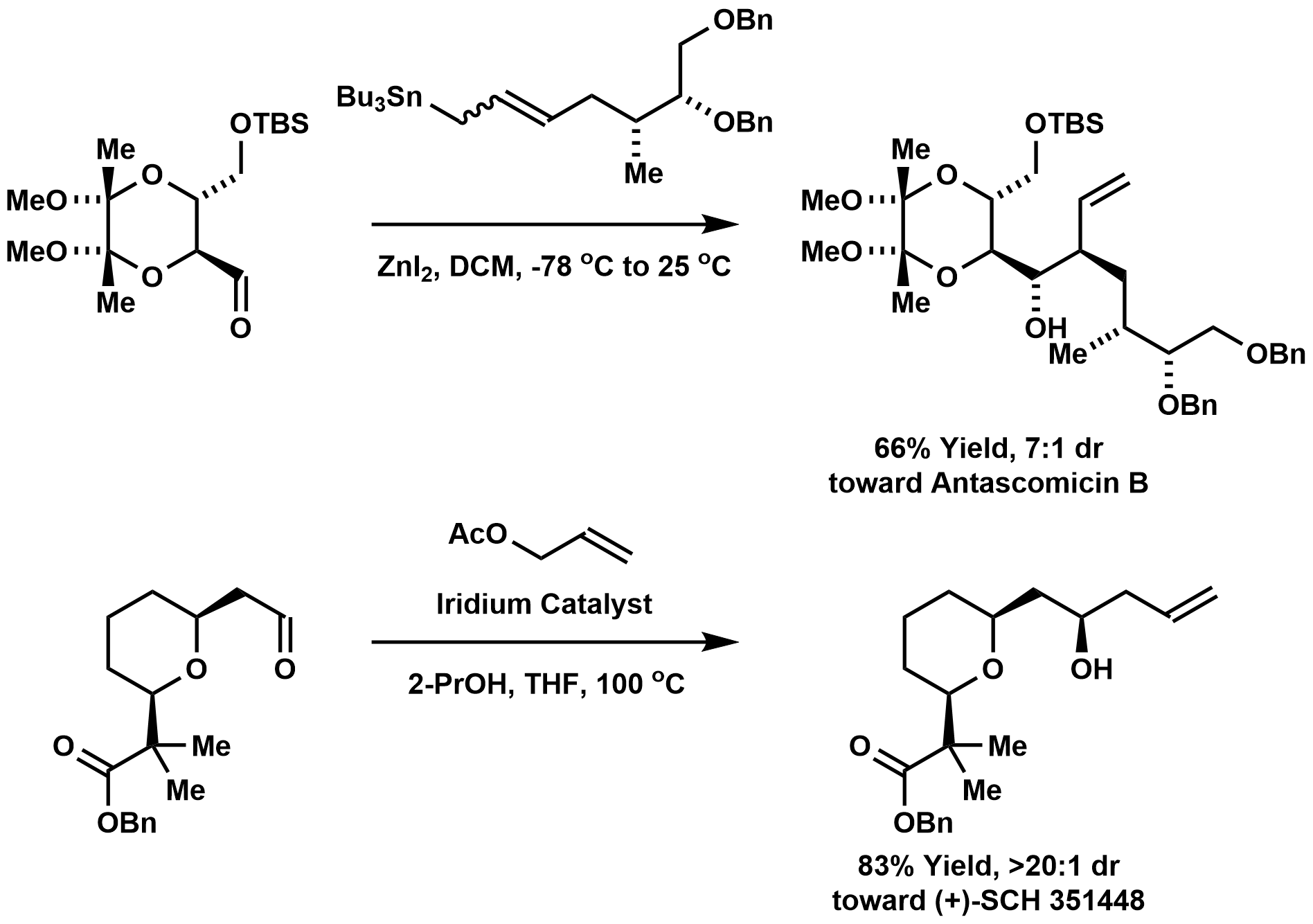
insert a caption here

== Older primary literature ==
- Brown, Herbert C.; Jadhav, Prabhakar K. (April 1983). "Asymmetric carbon-carbon bond formation via .beta.-allyldiisopinocampheylborane. Simple synthesis of secondary homoallylic alcohols with excellent enantiomeric purities". Journal of the American Chemical Society. 105 (7): 2092–2093. Bibcode:1983JAChS.105.2092B. doi:10.1021/ja00345a085. ISSN 0002-7863.
- Hayashi, Tamio; Konishi, Mitsuo; Kumada, Makoto (1982-09-01). "Optically active allylsilanes. 2. High stereoselectivity in asymmetric reaction with aldehydes producing homoallylic alcohols". Journal of the American Chemical Society. 104 (18): 4963–4965. Bibcode:1982JAChS.104.4963H. doi:10.1021/ja00382a046.
- Roush, William R.; Walts, Alan E.; Hoong, Lee K. (1985-12-01). "Diastereo- and enantioselective aldehyde addition reactions of 2-allyl-1,3,2-dioxaborolane-4,5-dicarboxylic esters, a useful class of tartrate ester modified allylboronates". Journal of the American Chemical Society. 107 (26): 8186–8190. Bibcode:1985JAChS.107.8186R. doi:10.1021/ja00312a062.
- Brown, Herbert C.; Jadhav, Prabhakar K. (April 1983). "Asymmetric carbon-carbon bond formation via .beta.-allyldiisopinocampheylborane. Simple synthesis of secondary homoallylic alcohols with excellent enantiomeric purities". Journal of the American Chemical Society. 105 (7): 2092–2093. Bibcode:1983JAChS.105.2092B. doi:10.1021/ja00345a085. ISSN 0002-7863.
- Kinnaird, James W. A.; Ng, Pui Yee; Kubota, Katsumi; Wang, Xiaolun; Leighton, James L. (2002-07-01). "Strained Silacycles in Organic Synthesis: A New Reagent for the Enantioselective Allylation of Aldehydes". Journal of the American Chemical Society. 124 (27): 7920–7921. Bibcode:2002JAChS.124.7920K. doi:10.1021/ja0264908. ISSN 0002-7863. PMID 12095334.
- Short, Robert P.; Masamune, Satoru (March 1989). "Asymmetric allylboration with B-allyl-2-(trimethylsilyl)borolane". Journal of the American Chemical Society. 111 (5): 1892–1894. Bibcode:1989JAChS.111.1892S. doi:10.1021/ja00187a061. ISSN 0002-7863.
- Corey, E. J.; Yu, Chan Mo; Kim, Sung Soo (July 1989). "A practical and efficient method for enantioselective allylation of aldehydes". Journal of the American Chemical Society. 111 (14): 5495–5496. Bibcode:1989JAChS.111.5495C. doi:10.1021/ja00196a082. ISSN 0002-7863.
