= Krische allylation =

The Krische allylation involves the enantioselective iridium-catalyzed addition of an allyl group to an aldehyde or an alcohol, resulting in the formation of a secondary homoallylic alcohol. The mechanism of the Krische allylation involves primary alcohol dehydrogenation or, when using aldehyde reactants, hydrogen transfer from 2-propanol. Unlike other allylation methods, the Krische allylation avoids the use of preformed allyl metal reagents and enables the direct conversion of primary alcohols to secondary homoallylic alcohols (precluding alcohol to aldehyde oxidation).

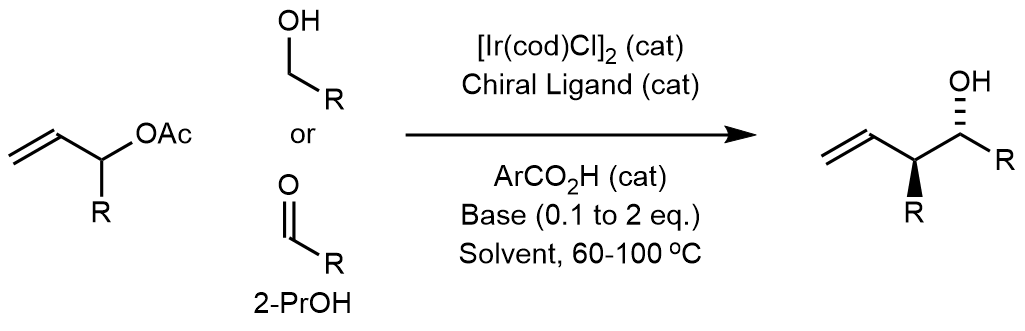
insert a caption here

== Background ==
Enantioselective carbonyl allylations are frequently applied to the synthesis of polyketide natural products. In 1978, Hoffmann reported the first asymmetric carbonyl allylation using a chiral allylmetal reagent, an allylborane derived from camphor. Subsequently, other chiral allylmetal reagents were developed by Kumada, Roush, Brown, Leighton, and others. These methods utilize preformed allyl metal reagents and generate stoichiometric quantities of metal byproducts.

In 1991, Yamamoto disclosed the first catalytic enantioselective method for carbonyl allylation, which employed a chiral boron Lewis acid-catalyst in combination with allyltrimethylsilane. Numerous catalytic enantioselective methods for carbonyl allylation followed, including work by Umani-Ronchi and Keck. While these methods had a significant impact, they do not circumvent the use of preformed allylmetal reagents. Catalytic variants of the Nozaki-Hiyama-Kishi reaction represent an alternative method for asymmetric carbonyl allylation, but stoichiometric metallic reductants are required.

Whereas the allylmetal reagents used in these first-generation technologies are often difficult to prepare and handle, the Krische allylation exploits highly tractable allylic acetates. Additionally, the Krische allylation avoids the use of preformed allyl metal reagents or metallic reductants and chiral auxiliaries, significantly reducing waste generation.

== Reaction features ==
The Krische allylation involves “transfer hydrogenative” carbon-carbon bond formations. In a series of papers published in the early 2000s, Krische and coworkers demonstrated that allenes, dienes, and allyl acetates could be converted to transient allylmetal nucleophiles via hydrogenation, transfer hydrogenation or hydrogen auto-transfer. This strategy for enantioselective carbonyl allylation avoids preformed organometallic reagents or metallic reductants. A remarkable feature of these reactions is the ability to conduct carbonyl allylation from the alcohol oxidation state. Due to a kinetic preference for primary alcohol dehydrogenation, diols containing both primary and secondary alcohols undergo site-selective carbonyl allylation at the primary alcohol without the need for protecting groups. Additionally, by using alcohol reactants, the use of chiral α-stereogenic aldehydes, which are prone to racemization, can be avoided.

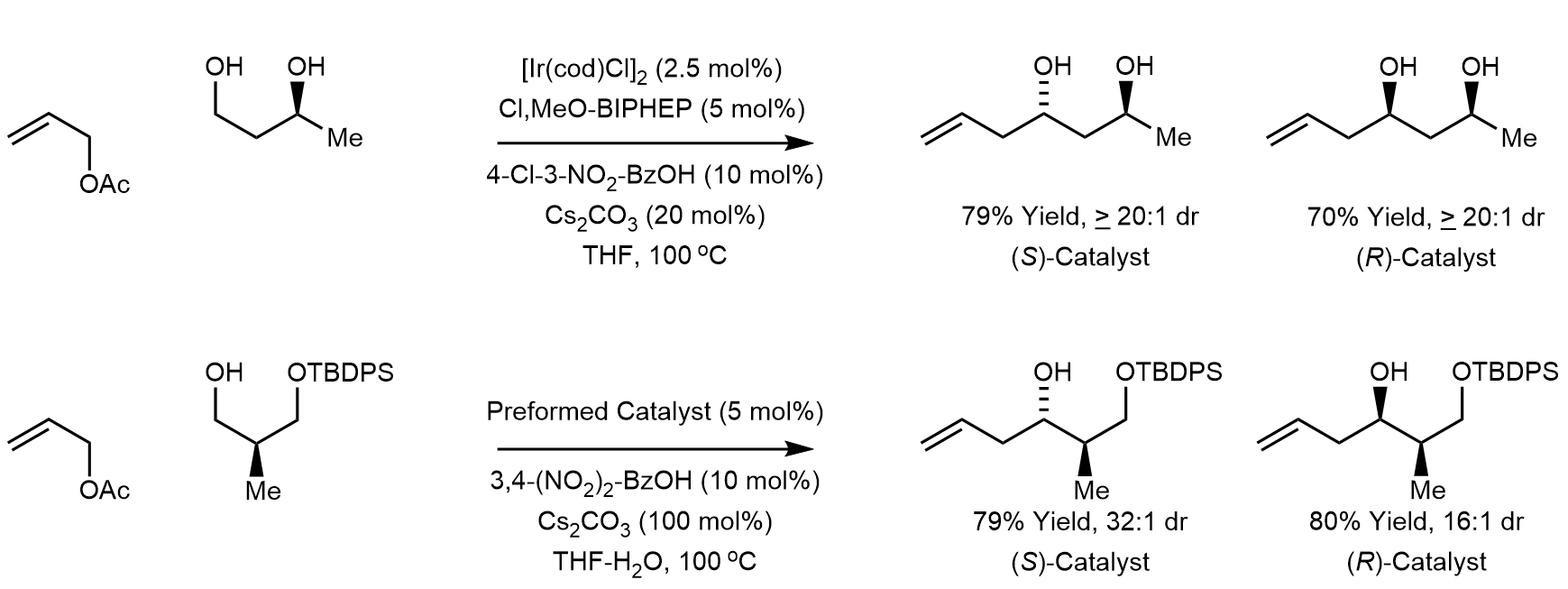
insert a caption here

The excellent functional group compatibility of the Krische allylation combined with the tractability of the allyl acetate pronucleophiles enables the use of allyl donors bearing highly complex nitrogen-rich substituents.

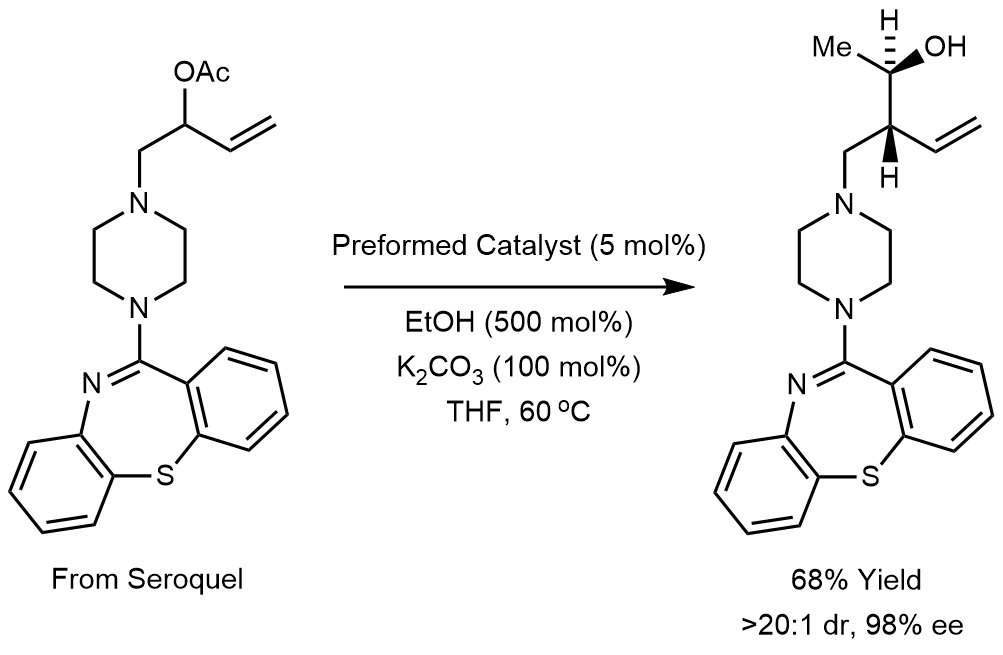
insert a caption here

The figure below shows some of the different allyl donors that have been used in the Krische allylation. These methods are summarized in the review literature.

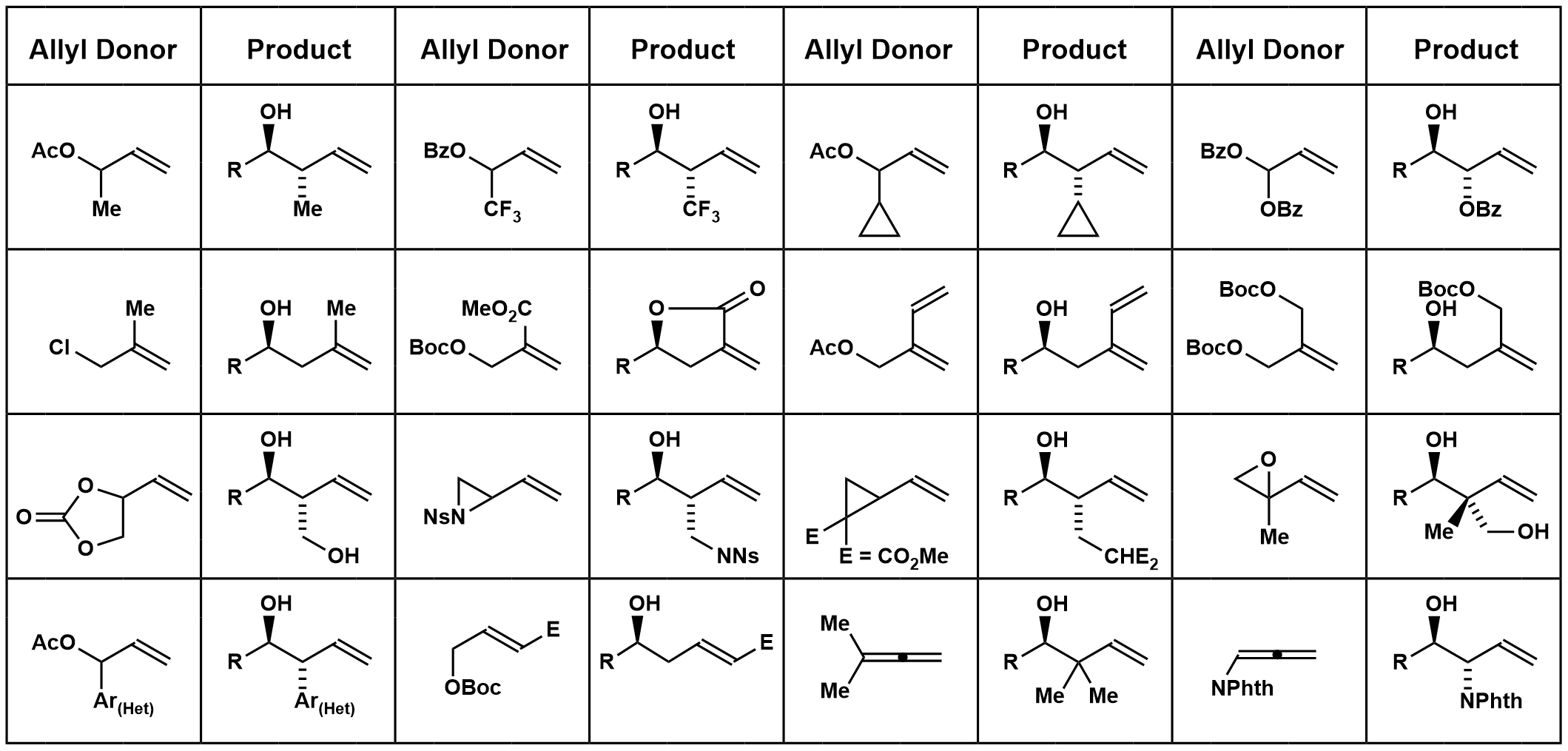
insert a caption here

== Mechanism ==
The active catalyst in the Krische allylation is a cyclometallated π-allyliridium C,O-benzoate complex. This complex can be generated in situ or can be isolated via precipitation or conventional chromatography on silica gel.

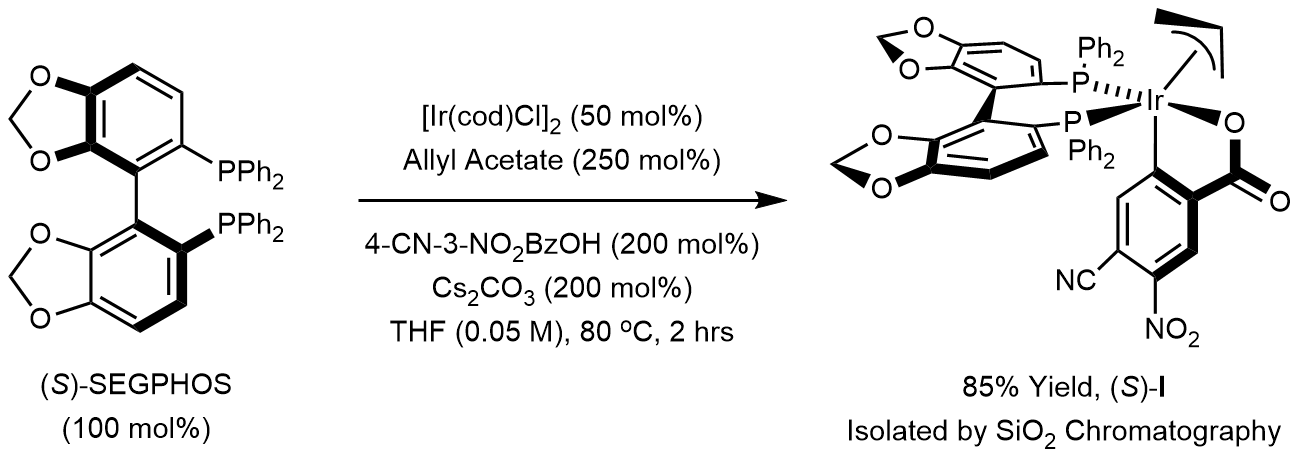
Catalytic cycle 1-2

The mechanism of the Krische allylation has been corroborated by DFT calculations. Entry into the catalytic cycle involves protonation of the cyclometallated π-allyliridium precatalyst to generate the iridium alkoxide I. β-Hydride elimination of alkoxide I generates the aldehyde, which dissociates to form the iridium hydride III. Deprotonation of the iridium hydride III provides an anionic iridium(I) species IV, which upon oxidative addition to the allyl donor forms the π-allyliridium complex V. Association of the aldehyde to the σ-allyliridium species VI triggers carbonyl addition by way of the six-centered transition structure VII to form the homoallylic alkoxide VIII. The homoallylic alkoxide VIII is stable with respect to beta-hydride elimination due to coordination of the double bond with the metal. Exchange with the primary alcohol reactant regenerates the iridium alkoxide I and releases the reaction product.

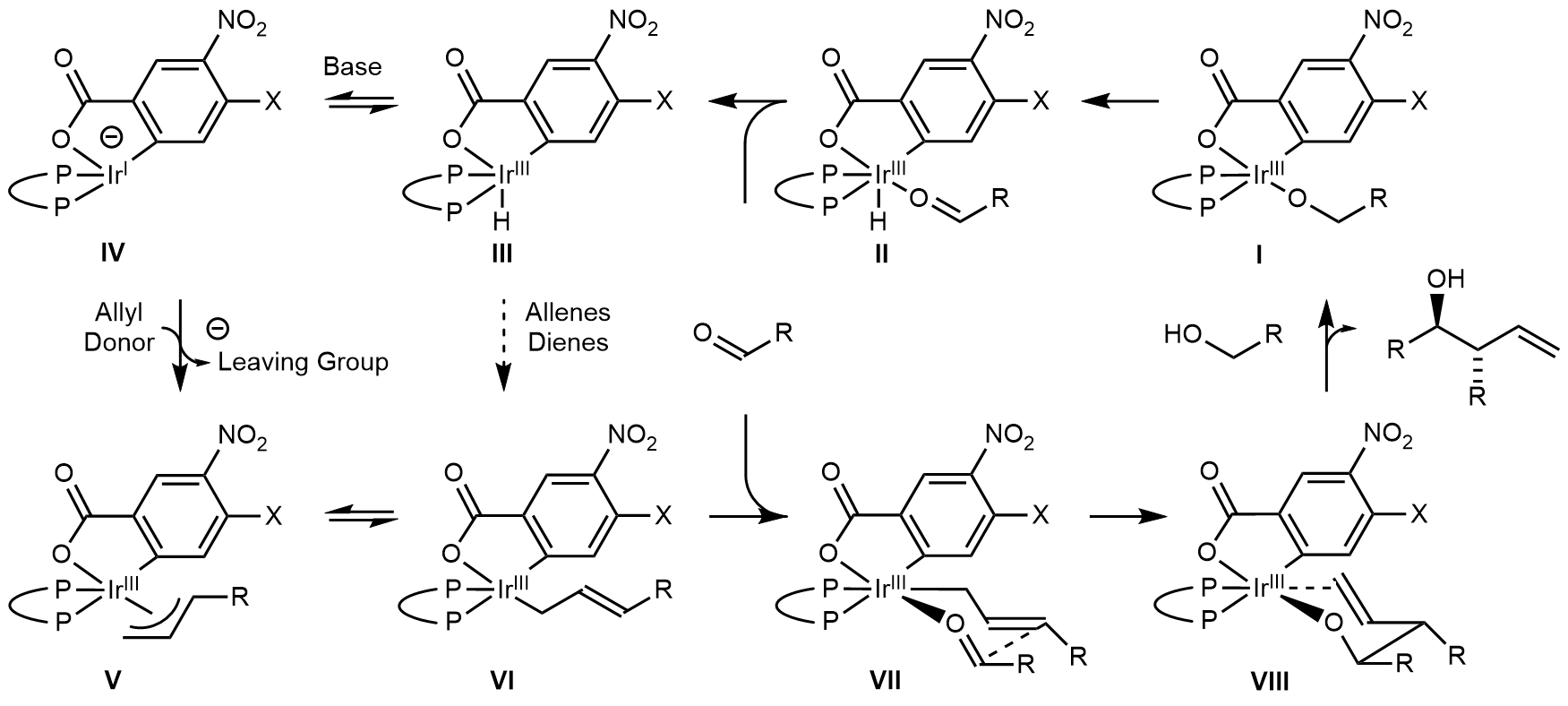
Catalytic cycle 1-2

== Applications in synthesis ==
Iridium-catalyzed transfer-hydrogenative carbonyl allylation method has been applied to the synthesis of polyketide natural products. Some examples are shown below. In every case, the target compound was prepared in significantly fewer steps than was previously achieved. For example, total syntheses of roxaticin, bryostatin and cryptocaryol were accomplished via double Krische allylation of 1,3-propane diol. This method was also used in the synthesis of mandelalide A.

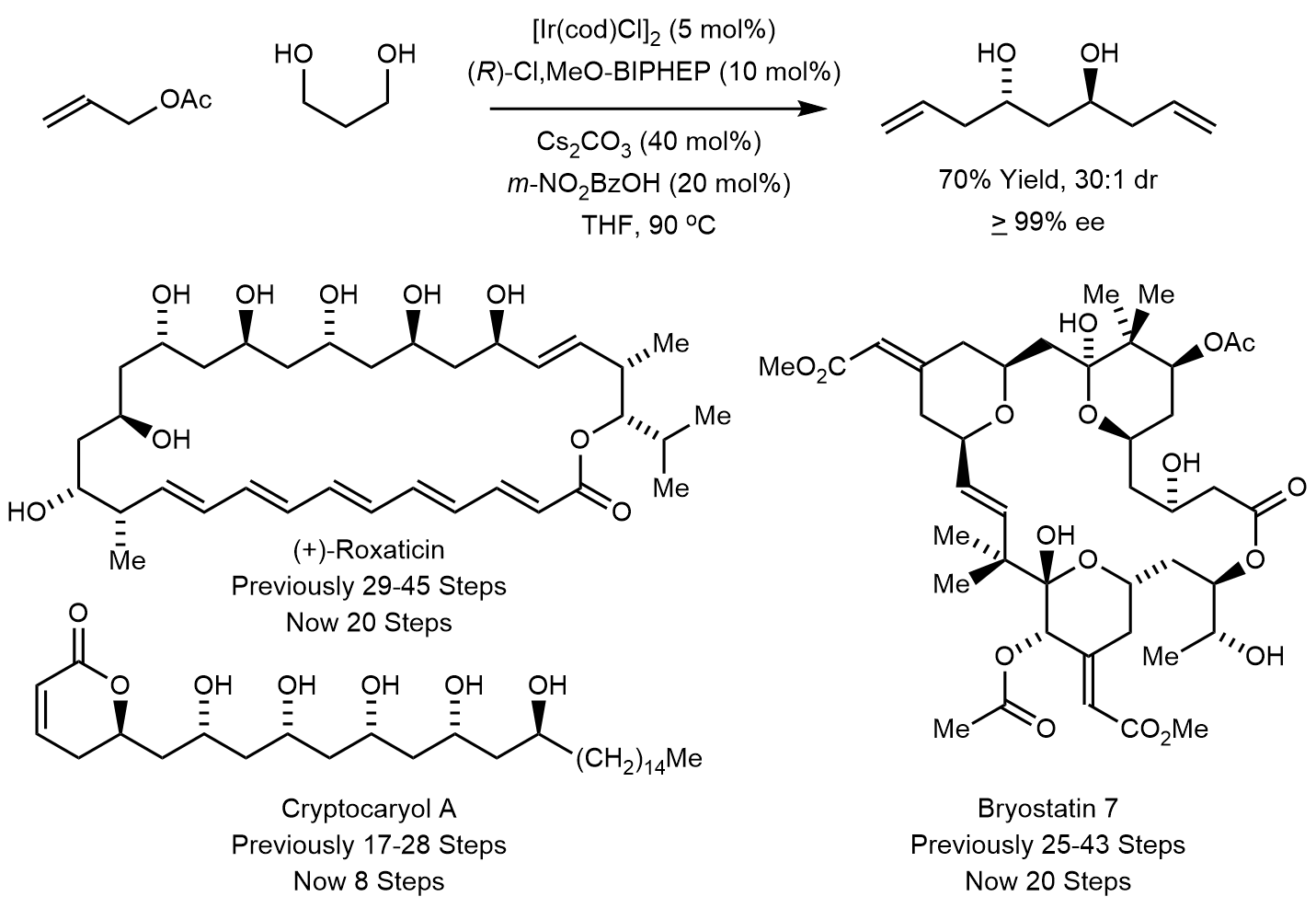
Krische allylation in the synthesis of bryostatin 7,

The Krische bisallylation has been applied to the synthesis of psymberin in 17 LLS and 32 total steps. Through the use of the Krische allylation, this synthesis was accomplished via a much shorter route than previous syntheses. The Krische allylation to his synthesis of callyspongiolide using the chiral SEGPHOS catalyst complex. In 2018, Harran also prepared callyspongiolide using the Krische allylation as a convergent method for fragment union. Double crotylation was used by Krische to prepare 6-deoxyerythronolide B and swinholide A.

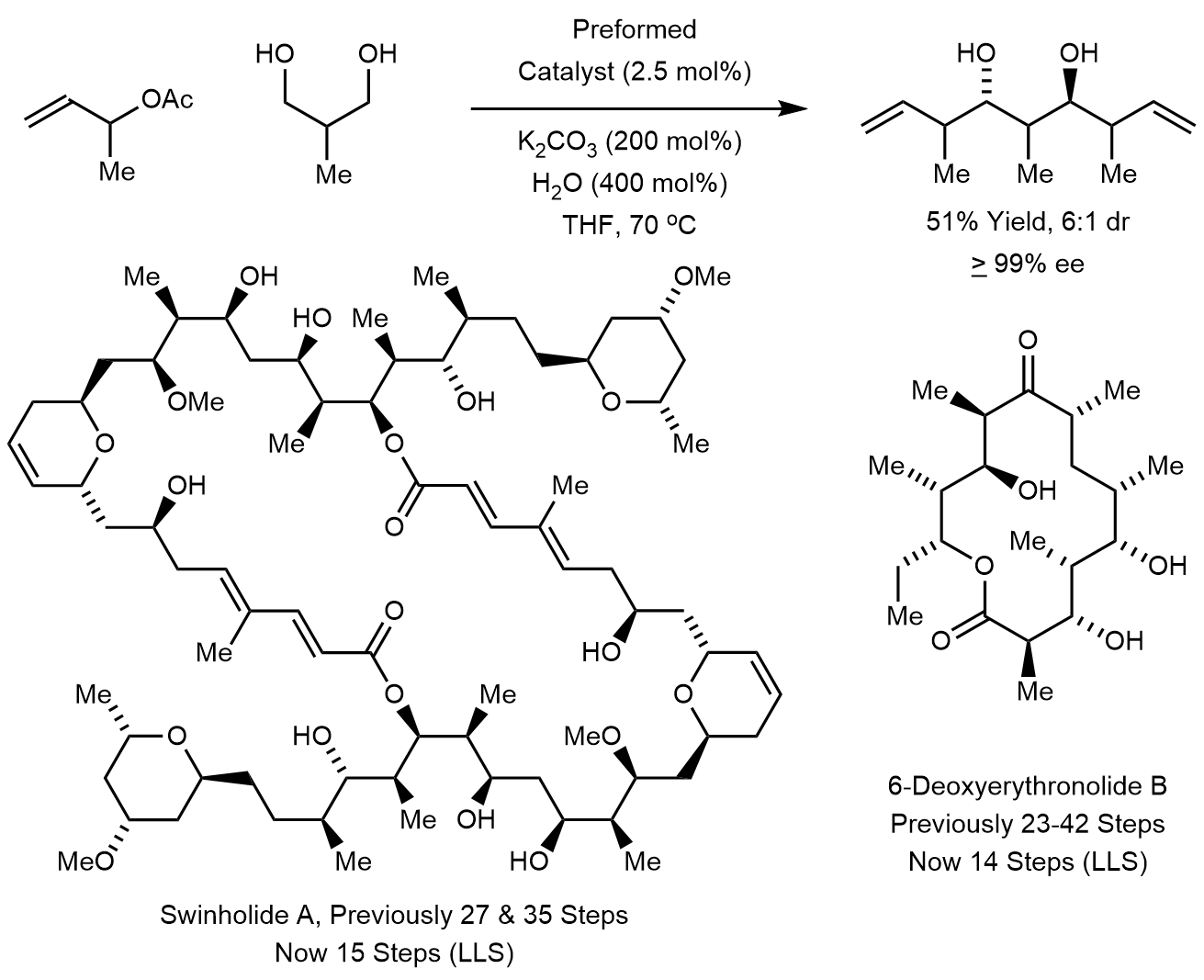
Synthesis of Psymberin

== Related articles ==
- Organostannane addition
- Carbonyl allylation
