= Organostannane addition =

Nucleophilic addition of an allyl, allenyl or propargyl-stannane

Organostannane addition is reaction involving the nucleophilic addition of an allyl-, allenyl-, or propargyl-stannane to an aldehyde, imine, or (in rare cases) a ketone. This reaction is widely used for carbonyl allylation.

The addition of an organostannane to carbonyl group is one of the most common and efficient methods for the production of contiguous, oxygen-containing stereocenters in organic molecules. Since many naturally-occurring polymers contain this stereochemical motif, such as polypropionate and polyacetate, organostannane addition has been studied extensively by natural products chemists as a synthetically and commercially-important reaction.

Organostannanes are very stable molecules, favoured for their ease of handling and selective reactivity. Chiral allylstannanes are known to react stereoselectively, yielding single diastereomers. The production of substituted allylstannanes containing either one or two new stereocenters can be achieved by this method with a very high degree of stereocontrol.

(1)

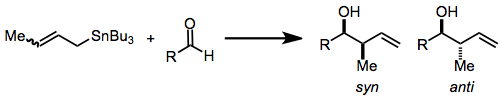

However, stoichiometrically relative amounts of metal-containing byproducts are generated by this reaction, and addition to sterically encumbered pi-bonds in ketones, are uncommon.

== Mechanism and stereochemistry ==
=== Prevailing mechanism ===
Three modes allow the addition of allylstannanes to carbonyls: thermal addition, Lewis-acid-promoted addition, and addition involving prior transmetalation. Each of these modes invokes a unique model for stereocontrol, but in all cases, a distinction is made between reagent and substrate control. Substrate-controlled additions typically involve chiral aldehydes or imines and invoke the Felkin-Anh model. When all reagents are achiral, only simple diastereoselectivity (syn versus anti, see above) must be considered. Addition takes place via an S_{E}' mechanism involving concerted dissociation of tin and C-C bond formation at the γ position.

With the allylstannane and aldehyde in high-temperature conditions, addition proceeds through a six-membered, cyclic transition state, with the tin center serving as an organizing element. The configuration of the double bond in the allylstannane controls the sense of diastereoselectivity of the reaction.

(2)

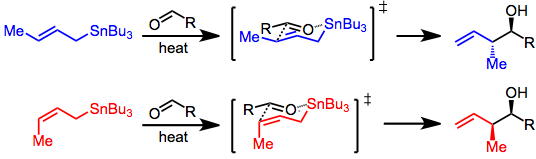

This is not the case in Lewis-acid-promoted reactions, in which either the (Z)- or (E)-stannane affords the syn product predominantly (Type II). The origin of this selectivity has been debated, and depends on the relative energies of a number of acyclic transition states. (E)-Stannanes exhibit higher syn selectivity than the corresponding (Z)-stannanes.

(3)

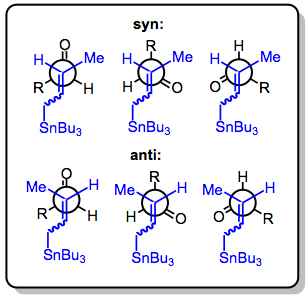

In the presence of certain Lewis acids, transmetalation may occur before addition. Complex reaction mixtures may result if transmetalation is not complete or if an equilibrium between allylic isomers exists. Tin(IV) chloride and indium(III) chloride have been employed for useful reactions in this mode.

(4)

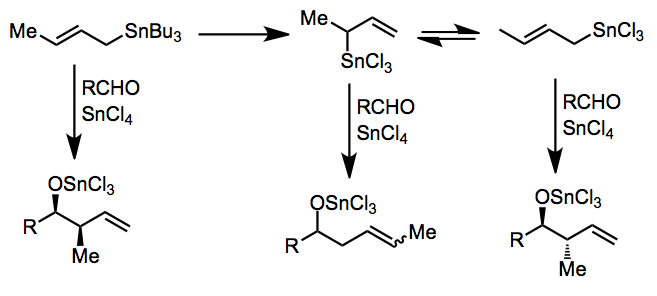

=== Enantioselective variants ===
A wide variety of enantioselective additions employing chiral, non-racemic Lewis acids are known. The chiral (acyloxy)borane or "CAB" catalyst 1, titanium-BINOL system 2, and silver-BINAP system 3 provide addition products in high ee via the Lewis-acid-promoted mechanism described above.

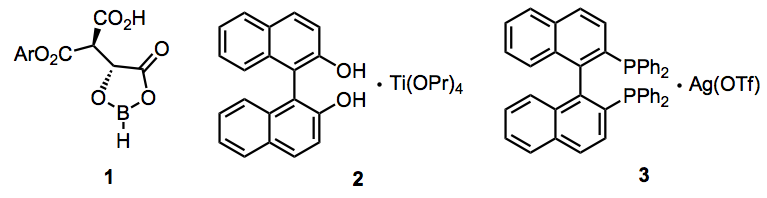

== Scope and limitations ==
Thermal additions of stannanes are limited (because of the high temperatures and pressures required) to only simple aldehyde substrates. Lewis acid promoted and transmetalation reactions are much milder and have achieved synthetic utility. Intramolecular addition gives five- or six-membered rings under Lewis acidic or thermal conditions.

(6)

The possibility of incorporating oxygen-containing substituents into allyl- and allenylstannanes expands their scope and utility substantially over methods relying on more reactive organometallics. These compounds are usually prepared by enantioselective reduction with a chiral reducing agent such as BINAL-H. In the presence of a Lewis acid, isomerization of α-alkoxy allylstannanes to the corresponding γ-alkoxy isomers takes place.

(7)

The use of chiral electrophiles is common and can provide "double diastereoselection" if the stannane is also chiral. Chelation control using Lewis acids such as magnesium bromide can lead to high stereoselectivities for reactions of α-alkoxy aldehydes.

(8)

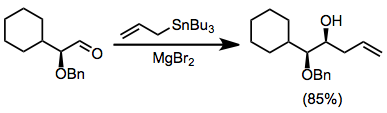

Nucleophilic addition to propargyl mesylates or tosylates is used to form allenylstannanes. These compounds react similarly to allylstannanes to afford homopropargyl alcohols, and any of the three reaction modes described above can be used with this class of reagents as well.

(9)

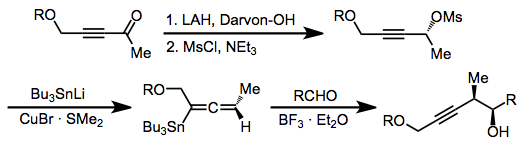

Imines are less reactive than the corresponding aldehydes, but palladium catalysis can be used to facilitate addition into imines. The use of iminium ions as electrophiles has also been reported.

(10)

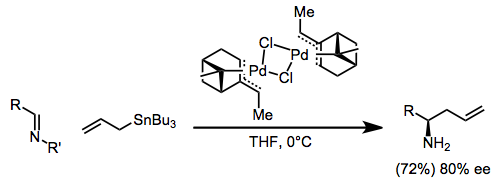

== Synthetic applications ==
The chiral allylic stannane 1 adds to acrolein to yield the 1,5-syn diastereomer as a single stereoisomer. A subsequent sigmatropic rearrangement increased the distance between the stereocenters even further. This step was carried out en route to (±)-patulolide C.

(11)

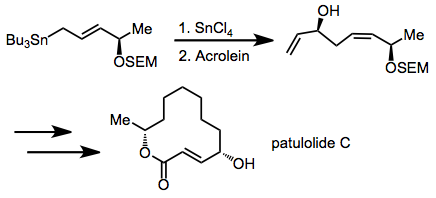

Repeated use of the allylic stannane addition in an intramolecular sense was used in the synthesis of hemibrevetoxin B (one example is shown below). The pseudoequatorial positions of both "appendages" in the starting material lead to the observed stereoisomer.

(12)

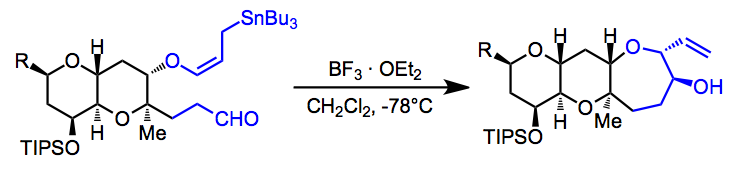

== Related articles ==
- Krische allylation
- Carbonyl allylation
