= Hydrogen auto-transfer =

Mechanism of the hydroxyl substitution hydrogen auto-transfer reaction.

Mechanism of one type of carbonyl addition hydrogen auto-transfer reaction involving hydrometalation (step 2).

Hydrogen auto-transfer, also known as borrowing hydrogen, is the activation of a chemical reaction by temporary transfer of two hydrogen atoms from the reactant to a catalyst and return of those hydrogen atoms back to a reaction intermediate to form the final product. Two major classes of borrowing hydrogen reactions exist: (a) those that result in hydroxyl substitution, and (b) those that result in carbonyl addition. In the former case, alcohol dehydrogenation generates a transient carbonyl compound that is subject to condensation followed by the return of hydrogen. In the latter case, alcohol dehydrogenation is followed by reductive generation of a nucleophile, which triggers carbonyl addition. As borrowing hydrogen processes avoid manipulations otherwise required for discrete alcohol oxidation and the use of stoichiometric organometallic reagents, they typically display high levels of atom-economy and, hence, are viewed as examples of Green chemistry.

== History ==
The Guerbet reaction, reported in 1899, is an early example of a hydrogen auto-transfer process. The Guerbet reaction converts primary alcohols to β-alkylated dimers via alcohol dehydrogenation followed by aldol condensation and reduction of the resulting enones. Application of the Guerbet reaction to the development of ethanol-to-butanol processes has garnered interest as a method for the production of renewable fuels. In 1932 using heterogeneous nickel-catalysts Adkins reported the first alcohol aminations that occur through alcohol dehydrogenation-reductive amination. Homogenous catalysts for alcohol amination based on rhodium and ruthenium were developed by Grigg and Watanabe in 1981. The first hydrogen auto-transfer processes that convert primary alcohols to products of carbonyl addition were reported by Michael J. Krische in 2007-2008 using homogenous iridium and ruthenium catalysts.

== Hydroxyl substitution ==
Alcohol aminations are among the most commonly utilized borrowing hydrogen processes. In reactions of this type, alcohol dehydrogenation is followed by reductive amination of the resulting carbonyl compound. This represents an alternative to two-step processes involving conversion of the alcohol to a halide or sulfonate ester followed by nucleophilic substitution

As shown below, alcohol amination has been used on kilogram scale by Pfizer for the synthesis of advanced pharmaceutical intermediates. Additionally, AstraZeneca has used methanol as an alternative to conventional genotoxic methylating agents such as methyl iodide or dimethyl sulfate. Nitroaromatics can also participate as amine precursors in borrowing hydrogen-type alcohol aminations.

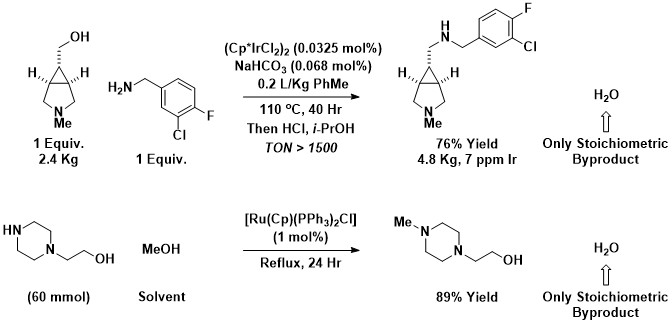

The formation of carbon–carbon bonds have been achieved through borrowing hydrogen-type indirect Wittig, aldol, Knoevenagel condensations and also through various carbon nucleophiles. Related to the Guerbet reaction, Donohoe and coworkers have developed enantioselective borrowing hydrogen-type enolate alkylations.

== Carbonyl addition ==
As exemplified by the Krische allylation, dehydrogenation of alcohol reactants can be balanced by reduction of allenes, dienes or allyl acetate to generate allylmetal-carbonyl pairs that combine to give products of carbonyl addition. In this way, lower alcohols are directly transformed to higher alcohols in a manner that significantly decreases waste.

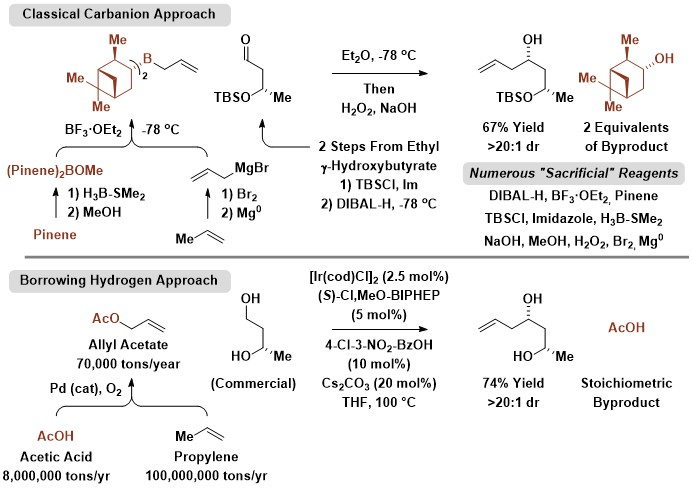

In 2008, borrowing hydrogen reactions of 1,3-enynes with alcohols to form products of carbonyl propargylation was discovered. An enantioselective variant of this method was recently used in the total synthesis of leiodermatolide A.

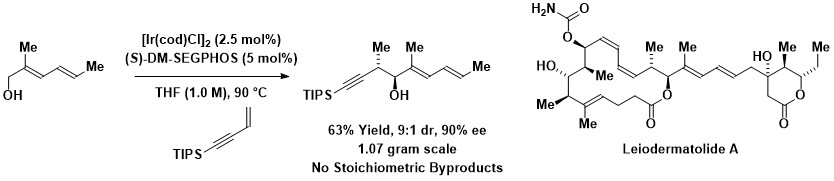
