= Hideki Sakurai =

Japanese chemist (1931–2024)

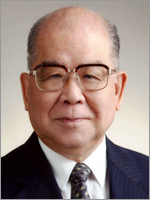
- Born: May 16, 1931
- Died: July 17, 2024 (aged 93)
- Education: University of Tokyo
- Known for: Sakurai reaction
- Awards: Frederic Stanley Kipping Award in Silicon Chemistry, American Chemical Society (1978); Wacker Silicone Award (1991)
- Scientific career
- Workplaces: Osaka City University (1958-1960); Harvard University (1960-1963); Kyoto University (1963-1969); Tohoku University (1969-1995); Tokyo University of Science (1995-); Chairman of the Board, Miyagi Organization For Industry Promotion; CEO, The 21st Century Plaza Research Center (Sendai)
- Doctoral advisor: Osamu Shimamura

Hideki Sakurai (櫻井 英樹, Sakurai Hideki; May 16, 1931 – July 17, 2024) was a Japanese chemist and professor at Tohoku University. He discovered the Sakurai reaction in 1976. He received the Frederic Stanley Kipping Award from the American Chemical Society in 1978. Sakurai died on July 17, 2024, at the age of 93.

== Sources ==
- Mitsuo Kira (1995). "Hideki Sakurai". Journal of Organometallic Chemistry. 499 (1–2): vii–x. doi:10.1016/0022-328X(95)90915-2.
