= Sakurai reaction =

Chemical reaction

Named after	Hideki Sakurai; Akira Hosomi
Reaction type	Addition reaction

Identifiers
Organic Chemistry Portal	hosomi-sakurai-reaction
RSC ontology ID	RXNO:0000443

The Sakurai reaction (also known as the Hosomi–Sakurai reaction) is the chemical reaction of carbon electrophiles (such as a ketone shown here) with allyltrimethylsilane catalyzed by strong Lewis acids. The reaction achieves results similar to the addition of an allyl Grignard reagent to the carbonyl.

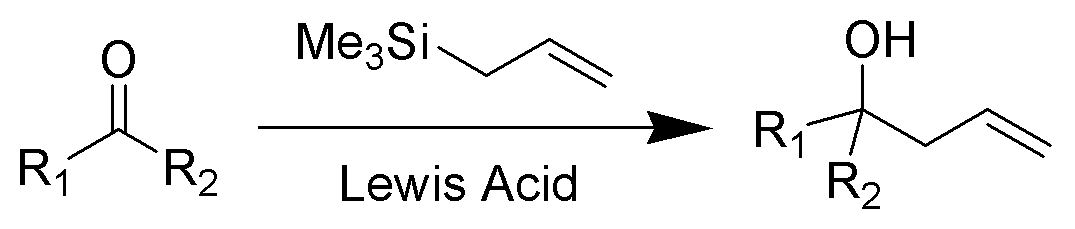
The Sakurai reaction

Strong Lewis acids such as titanium tetrachloride, boron trifluoride, tin tetrachloride, and AlCl(Et)_{2} are all effective in promoting the Sakurai reaction. The reaction involves electrophilic allyl shift via a beta-silyl carbocationic intermediate, the beta-silicon effect.

== Mechanism ==
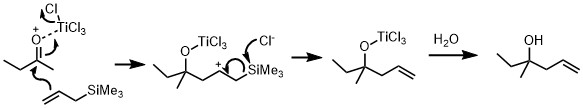
Figure 1: Sakurai reaction showing allylation of a ketone

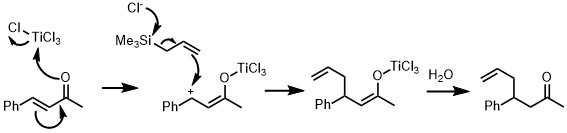
Figure 2: Sakurai reaction showing allylation of an enone

Allylation of a carbonyl ketone (compound containing a ketone group and two different functional groups) has been shown. In the given reaction, the electrophilic compound (carbon with a ketone group) is treated with titanium tetrachloride, a strong Lewis acid and allyltrimethylsilane. According to the general principle, the Lewis acid first activates the electrophilic carbon in presence of allyltrimethylsilane which then undergoes nucleophilic attack from electrons on the allylic silane. The silicon plays the key role in stabilizing the carbocation of carbon at the β-position. The Sakurai reaction is also applicable for other functional groups such as enones, where conjugate addition is usually seen. In figure 2, the Sakurai reaction has been shown using a cinnamoyl ketone. This reaction follows the same mechanism as the previous reaction shown here.

As displayed in the scheme, the Sakurai reaction is proposed to give a secondary carbocation intermediate. Secondary carbocations are high in energy, however it is stabilized by the silicon substituent ("β-silicon effect", a form of silicon-hyperconjugation).

== Literature of historic interest ==
- Sakurai, Hideki; Hosomi, Akira; Kumada, Makoto (1969). "Addition of trichloromethyl radicals to alkenylsilanes". The Journal of Organic Chemistry. 36 (4): 1764–1768. doi:10.1021/jo01258a052.
- Hosomi, Akíra; Sakurai, Hideki (1976). "Syntheses of γ,δ-unsaturated alcohols from allylsilanes and carbonyl compounds in the presence of titanium tetrachloride". Tetrahedron Letters. 17 (16): 1295–1298. doi:10.1016/S0040-4039(00)78044-0. ISSN 0040-4039.
- (Hosomi, Akira; Endo, Masahiko; Sakurai, Hideki (5 September 1976). "Allylsilanes as synthetic intermediates. ii. syntheses of homoallyl ethers from allylsilanes and acetals promoted by titanium tetrachloride". Chemistry Letters. 5 (9): 941–942. doi:10.1246/cl.1976.941. ISSN 0366-7022.
- Hosomi, Akira; Sakurai, Hideki (1 March 1977). "Chemistry of organosilicon compounds. 99. Conjugate addition of allylsilanes to .alpha.,.beta.-enones. A New method of stereoselective introduction of the angular allyl group in fused cyclic .alpha.,.beta.-enones". Journal of the American Chemical Society. 99 (5): 1673–1675. Bibcode:1977JAChS..99.1673H. doi:10.1021/ja00447a080. ISSN 0002-7863.
