= SEGPHOS =

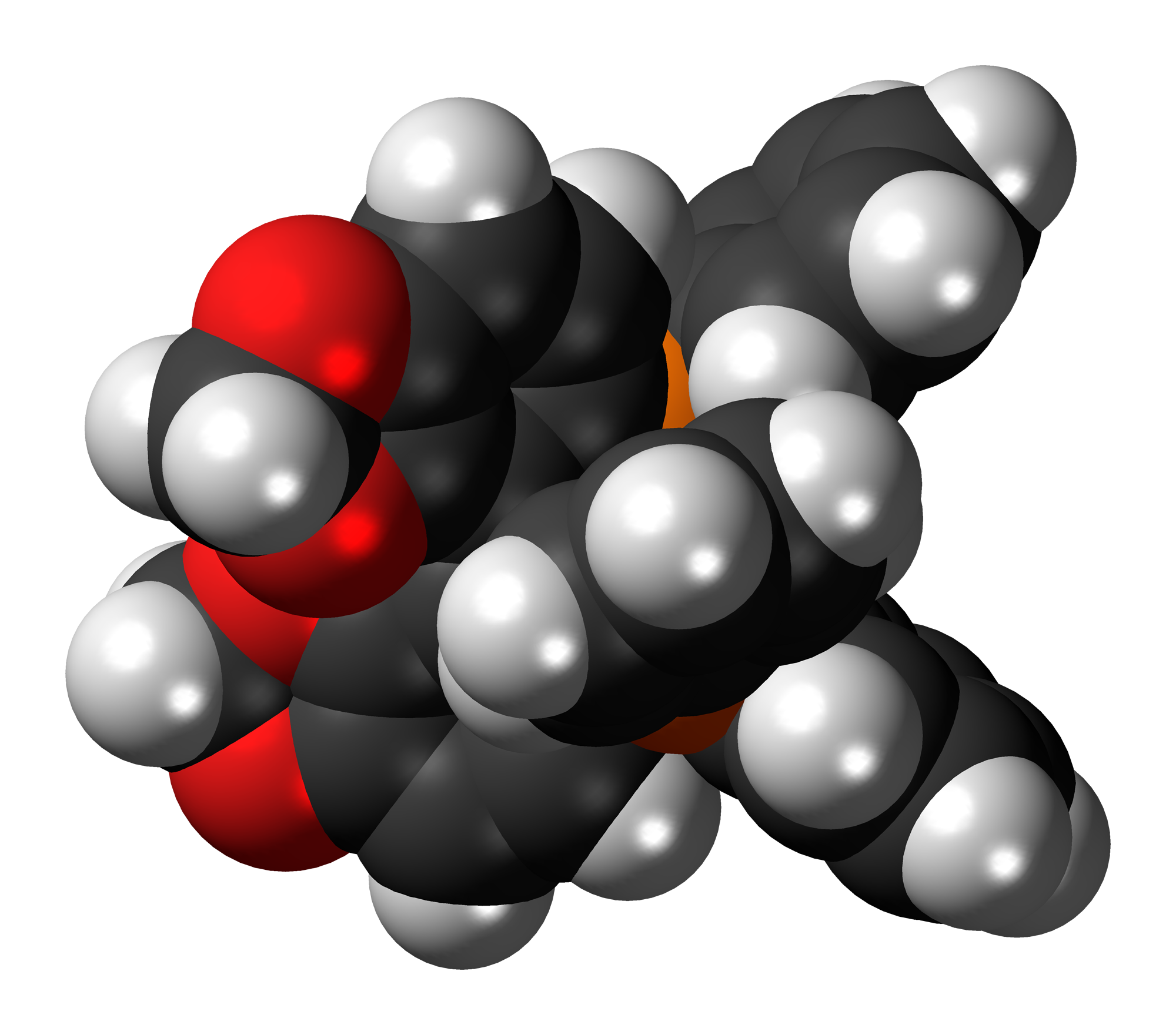

Names
- Preferred IUPAC name (2H,2′H-[4,4′-Bi-1,3-benzodioxole]-5,5′-diyl)bis(diphenylphosphane)
- Other names SEGPHOS; 5,5′-Bis(diphenylphosphino)-4,4′-bi-1,3-benzodioxole

Identifiers
CAS Number	244261-66-3 (R); 210169-54-3 (S)
3D model (JSmol)	(RS): Interactive image
ChemSpider	9192694 (RS)
PubChem CID	11017510 (RS)
CompTox Dashboard (EPA)	DTXSID101145953
- InChI: InChI=1S/C38H28O4P2/c1-5-13-27(14-6-1)43(28-15-7-2-8-16-28)33-23-21-31-37(41-25-39-31)35(33)36-34(24-22-32-38(36)42-26-40-32)44(29-17-9-3-10-18-29)30-19-11-4-12-20-30/h1-24H,25-26H2 Key: RZZDRSHFIVOQAF-UHFFFAOYSA-N
- SMILES: (RS): C1OC2=C(O1)C(=C(C=C2)P(C3=CC=CC=C3)C4=CC=CC=C4)C5=C(C=CC6=C5OCO6)P(C7=CC=CC=C7)C8=CC=CC=C8

Properties
Chemical formula	C_{38}H_{28}O_{4}P_{2}
Molar mass	610.57 g/mol
Appearance	colorless solid
Solubility in water	organic solvents
- Except where otherwise noted, data are given for materials in their standard state (at 25 °C [77 °F], 100 kPa). verify (what is ?) Infobox references

SEGPHOS is a chiral ligand developed by Takasago International Corporation that is used in asymmetric synthesis. It was developed after BINAP and was investigated since it has a narrower dihedral angle between the aromatic faces. This was predicted and then confirmed to increase the enantioselectivity and activity of metal complexes of SEGPHOS. After its commercialization, SEGPHOS and its substituted derivatives have been found to constitute a privileged ligand class for a variety of transition metal catalysts and chemical transformations beyond its original application in ruthenium-catalyzed enantioselective hydrogenation.

In addition to the parent ligand bearing phenyl groups on the phosphorus atoms, the bulkier derivatives DM-SEGPHOS and DTBM-SEGPHOS are also commercially available. In DM-SEGPHOS and DTBM-SEGPHOS, the phenyl groups of SEGPHOS are replaced by 3,5-dimethylphenyl and 3,5-di-tert-butyl-4-methoxyphenyl groups, respectively.

According to Takasago, as BINAP is likened to a butterfly, SEGPHOS is like a seagull that "flies higher and faster" than a butterfly. Thus the ligand was named SE(A)G(ULL) + PHOS.

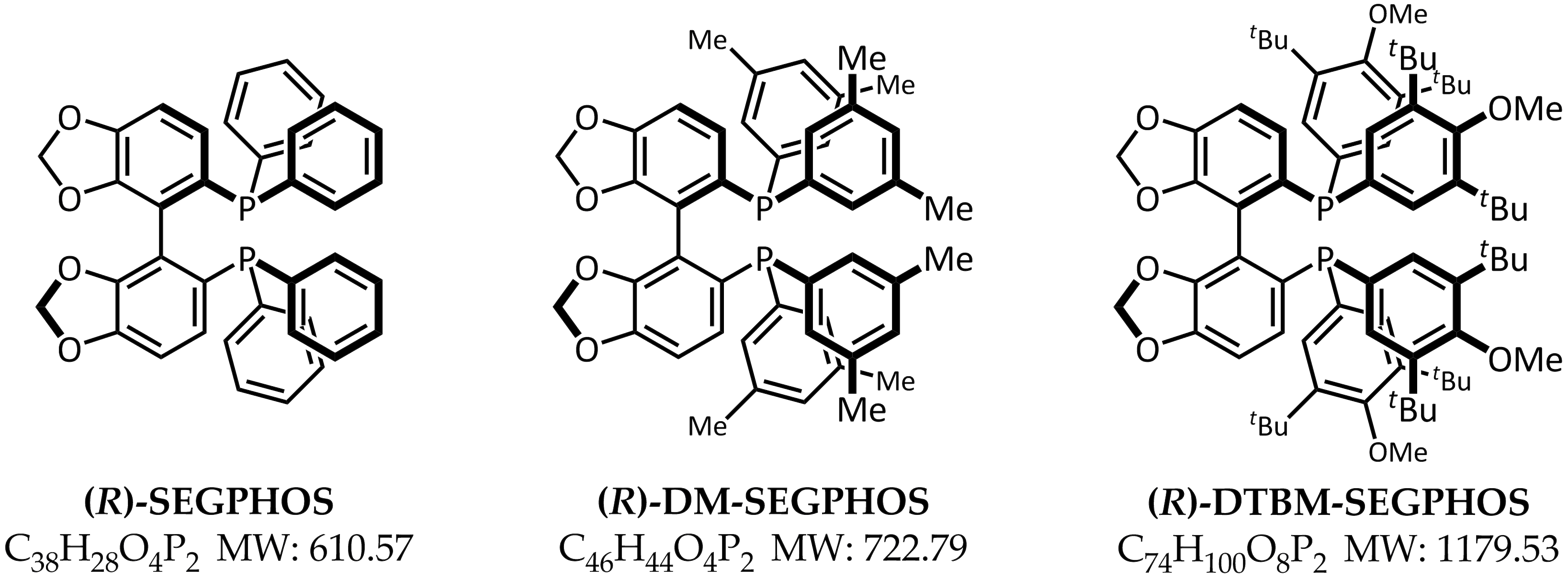
