= Michael J. Krische =

American chemist (born 1966)

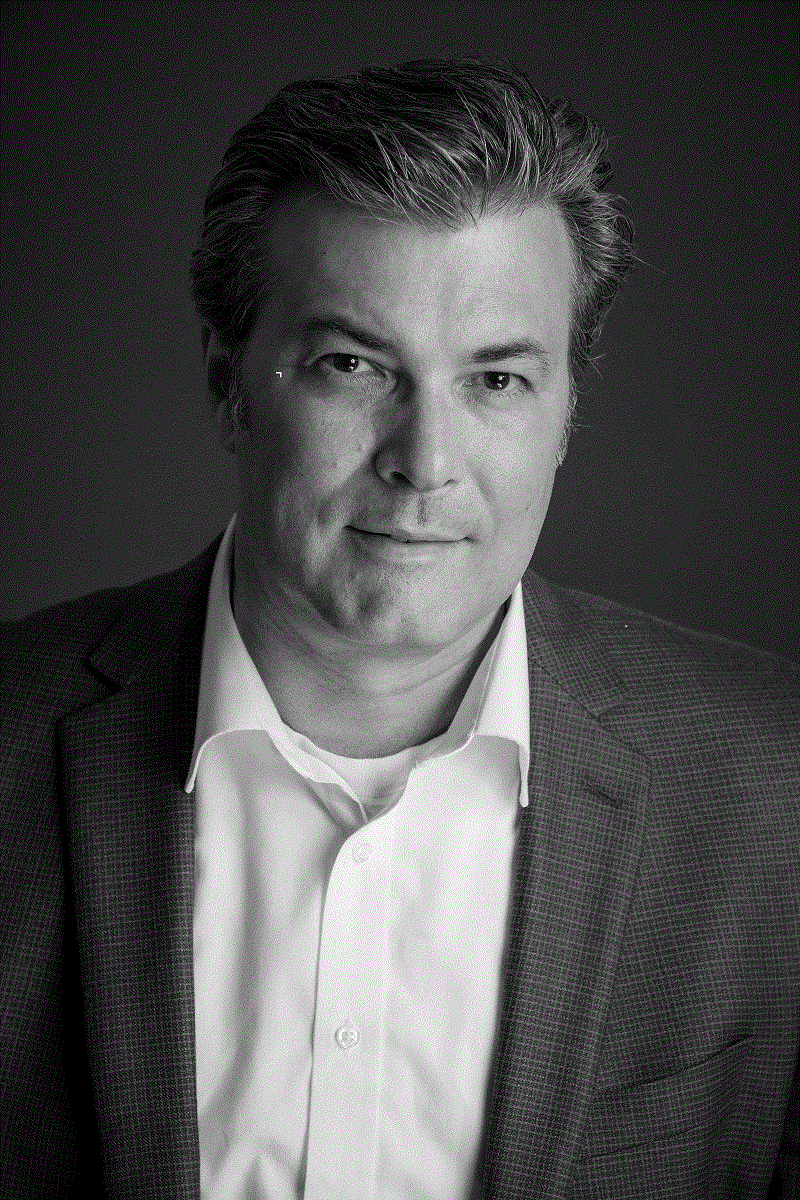
- Michael J. Krische in 2014
- Born: 16 September 1966 (age 60); Burlingame, California
- Education: University of California, Berkeley; Stanford University
- Known for: Krische allylation
- Scientific career
- Fields: Chemistry
- Workplaces: University of Texas at Austin
- Doctoral advisor: Barry Trost

Michael J. Krische (FRSC, FAAAS; born September 16, 1966) is an American chemist and Robert A. Welch Chair in Science at the Department of Chemistry, University of Texas at Austin. Krische has pioneered a broad, new family of catalytic C-C bond formations that occur through the addition or redistribution of hydrogen. These processes merge the characteristics of catalytic hydrogenation and carbonyl addition, contributing to a departure from the use of stoichiometric organometallic reagents in chemical synthesis.

== Life ==
Krische was born in 1966 in Burlingame, California, a city on the San Francisco peninsula. He is the son of Joseph Krische, a Gottschee German who immigrated to the USA in 1952 after a 7-year period in the Kapfenberg displaced persons camp following WWII, and Corliss Krische (née Heimburger), who is a native of Urbana, Illinois.

== Education and career ==
Michael J. Krische obtained a B.S. degree in chemistry from the University of California, Berkeley (1986–1989), where he performed research with Henry Rapoport. After one year abroad as a Fulbright Fellow between 1989 and 1990 at University of Helsinki, he initiated doctoral studies in chemistry in 1990 at Stanford University with Barry Trost as a Veatch Graduate Fellow. Following receipt of his Ph.D. degree (1996), he joined the laboratory of Nobel Laureate Jean-Marie Lehn at the Universite Louis Pasteur (now University of Strasbourg) as an NIH Post-Doctoral Fellow. In 1999, he joined the faculty at the University of Texas at Austin. Krische was promoted directly to the rank of full professor (2004), and shortly thereafter appointed the Robert A. Welch Chair in Science (2007).

== Research ==
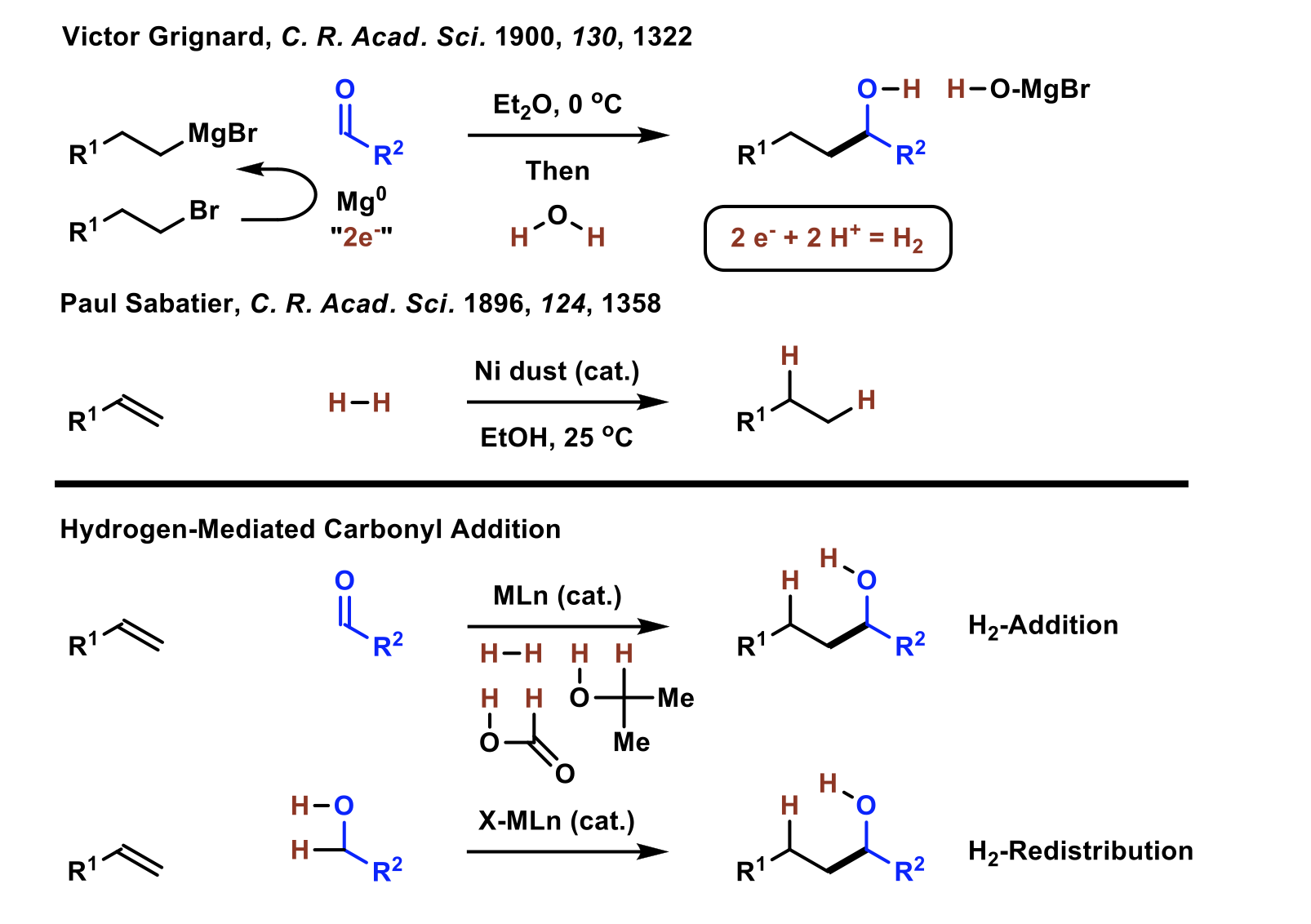
Hydrogen-mediated carbonyl addition merges the characteristics of carbonyl addition and hydrogenation

Stereo- and site-selective methods for the byproduct-free modification of unprotected organic compounds that occur through the addition or redistribution of hydrogen are natural endpoints in the advancement of methods for efficient, green chemical synthesis. Krische has demonstrated hydrogenation or transfer hydrogenation of π-unsaturated reactants in the presence of C=X (X = O, NR) bonds delivers products of carbonyl or imine addition. In related hydrogen auto-transfer reactions, alcohols served dually as reductants and carbonyl proelectrophiles, enabling direct, stereo- and site-selective conversion of lower alcohols to higher alcohols. The Krische allylation exemplifies the latter class of C-C coupling. Application of these methods in natural product total synthesis have been shown to increase step-economy. For example, a concise total synthesis of swinholide A was achieved using diverse hydrogen-mediated C-C couplings.

== Major awards ==
- NSF-CAREER Award (2000)
- Cottrell Scholar Award (2002)
- Eli Lilly Granteeship for Untenured Faculty (2002)
- Frasch Award in Chemistry (2002)
- Dreyfus Teacher-Scholar Award (2003)
- Alfred P. Sloan Fellowship (2003)
- Johnson & Johnson Focused Giving Award (2005)
- Solvias Ligand Prize (2006)
- Presidential Green Chemistry Award (2007)
- ACS Corey Award (2007)
- Dowpharma Prize (2007)
- Tetrahedron Young Investigator Award (2009)
- Humboldt Senior Research Award (2009–2011)
- Mukaiyama Award (2010)
- Glaxo-Smith-Kline Scholar Award (2011)
- ACS Cope Scholar Award (2012)
- Japanese Society for the Promotion of Science Fellow (2013)
- Royal Society of Chemistry, Pedlar Award (2015)
- American Association for the Advancement of Science Fellow (2017)
- ACS Award for Creative Work in Synthetic Organic Chemistry (2020)
- Yamada-Koga Prize (2025)
- Palladium Global Science Award (2025)
- Akira Suzuki Award (2026)
