= Allyl acetate =

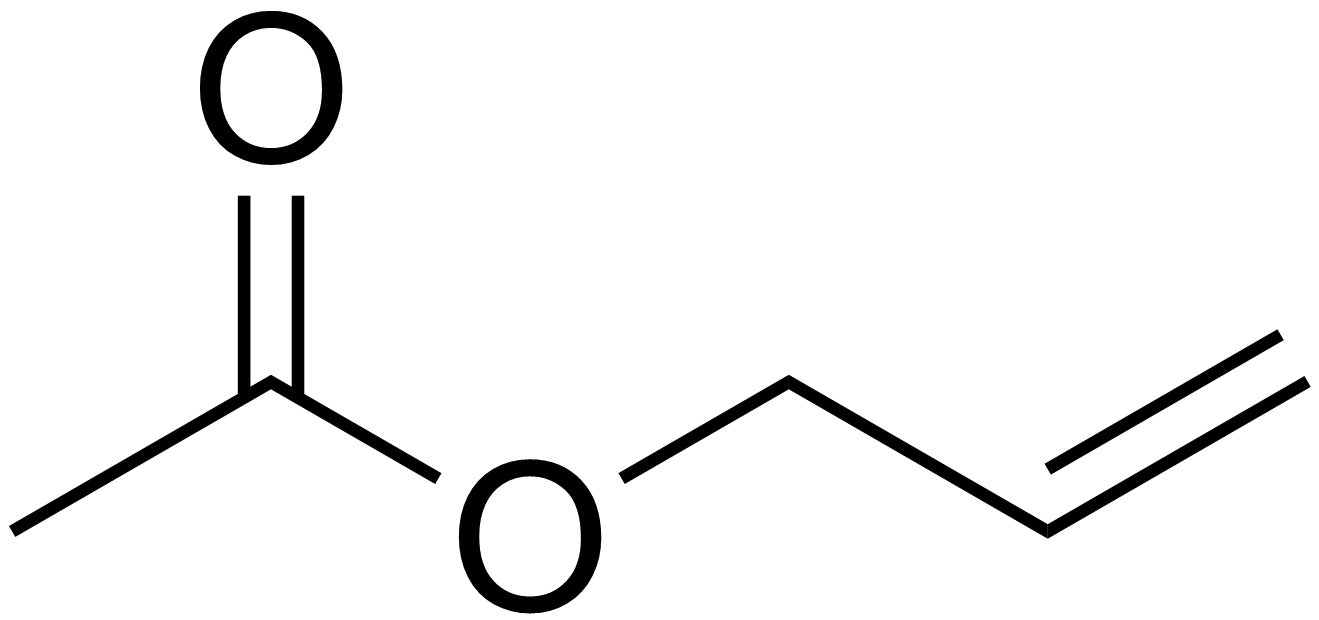

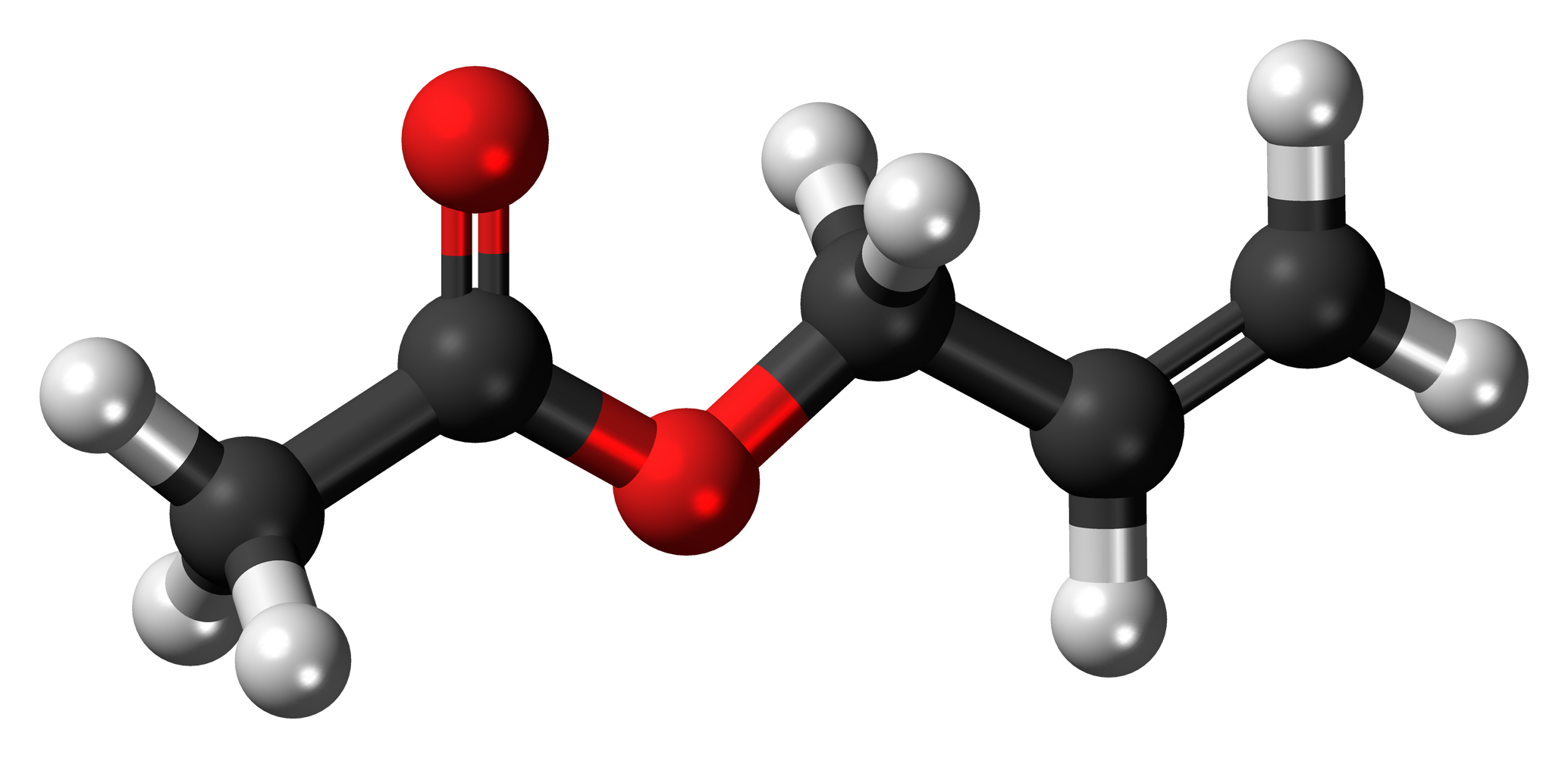

Names
- Preferred IUPAC name Prop-2-enyl acetate
- Other names 2-Propenyl acetate Allyl acetate

Identifiers
CAS Number	591-87-7
3D model (JSmol)	Interactive image
ChEMBL	ChEMBL1890774
ChemSpider	13862665
ECHA InfoCard	100.008.851
EC Number	209-734-8
PubChem CID	11584
RTECS number	AF1750000
UNII	E4U5E5990I
UN number	2333
CompTox Dashboard (EPA)	DTXSID9024437
- InChI: InChI=1S/C5H8O2/c1-3-4-7-5(2)6/h3H,1,4H2,2H3 Key: FWZUNOYOVVKUNF-UHFFFAOYSA-N
- SMILES: C=CCOC(C)=O

Properties
Chemical formula	C_{5}H_{8}O_{2}
Molar mass	100.117 g·mol^{−1}
Appearance	Colorless liquid
Density	0.928 g/cm^{3}
Boiling point	103 °C (217 °F; 376 K)
Solubility in water	slightly soluble
Magnetic susceptibility (χ)	−56.7·10^{−6} cm^{3}/mol

Hazards
- GHS labelling
Pictograms	(GHS02: Flammable) (GHS06: Toxic) (GHS07: Exclamation mark)
Signal word	Danger
Hazard statements	H225, H301, H312, H319, H330
Precautionary statements	P210, P233, P240, P241, P242, P243, P260, P264, P270, P271, P280, P284, P301+P310, P302+P352, P303+P361+P353, P304+P340, P305+P351+P338, P310, P312, P320, P321, P330, P337+P313, P363, P370+P378, P403+P233, P403+P235, P405, P501
Autoignition temperature	374 °C (705 °F; 647 K)
- Except where otherwise noted, data are given for materials in their standard state (at 25 °C [77 °F], 100 kPa). verify (what is ?) Infobox references

Allyl acetate is an organic compound with formula C_{3}H_{5}OC(O)CH_{3}. This colourless liquid is a precursor to especially allyl alcohol, which is a useful industrial intermediate. It is the acetate ester of allyl alcohol.

== Preparation ==
Allyl acetate is produced industrially by the gas phase reaction of propene in the presence of acetic acid using a palladium catalyst:

C_{3}H_{6} + CH_{3}COOH + ½ O_{2} → CH_{2}=CHCH_{2}OCOCH_{3} + H_{2}O

This method is advantageous because propene is inexpensive and a green chemical. Allyl alcohol is also produced primarily from allyl chloride, but production via the hydrolysis of allyl acetate route avoids the use of chlorine, and so is increasing in use.

Vinyl acetate is produced similarly, using ethylene in place of propene. These reactions are examples of acetoxylation. The palladium center is then re-oxidized by the O_{2} present. The mechanism for the acetoxylation follows a similar pathway, with propene forming a π-allyl bond on the palladium.

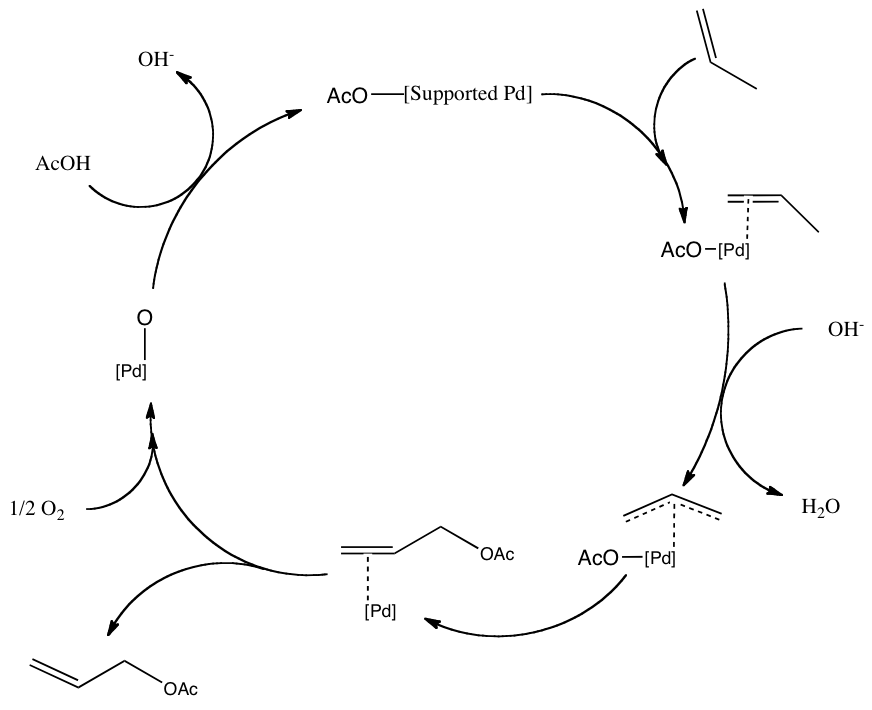
Catalytic cycle for the production of Allyl Acetate.

== Reactions and applications ==
Allyl acetate can be hydrolyzed to allyl alcohol:

CH_{2}=CHCH_{2}OCOCH_{3} + H_{2}O → CH_{2}=CHCH_{2}OH + CH_{3}COOH

Allyl alcohol is a precursor for some specialty polymers, mainly for drying oils. Allyl alcohol is also a precursor to synthetic glycerol. Epoxidation by hydrogen peroxide produces glycidol, which undergoes hydrolysis to glycerol.

CH_{2}=CHCH_{2}OH + HOOH → CH_{2}OCHCH_{2}OH + H_{2}O
CH_{2}OCHCH_{2}OH + H_{2}O → C_{3}H_{5}(OH)_{3}

Synthetic glycerol tends to be used in cosmetics and toiletries whereas glycerol from the hydrolysis of fats is used in food.

=== Substitution reactions ===
Substitution of the acetate group in allyl acetate using hydrogen chloride yields allyl chloride. Reaction with hydrogen cyanide over copper catalyst yields allyl cyanide.

CH_{2}=CHCH_{2}OCOCH_{3} + HCl → CH_{2}=CHCH_{2}Cl + CH_{3}COOH
CH_{2}=CHCH_{2}OCOCH_{3} + HCN → CH_{2}=CHCH_{2}CN + CH_{3}COOH

Allyl chloride is generally produced directly by the chlorination of propene.
