= Allyltrimethylsilane =

Organosilicon compound

Names
- IUPAC name trimethyl(prop-2-en-1-yl)silane
- Other names allyl trimethylsilane

Identifiers
CAS Number	762-72-1
3D model (JSmol)	Interactive image
ChemSpider	63007
ECHA InfoCard	100.011.003
EC Number	212-104-5
PubChem CID	69808
UNII	8B84C337VF
CompTox Dashboard (EPA)	DTXSID5061089
- InChI: InChI=1S/C6H14Si/c1-5-6-7(2,3)4/h5H,1,6H2,2-4H3 Key: HYWCXWRMUZYRPH-UHFFFAOYSA-N
- SMILES: C[Si](C)(C)CC=C

Properties
Chemical formula	C_{6}H_{14}Si
Molar mass	114.263 g·mol^{−1}
Appearance	colorless liquid
Density	0.719 g/cm^{3}
Boiling point	84–88 °C (183–190 °F; 357–361 K)

Hazards
- GHS labelling
Pictograms	(GHS02: Flammable) (GHS07: Exclamation mark)
Signal word	Warning
Hazard statements	H225, H315, H319, H335
Precautionary statements	P210, P233, P240, P241, P242, P243, P261, P264, P264+P265, P271, P280, P302+P352, P303+P361+P353, P304+P340, P305+P351+P338, P319, P321, P332+P317, P337+P317, P362+P364, P370+P378, P403+P233, P403+P235, P405, P501
- Except where otherwise noted, data are given for materials in their standard state (at 25 °C [77 °F], 100 kPa). Infobox references

Allyltrimethylsilane is the organosilicon compound with the formula (CH_{3})_{3}SiCH_{2}CH=CH_{2}. The molecule consists of the trimethylsilyl group attached to allyl group. This colorless liquid is used in organic synthesis.
