= BINAP =

Names
- Preferred IUPAC name ([1,1′-Binaphthalene]-2,2′-diyl)bis(diphenylphosphane)
- Other names BINAP

Identifiers
CAS Number	76189-55-4 (R); 76189-56-5 (S)
3D model (JSmol)	(Rac): Interactive image
ChEMBL	ChEMBL1275990
ChemSpider	551072 (Rac)
ECHA InfoCard	100.114.880
EC Number	616-304-7 619-338-0 616-305-2 918-620-3
PubChem CID	634876 (+)
UNII	4F1X2F8NA3 (R); OX12238KWH (S)
CompTox Dashboard (EPA)	DTXSID40913327
- InChI: InChI=1S/C44H32P2/c1-5-19-35(20-6-1)45(36-21-7-2-8-22-36)41-31-29-33-17-13-15-27-39(33)43(41)44-40-28-16-14-18-34(40)30-32-42(44)46(37-23-9-3-10-24-37)38-25-11-4-12-26-38/h1-32H Key: MUALRAIOVNYAIW-UHFFFAOYSA-N
- SMILES: (Rac): c1ccc(cc1)P(c2ccccc2)c3ccc4ccccc4c3c5c6ccccc6ccc5P(c7ccccc7)c8ccccc8

Properties
Chemical formula	C_{44}H_{32}P_{2}
Molar mass	622.688 g·mol^{−1}
Appearance	Colorless solid
Melting point	239 to 241 °C (462 to 466 °F; 512 to 514 K) (R); 238–240 °C (S)
Solubility in water	organic solvents

Hazards
- GHS labelling
Pictograms	(GHS07: Exclamation mark)
Signal word	Warning
Hazard statements	H315, H319, H335, H413
Precautionary statements	P261, P264, P271, P273, P280, P302+P352, P304+P340, P305+P351+P338, P312, P321, P332+P313, P337+P313, P362, P403+P233, P405, P501
- Except where otherwise noted, data are given for materials in their standard state (at 25 °C [77 °F], 100 kPa). verify (what is ?) Infobox references

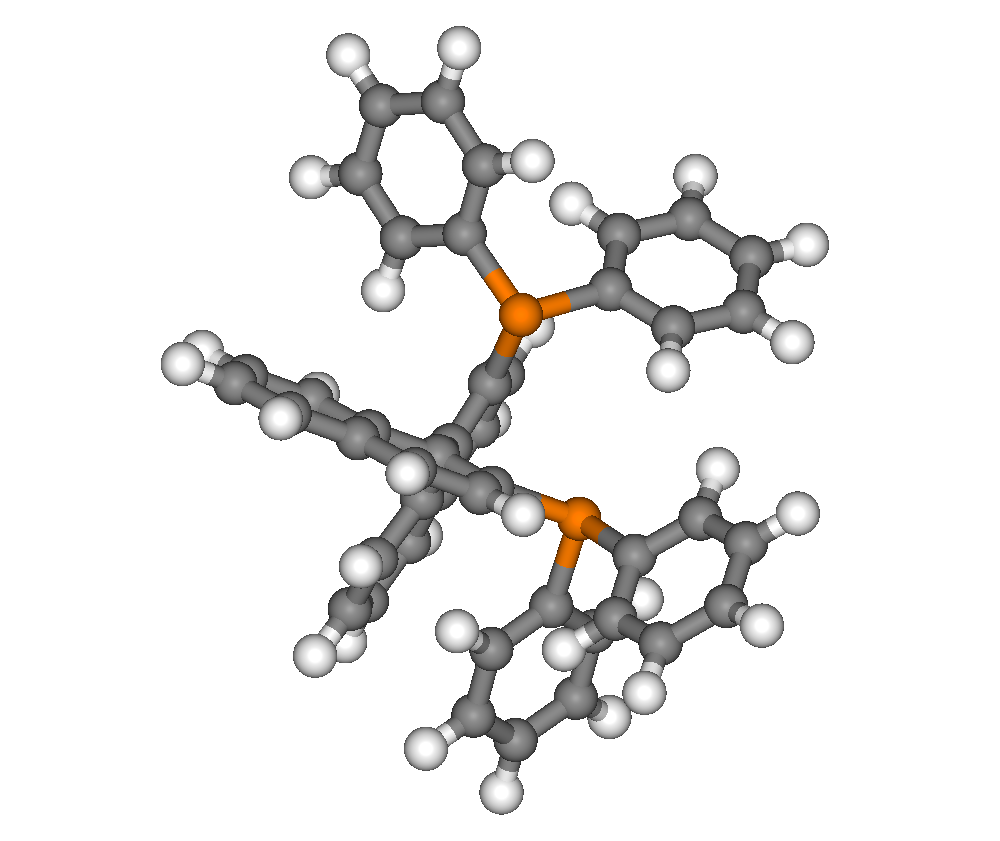
Ball and stick model of BINAP viewed as above

BINAP (2,2′-bis(diphenylphosphino)-1,1′-binaphthyl) is an organophosphorus compound. This chiral diphosphine ligand is widely used in asymmetric synthesis. It consists of a pair of 2-diphenylphosphinonaphthyl groups linked at the 1 and 1′ positions. This C_{2}-symmetric framework lacks a stereogenic atom, but has axial chirality due to restricted rotation (atropisomerism). The barrier to racemization is high due to steric hindrance, which limits rotation about the bond linking the naphthyl rings. The dihedral angle between the naphthyl groups is approximately 90°. The natural bite angle is 93°.

== Use as ligand in asymmetric catalysis ==
BINAP is used in organic synthesis for enantioselective transformations catalyzed by its complexes of ruthenium, rhodium, and palladium. As pioneered by Ryōji Noyori and his co-workers, rhodium complexes of BINAP are useful for the synthesis of (–)-menthol.

Silver complexes are also important; BINAP-AgF can be used to enantioselectively protonate silyl enol ethers.

Subsequent studies revealed that related diphosphines with a narrower dihedral angle between the aromatic faces give catalysts that are more enantioselective. One such ligand is SEGPHOS.

== Preparation ==
BINAP is prepared from BINOL via its bistriflate derivatives. Both the (R)- and (S)-enantiomers, as well as the racemate, are commercially available. One of the wide applications include chemoselective hydrogenation, where BINAP is conjugated to rhodium.
