= C9H12 =

The molecular formula C_{9}H_{12} may refer to:

- C3-Benzenes
  - Propylbenzenes
    - Cumene
    - n-Propylbenzene
  - Ethyltoluenes
    - 2-Ethyltoluene
    - 3-Ethyltoluene
    - 4-Ethyltoluene
  - Trimethylbenzenes
    - 1,2,3-Trimethylbenzene
    - 1,2,4-Trimethylbenzene
    - Mesitylene (1,3,5-trimethylbenzene)
- Ethylidene norbornene
- Tetravinylmethane
- Vinyl norbornene
