= C3-Benzenes =

The C_{3}-benzenes are a class of organic aromatic compounds which contain a benzene ring and three other carbon atoms. For the hydrocarbons with no further unsaturation or cycles, there are four isomers. The chemical formula for all the saturated isomers is C_{9}H_{12}. There are three trimethylbenzenes, three ethylmethylbenzenes, and two propylbenzene isomers. 1980s American gasoline contained about 3-4% C_{3}-benzenes.

== Trimethylbenzenes ==
- Hemellitene
- Pseudocumene
- Mesitylene

== Other ==
=== Saturated ===
- 1-Ethyl-2-methylbenzene
- 1-Ethyl-3-methylbenzene
- 1-Ethyl-4-methylbenzene
- Cumene
- n-Propylbenzene
- Cyclopropylbenzene

=== Unsaturated ===
- trans-Propenylbenzene
- cis-Propenylbenzene
- Allylbenzene
- 2-Vinyltoluene
- 3-Vinyltoluene
- 4-Vinyltoluene
- α-Methylstyrene
- 1-propynylbenzene
- 2-propynylbenzene

== Gallery ==
1,2,3-Trimethylbenzene or Hemellitene

1,2,4-Trimethylbenzene or Pseudocumene

1,3,5-Trimethylbenzene or Mesitylene

1-Ethyl-2-methylbenzene

1-Ethyl-3-methylbenzene

1-Ethyl-4-methylbenzene

Cumene

n-Propylbenzene

Cyclopropylbenzene

trans-Propenylbenzene

cis-Propenylbenzene

Allylbenzene

2-Vinyltoluene or 2-Methylstyrene

3-Vinyltoluene or 3-Methylstyrene

4-Vinyltoluene

α-Methylstyrene

1-Propynylbenzene

2-Propynylbenzene
