= Methylstyrene =

Methylstyrene may refer to the following isomers of C_{9}H_{10} (molar mass 118.179 g/mol):

- α-Methylstyrene
- trans-Propenylbenzene (trans-β-methylstyrene)
- 4-Vinyltoluene (4-methylstyrene)

== See also ==
- Styrene
