= C10H12O =

The molecular formula C_{10}H_{12}O (molar mass: 148.2 g/mol, exact mass: 148.0888 u) may refer to:

- Anethole
- Benzylacetone
- Butyrophenone
- Cuminaldehyde, or 4-isopropylbenzaldehyde
- Estragole
- Mesitaldehyde
