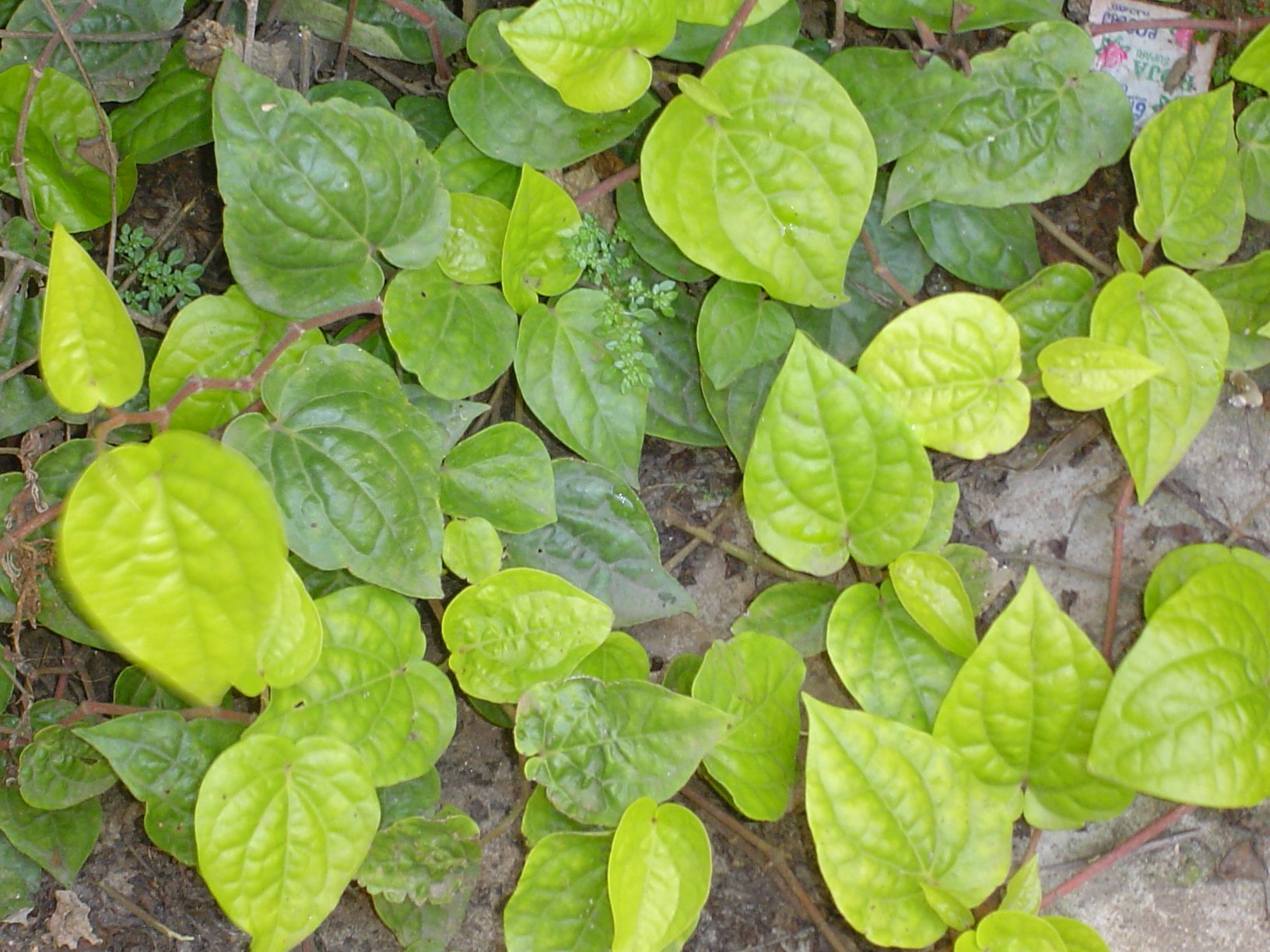

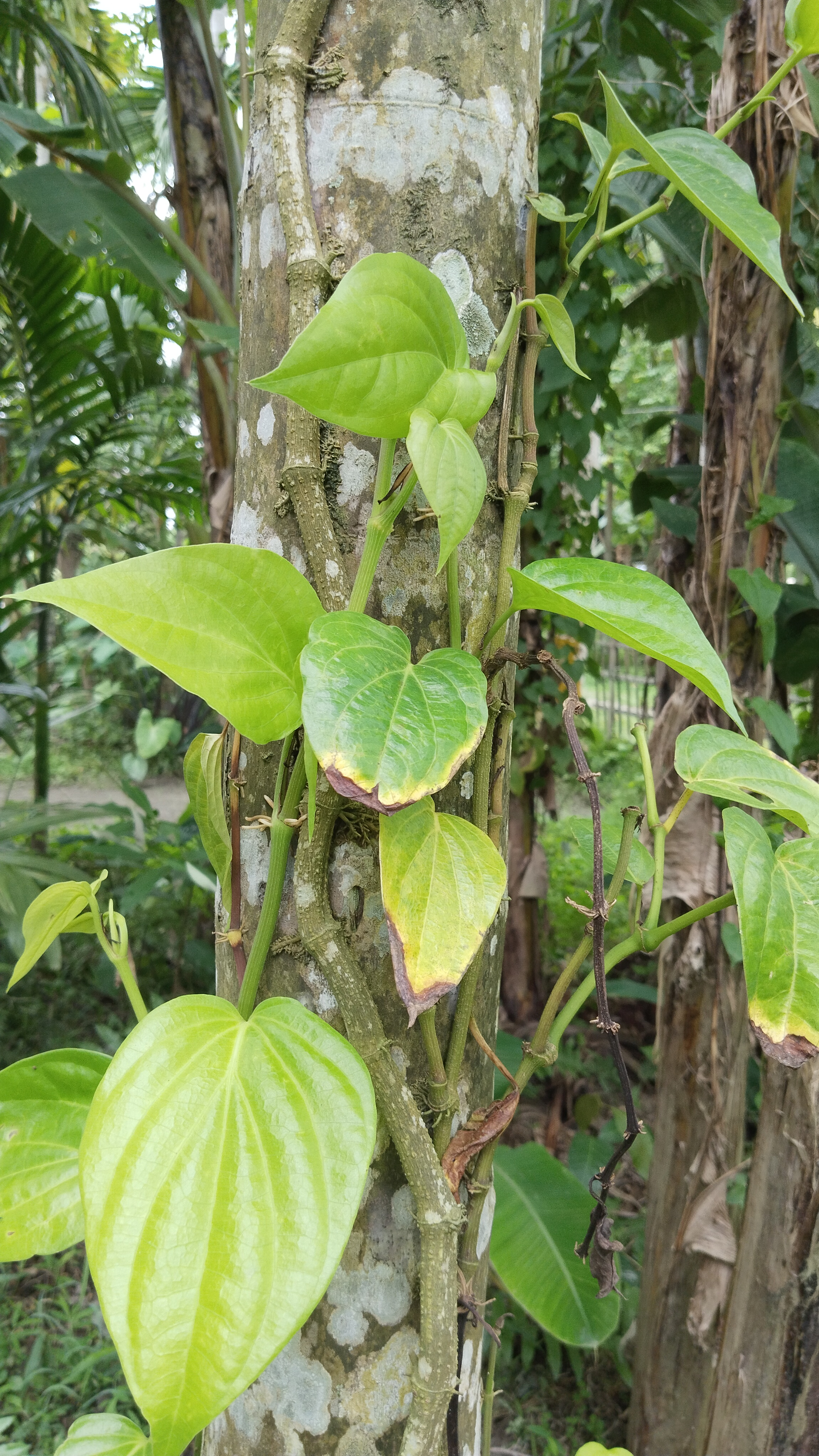

Scientific classification
- Kingdom: Plantae
- Clade: Tracheophytes
- Clade: Angiosperms
- Clade: Magnoliids
- Order: Piperales
- Family: Piperaceae
- Genus: Piper
- Species: P. betle

Binomial name
- Piper betle L.

= Betel =

Species of plant

Betel (Piper betle) is a species of flowering plant in the pepper family Piperaceae, native to Southeast Asia. It is an evergreen, dioecious vine, with glossy heart-shaped leaves and white catkins. Betel plants are cultivated for their leaves, which are most commonly used as flavouring for chewing with areca nut in so-called betel quid (often confusingly referred to as "betel nut"), which is carcinogenic, contains a psychostimulant drug, and is associated with a wide range of serious health conditions.

== Etymology ==
The term betel was derived from the Malayalam/Tamil word vettila via Portuguese.

== Distribution ==
Piper betle is originally native to Southeast Asia, from India, Philippines, Timor-Leste and Indonesia and Peninsular Malaysia to Indochina, Vietnam, Cambodia, Laos, Thailand, Myanmar, and Bangladesh. Its cultivation has spread along with the Austronesian migrations and trade to other parts of Island Southeast Asia, Papua New Guinea and Melanesia, Micronesia, South Asia, the Maldives, Mauritius, Réunion Island, and Madagascar. It was introduced during the Colonial Era to the Caribbean by Indian indentured immigrants.

== Cultivation ==
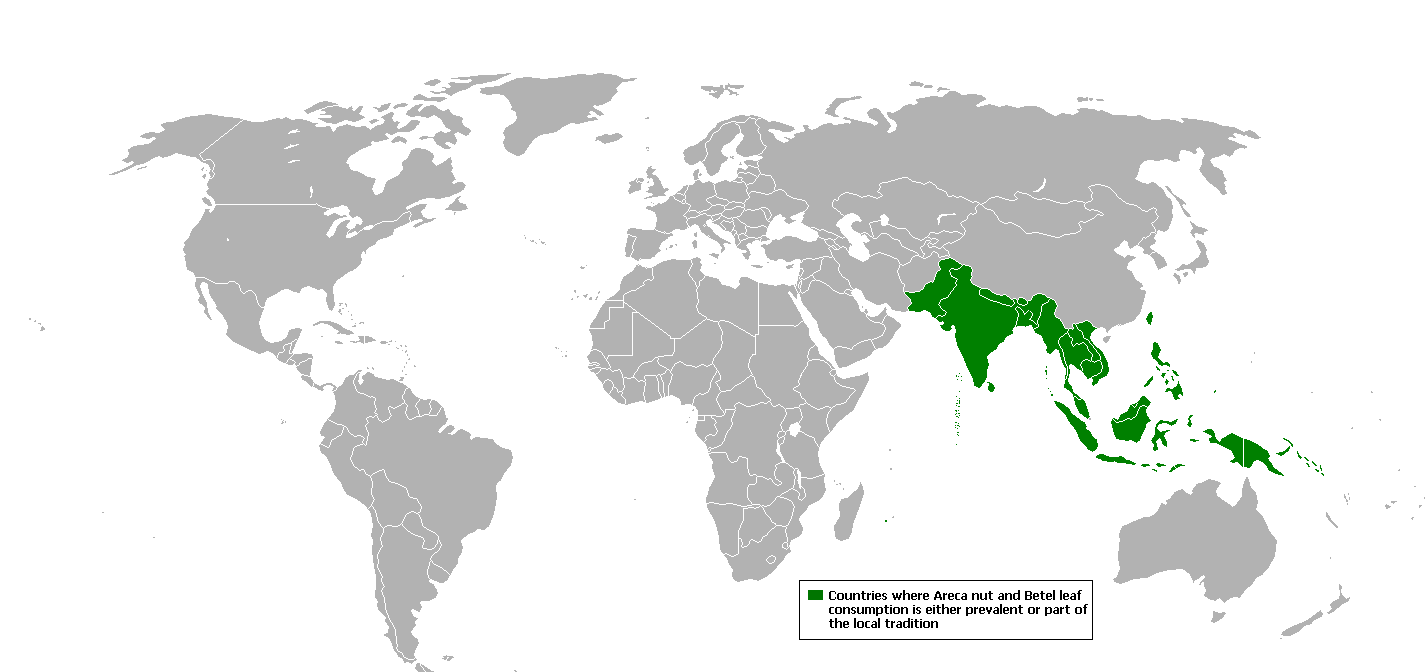
Betel leaf and Areca nut consumption in the world

The betel leaf is cultivated mostly in South and Southeast Asia, from India to Papua New Guinea. It needs a compatible tree or a long pole for support. Betel requires well-drained fertile soil. Waterlogged, saline and alkali soils are unsuitable for its cultivation.

A farmer from Kasaragod explains in Tulu that betel leaves are very useful and have a wide range of applications. He says that they are traditionally used in medicine and for various other purposes.

In Bangladesh, farmers called barui prepare a garden fenced with bamboo sticks and coconut leaves called a barouj in which betel would be optimally grown. The soil is plowed into furrows of 10 to 15 m length, 75 cm in width, and 75 cm depth. Oil cakes, manure, and leaves are thoroughly incorporated with the topsoil of the furrows and wood ash. The cuttings are planted at the beginning of the monsoon season.

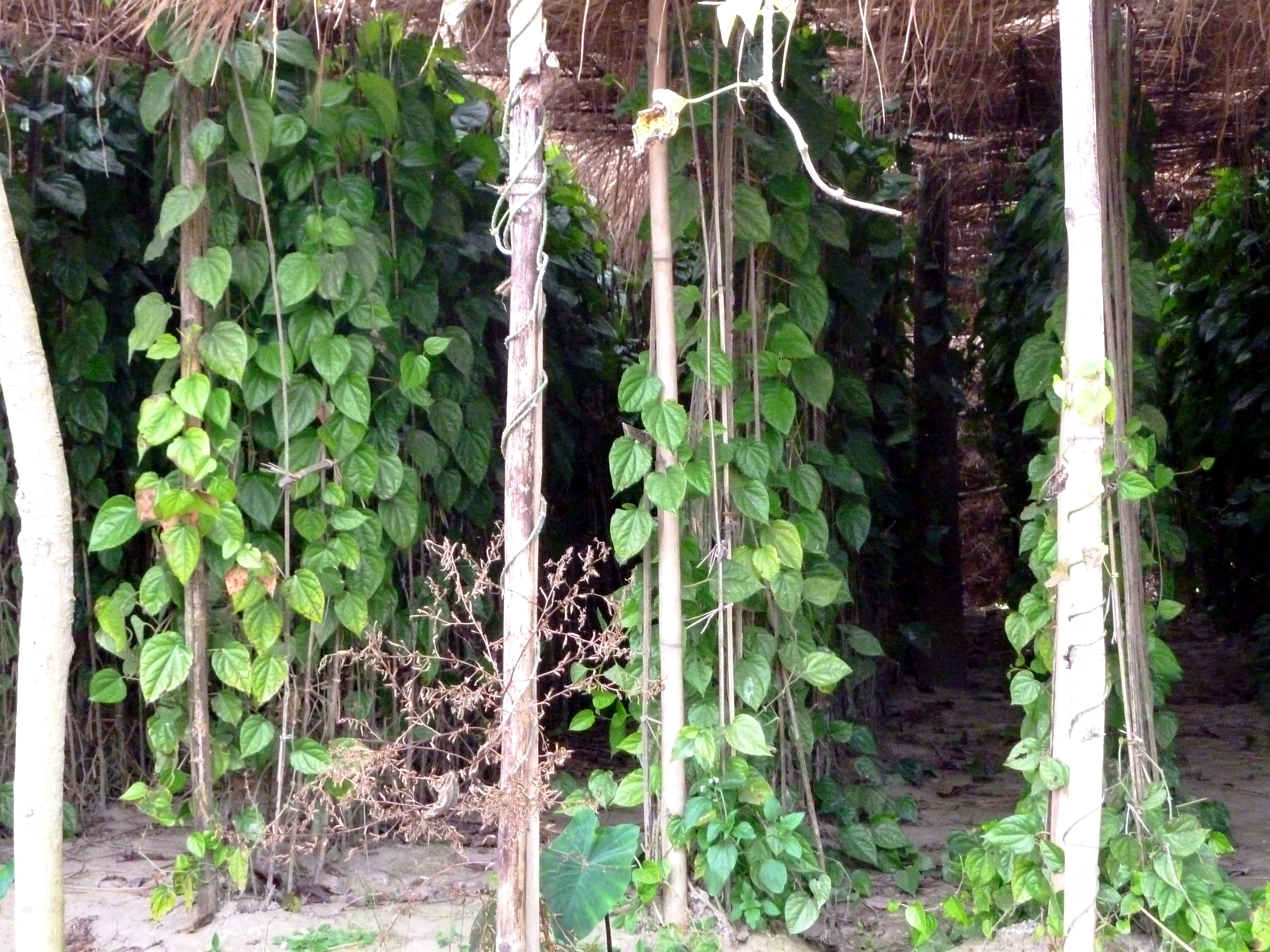
Betel plant cultivation in Bangladesh

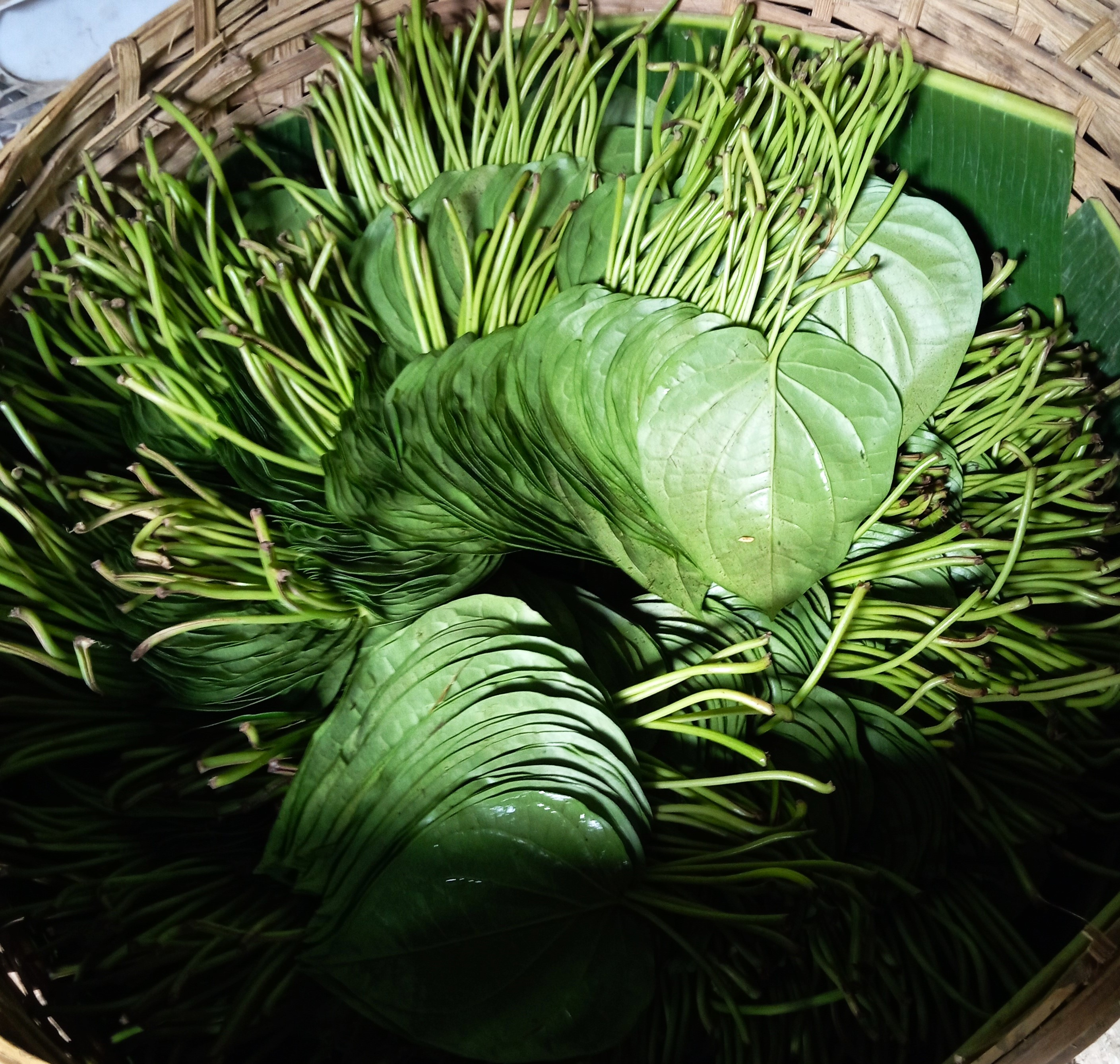
Betel leaves in Kolkata market, West Bengal, India

Proper shade and irrigation are essential for the successful cultivation of this crop. Betel needs constantly moist soil, but there should not be excessive moisture. Irrigation is frequent and light, and standing water should not remain for more than half an hour.

Dried leaves and wood ash are applied to the furrows at fortnightly intervals and cow dung slurry is sprinkled. Application of different kinds of leaves at monthly intervals is believed advantageous for the growth of the betel. In three to six months, the vines reach 150 to 180 cm (59 to 71 in) in height, and they will branch. Harvest begins with the farmer plucking the leaf and its petiole with his right thumb. The harvest lasts 15 days to one month. The betel plant has made its way to research labs of many Bangladesh chemical and food nutrition companies.

The harvested leaves are consumed locally and exported to other parts of Asia, the Middle East, Europe, and the Americas. Betel is grown and cultivated as an important crop in rural Bangladesh.

== Cultural significance ==
The primary use of betel leaf is as a wrapper for the chewing of areca nut, or in modern times, tobacco, where it is mainly used to add flavour. The practice is thought to have originated in the Philippines around 5,000 years ago, where the oldest remains of areca nuts and calcium from crushed sea shells have been found in the Duyong Cave archaeological site. It spread along with the Austronesian migrations to the rest of Southeast Asia, Taiwan, South China, and South Asia. It is unknown when or why betel leaves were first combined with areca nuts, since areca nuts can be chewed alone.

While the practice of chewing betel leaf existed even before the common era, with attested references from at least the 3rd century CE, the ingredient mix (paan/betel quid) it was chewed with changed over time. Areca nut, calcium hydroxide and catechu were the historic ingredients, as referenced in texts from 9th century CE. Tobacco started to feature in the 20th century. The practice of chewing betel leaf is on the decline, and now a quid consisting of tobacco, areca nut, and limewater, known as gutka, is more popular.

In India and Sri Lanka, a sheaf of betel leaves is traditionally offered as a mark of respect and auspicious beginnings. Occasions include greeting elders at wedding ceremonies, celebrating the New Year, and offering payment to physicians and astrologers, to whom money and/or areca nut, placed on top of the sheaf of leaves, are offered in thanks for blessings. In Bengali weddings, the bride is brought to the groom, seated on a platform and her face covered in betel leaves.

In Papua New Guinea and the Solomon Islands, the inflorescence stalk of the betel tree, known as daka or "mustard stick", is consumed together with the leaves.

It may also be used in cooking, usually raw, for its peppery taste. Use of binlang, or betel, has over a 300-year history in areas of China, where it was once promoted for medicinal use.

== Health effects ==
Red betel leaf is sometimes used as an antibacterial mouthwash. While chewing or consuming betel leaf on its own has no known negative effect and have been shown to be chemopreventive in animal models, it is most often used to wrap betel quid for chewing, which also contains the carcinogenic and mildly narcotic areca nut. Habitual use of this popular product (sometimes inaccurately referred to as "betel nut") damages the oral cavity and is associated with a wide range of adverse systemic health effects, including harm to the cardiovascular and central nervous systems. Chewing paan (betel quid) is strongly associated with a higher risk of developing head and neck cancer, as well as oropharyngeal squamous cell carcinoma (OPSCC), a form of cancer that affects the mouth, tonsils, and throat. Multiple studies demonstrate that betel quid without added tobacco also causes esophageal cancer, and in some instances, liver cancer. Betel quid chewing can also cause stillbirth, premature birth, and low birth weight.

The International Agency for Research on Cancer (IARC) and the World Health Organization (WHO) accept the scientific evidence that chewing tobacco and areca nut is carcinogenic to humans. As with chewing tobacco, chewing betel quid is discouraged by preventive healthcare efforts. While various scales exist to measure betel quid dependency, more comprehensive and validated tools are needed to assess this dependency effectively across different populations.

== Chemical composition ==
Chemistry of betel leaf varies geographically and is mostly chavibetol dominant. Safrole is a major component of Sri Lankan Piper betle. Eugenol, isoeugenol, and germacrene D are other dominant compounds in other chemotypes.

Leaves also contain eugenol, chavicol, hydroxychavicol, and caryophyllene.

Stems contain phytosterols (β-sitosterol, β-daucosterol, stigmasterol etc.), alkaloids (piperine, pellitorine, piperdardine, guineensine etc.), lignan (pinoresinol) and other components. Some of them are oleanolic acid, dehydropipernonaline, piperolein-B, bornyl cis-4-hydroxycinnamate, and bornyl p-coumarate.

Roots contain aristololactam A-II, a phenylpropene, 4-allyl resorcinol, and a diketosteroid stigmast-4-en-3,6-dione.

Its essential oil consists of 50 different compounds, of which major components are eugenol, caryophyllene, terpinolene, terpinene, cadinene, and 3-carene.

== Genome ==
The whole genome of Piper Betle has been available since 2023 on NCBI with the Accession number JAURVB000000000.

== Economics ==
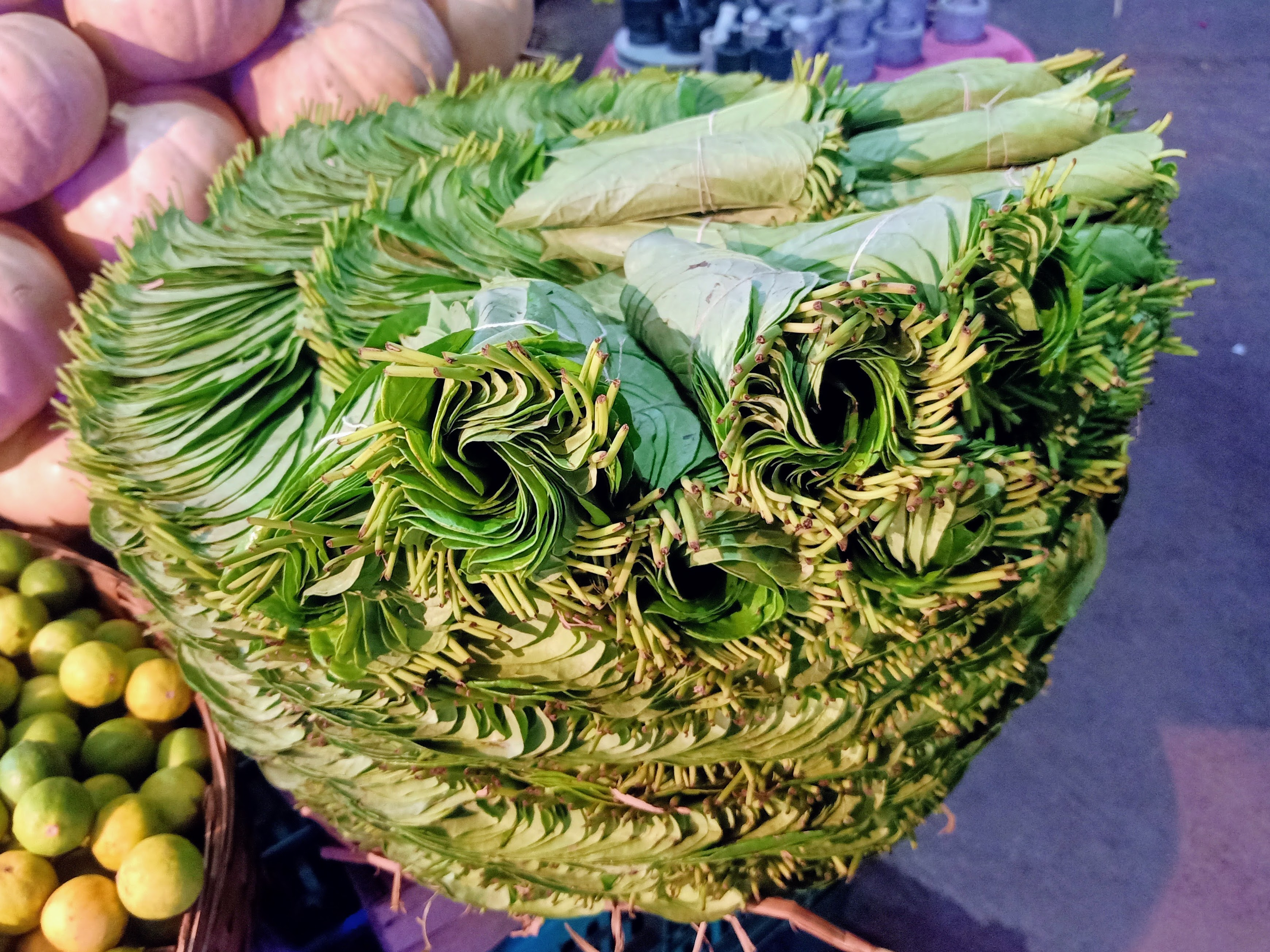
Betel leaves for selling in the market

A farmer from Kasaragod explains in Tulu that betel leaves are traditionally tied together into a small bundle, locally known as “Bacchire Soodi,” meaning a packet or bundle of betel leaves.

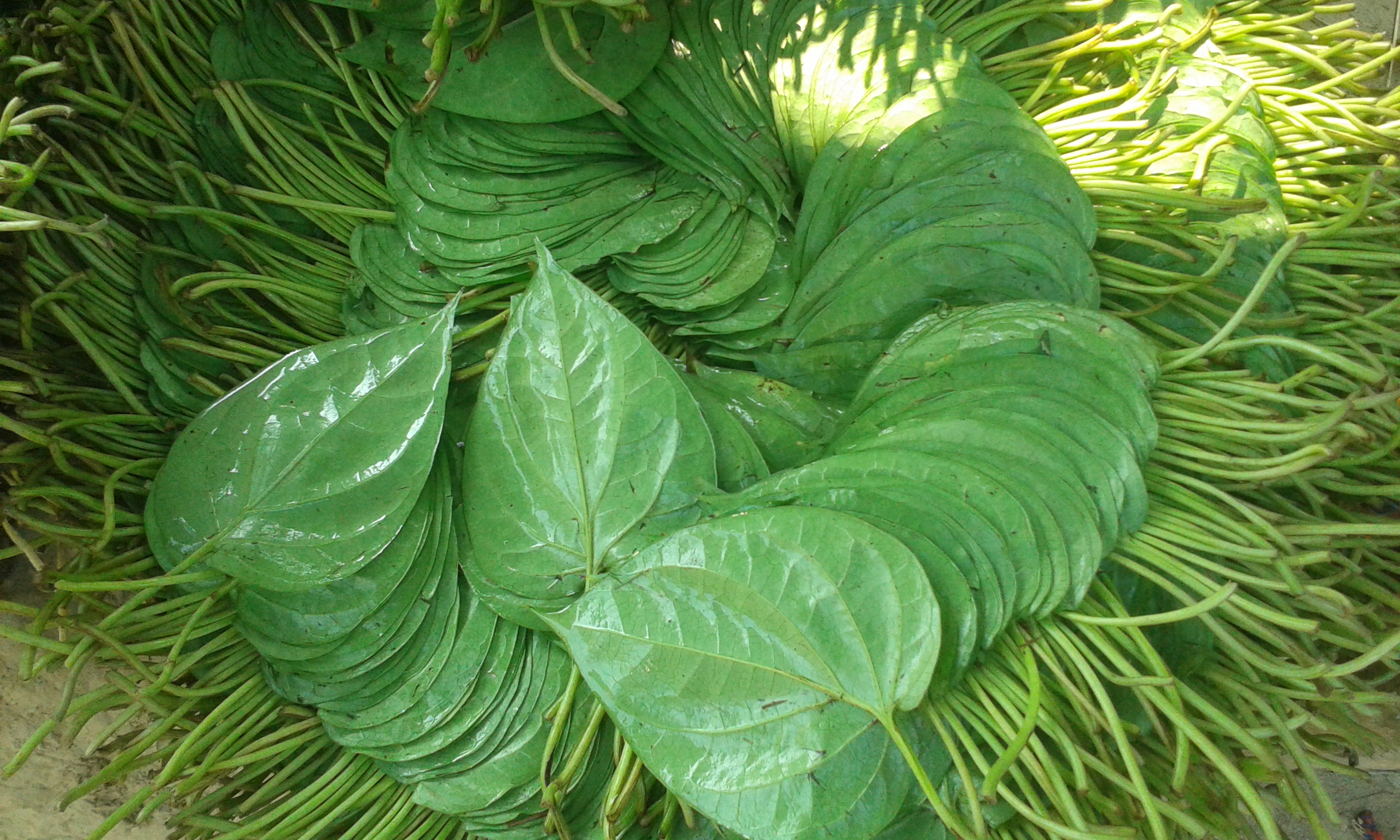
Betel in Bangladesh

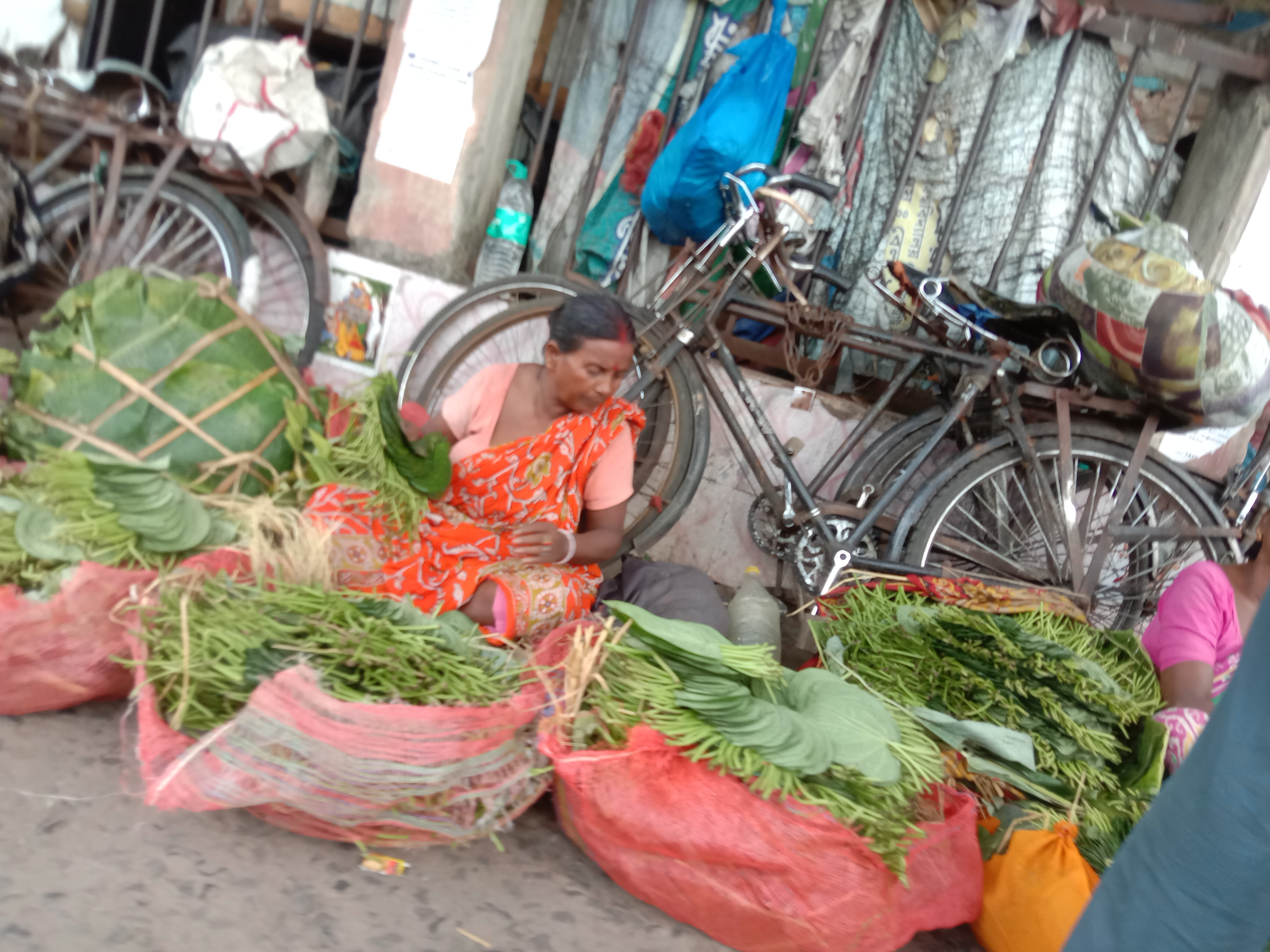
A Bengali woman selling betel leaves in Howrah

Betel vines are cultivated throughout southeast Asia, in plots typically 20 to 2,000 square metres (0.005-0.5 acre) in size.

Malaysian farmers cultivate four types of betel plants: sirih India, sirih Melayu, sirih Cina and sirih Udang. The harvest is then sold in bundles of leaves, each bundle costing in 2011 between MYR 0.30 and 0.50 (US$0.07-0.12).

In Sri Lanka, betel is grown all over the country. Commercial production of betel, with bigger leaves with dark green colour combined with thickness, known as "kalu bulath", is confined to a few districts, such as Kurunagala, Gampaha, Kegalle, Kalutara, and Colombo. These are sold at a wholesaler in lots of 1,000 leaves. According to a report published by the United Nations Food and Agriculture Organization (FAO), a successful betel farm in Sri Lanka can provide a supplemental income to a farmer by providing six days of work every six months and net income when the leaf prices are attractive.

The FAO study found the successful farm's yield to be 18,000 leaves per 14 m^{2} (150 sq ft). The additional salary and income to the Sri Lankan betel grower, assuming he or she provides all needed labor and keeps all net profit, is SL Rs. 1635 per 14 m^{2} (150 sq ft) of betel farm every 6 months. If the farmer hires outside labor to tend the betel vines and harvest the crop, the net income to the betel farm owner was SL Rs. 735 per 14 m^{2} (150 sq ft) of betel farm every 6 months. The market prices for betel leaves vary with the wet and dry seasons in Sri Lanka, and in 2010 averaged SL Rs. 200–400 per 1,000 leaves (US$1.82-3.64 per 1000 leaves). The FAO study assumes no losses from erratic weather and no losses during storage and transportation of perishable betel leaves. These losses are usually between 35% and 70%.

In Bangladesh, betel leaf farming yields vary by region and vine variety. In one region where betel leaf cultivation is the main source of income for farmers, a total of 2,825 hectares of land is dedicated to betel vine farming. The average production costs for these betel farms in Bangladesh are about Tk 300,000 per ha (US$4,000 per ha). The farm owners can earn a profit of over Tk 100,000 per ha (US$1,334 per ha).

In India, a 2006 research reported betel vines being cultivated on about 55,000 ha of farmland, with an annual production worth of about IN Rs. 9000 million (US$200 M). The betel farming industry, the report claims, supports about 400,000 – 500,000 agricultural families.

A March 2011 report claims that betel farming is on a decline in India. While in ideal conditions, some farms may gross annual incomes after expenses of over IN Rs. 650,000 per ha farm (US$14,300 per ha), a betel farm's income is highly erratic from year to year, due to varying rainfall patterns, temperature, and spoilage rates of 35% to 70% during transport over poor infrastructure. Simultaneously, the demand for betel leaves has been dropping in India due to acceptance of gutkha (chewing tobacco) by consumers over betel leaf-based ‘‘paan’’ preparation. The report cites betel leaf trading has dropped by 65% from 2000 to 2010 and created an oversupply. As a result, the report claims Indian farmers do not find betel farming lucrative anymore.

== Gallery ==
cultivation using 'Paan Baraj' (Bangla: পান বরজ) method
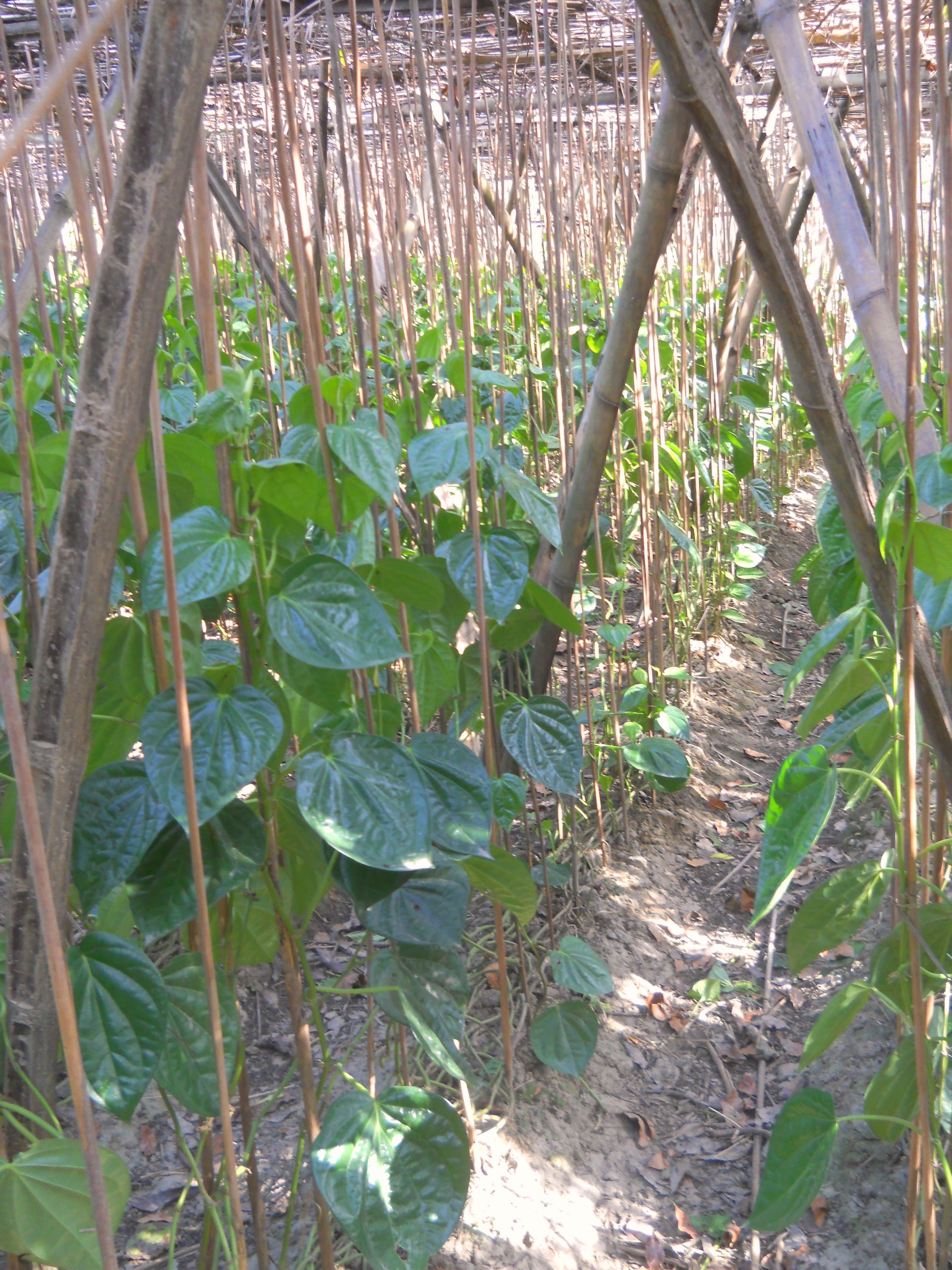
Paan 'Baraj interior, Howrah district, West Bengal India

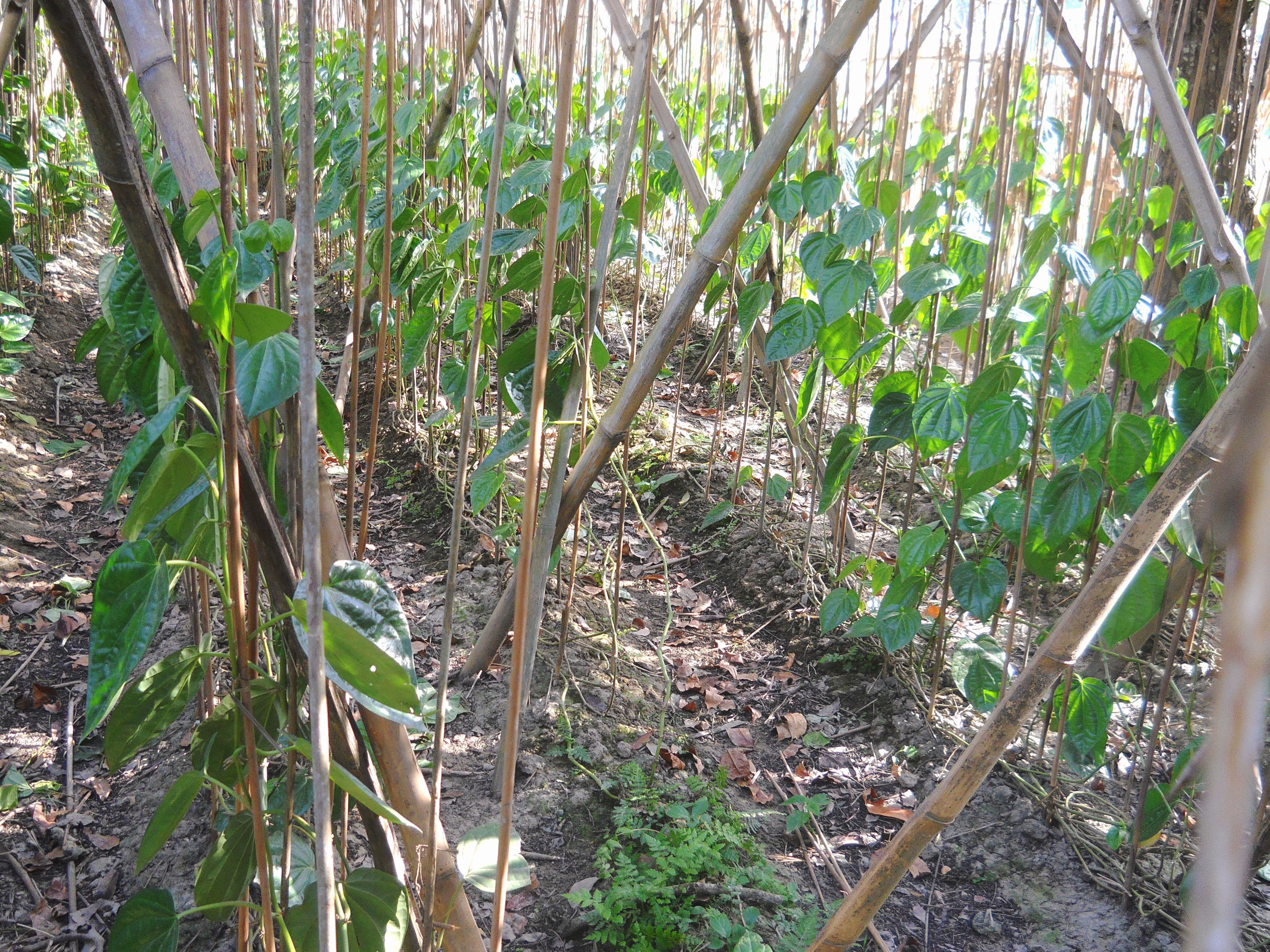
Paan 'Baraj interior, Howrah district, West Bengal India

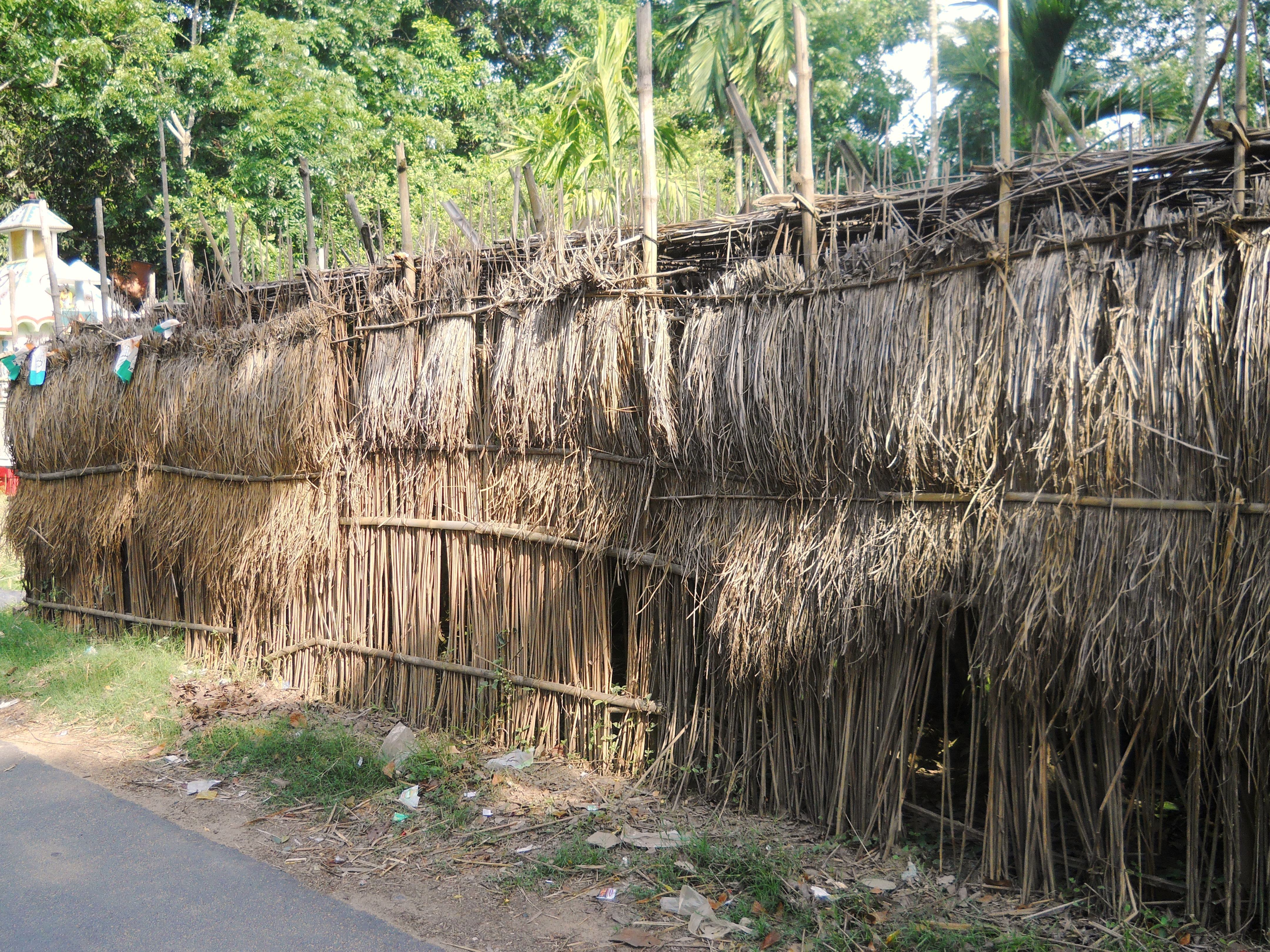
A 'Paan Baraj' exterior, photo taken at Howrah District West Bengal India
Objects and Historical Representation
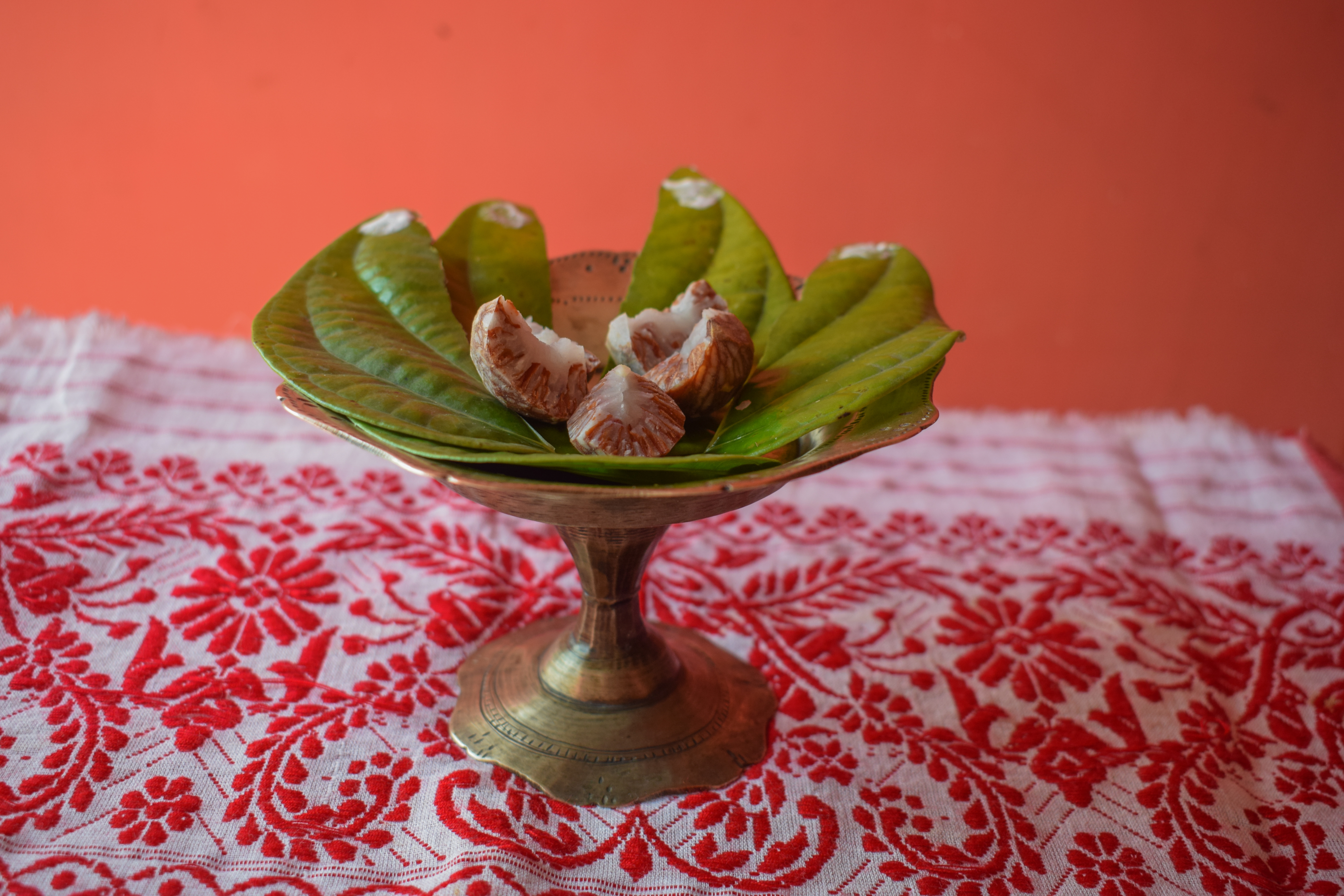
Assamese 'Paan-Tamul' tradition

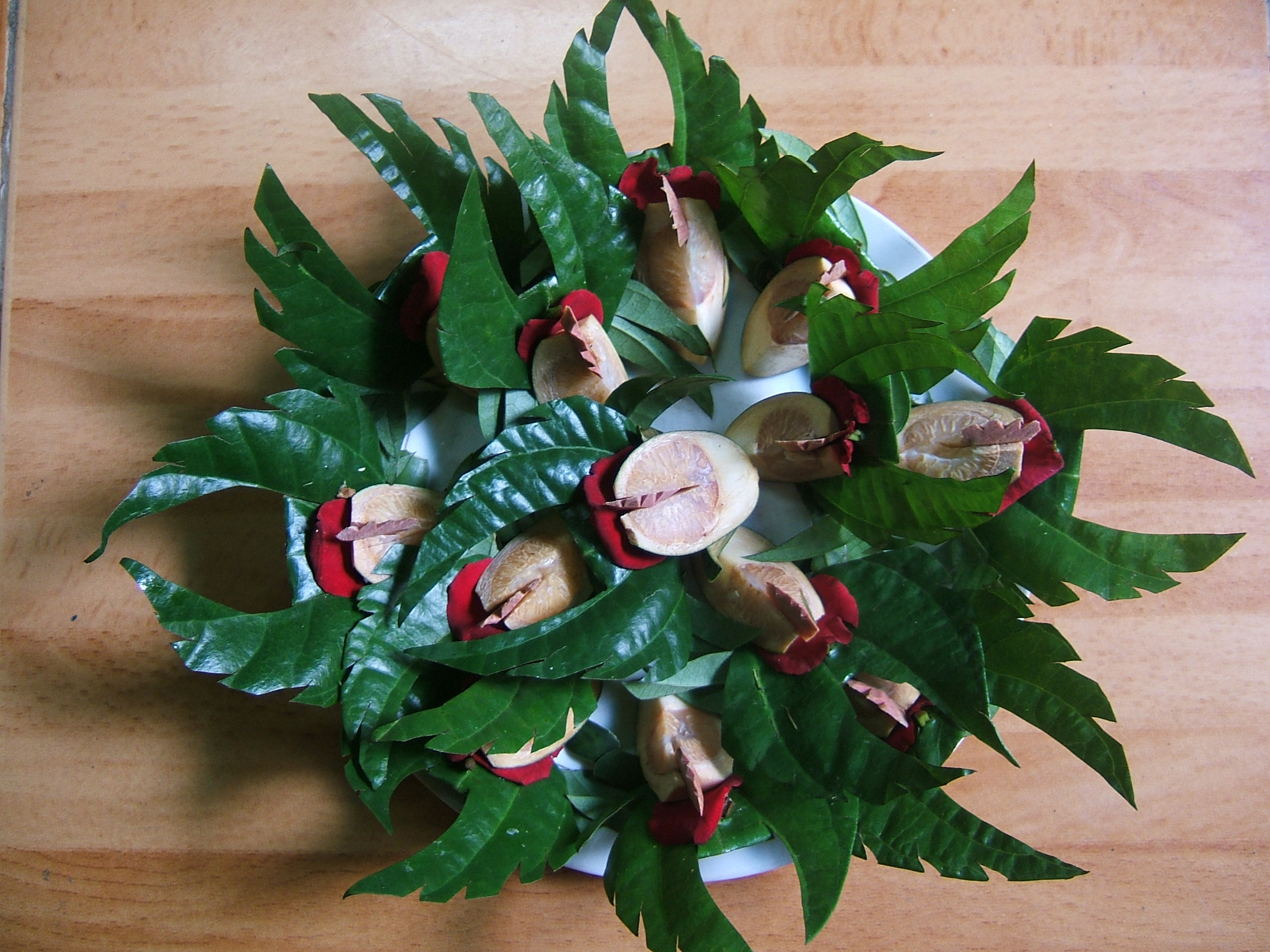
A Phoenix wing-shaped betel leaf plate in Vietnam

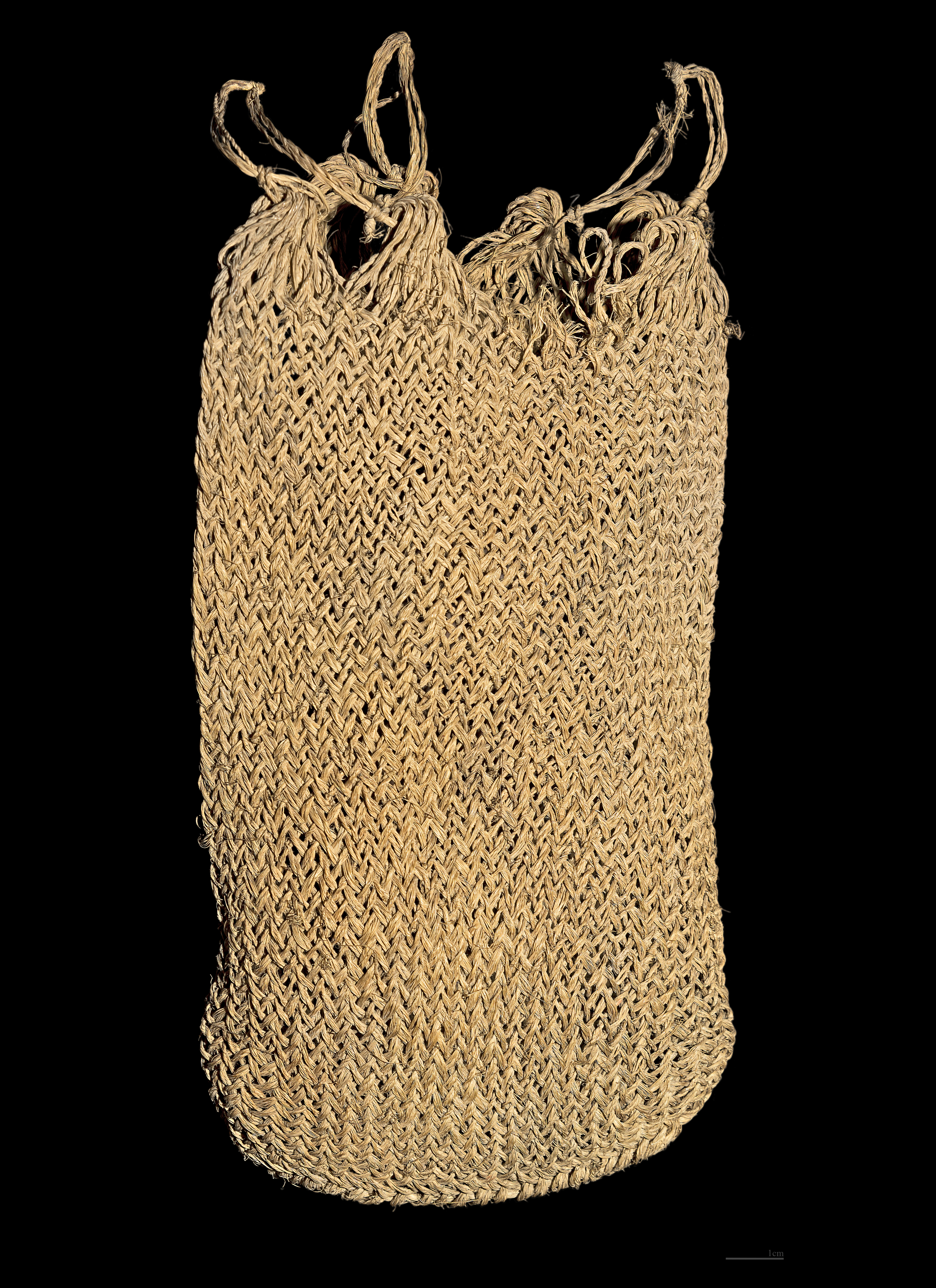
Betel bag, New Guinea, nineteenth century MHNT

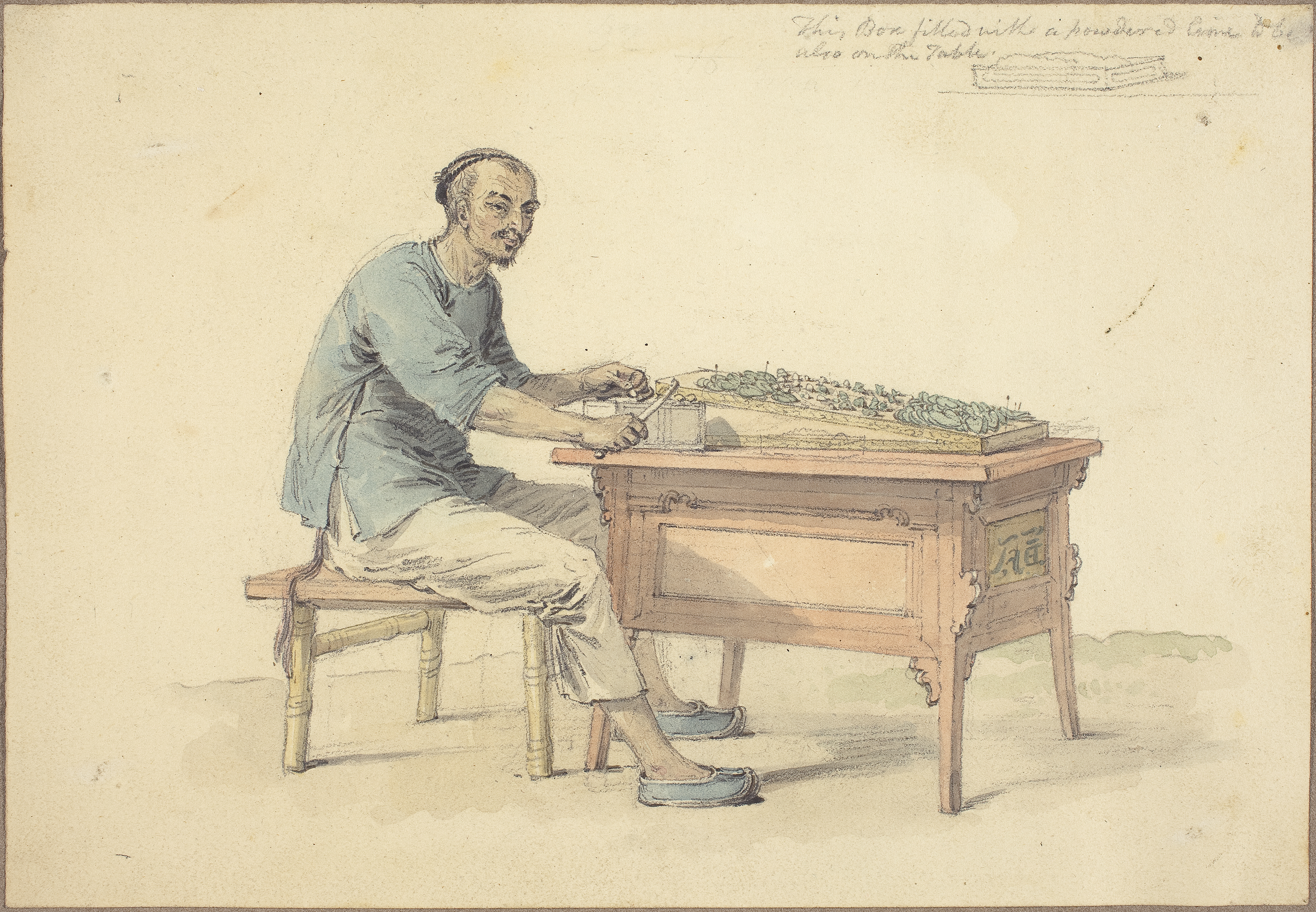
A Chinese Peasant Selling Betel, 1793–1794, by William Alexander, Department of Prints and Drawings, National Gallery of Art, Washington D.C.

== See also ==
- Kava
- Khat
- Domesticated plants and animals of Austronesia
