= C9H10 =

The molecular formula C_{9}H_{10} may refer to:

- Allylbenzene
- Cyclononatetraene
- Indane
- α-Methylstyrene (AMS)
- Phenylpropene
- trans-Propenylbenzene
- 4-Vinyltoluene
