= Phenylpropene =

Phenylpropenes broadly are compounds containing a phenyl ring bonded to propene, more specifically those with an allyl group bonded to a benzene ring, having the parent structure of allylbenzene. These comprise a class of phenylpropanoids, where there are typically other substituents bonded to the aromatic ring.

Phenylpropene specifically may refer to the following isomers of C_{9}H_{10} (molar mass 118.179 g/mol):

- trans-Propenylbenzene (trans-1-phenylpropene)
- α-Methylstyrene (2-phenylpropene)
- Allylbenzene (3-phenylpropene)
