= Tetramesityldiiron =

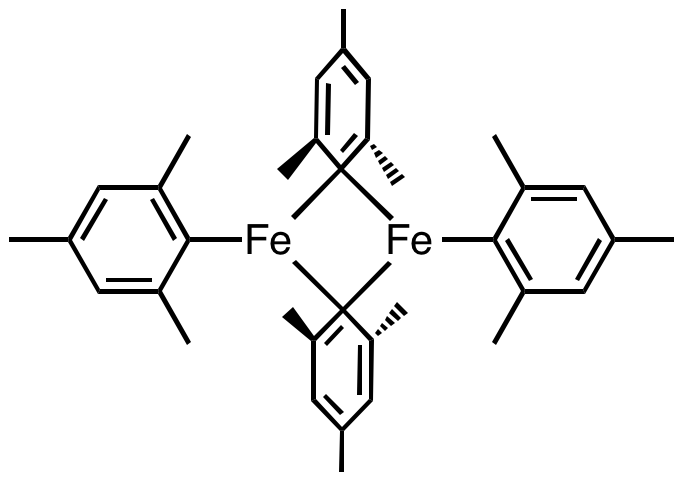

Names
- Other names dimesityliron

Identifiers
CAS Number	158100-80-2; (monomer): 59774-47-9
3D model (JSmol)	(monomer): Interactive image
ChemSpider	9138201
PubChem CID	10962987; (monomer): 12826882
- InChI: (monomer): InChI=1S/2C9H11.Fe/c2*1-7-4-8(2)6-9(3)5-7;/h2*4-5H,1-3H3;/q2*-1;+2 Key: JEIASHLOEHTPQS-UHFFFAOYSA-N
- SMILES: (monomer): c1(C)cc(C)cc(C)c1[Fe]c2c(C)cc(C)cc2(C)

Properties
Chemical formula	C_{36}H_{44}Fe_{2}
Appearance	red solid
Density	1.19 g/cm^{3}
- Except where otherwise noted, data are given for materials in their standard state (at 25 °C [77 °F], 100 kPa). Infobox references

Tetramesityldiiron is an organoiron tetramesityl compound with the formula Fe_{2}(C_{6}H_{2}(CH_{3})_{3})_{4}. It is a red, air-sensitive solid that is used as a precursor to other iron complexes. It adopts a centrosymmetric structure. The complex is a Lewis acid, forming monomeric adducts, e.g. Fe(C_{6}H_{2}(CH_{3})_{3})_{2}pyridine_{2}. The complex is prepared by treating ferrous halides with the Grignard reagent formed from mesityl bromide:

2 FeCl_{2} + 4 BrMgC_{6}H_{2}(CH_{3})_{3} → Fe_{2}(C_{6}H_{2}(CH_{3})_{3})_{4} + 2 MgBrCl
