= Mesityl bromide =

Names
- Other names 2-bromomesitylene

Identifiers
CAS Number	576-83-0
3D model (JSmol)	Interactive image
ChemSpider	21112244
ECHA InfoCard	100.008.552
EC Number	209-405-9
PubChem CID	68473
UNII	X99GJ54YDY
CompTox Dashboard (EPA)	DTXSID4060363
- InChI: InChI=1S/C9H11Br/c1-6-4-7(2)9(10)8(3)5-6/h4-5H,1-3H3 Key: RRTLQRYOJOSPEA-UHFFFAOYSA-N
- SMILES: CC1=CC(=C(C(=C1)C)Br)C

Properties
Chemical formula	C_{9}H_{11}Br
Molar mass	199.091 g·mol^{−1}
Appearance	colorless liquid
Density	1.3220 g/cm^{3}
Melting point	−1 °C (30 °F; 272 K)
Boiling point	225 °C (437 °F; 498 K)

Hazards
- GHS labelling
Pictograms	(GHS07: Exclamation mark)
Signal word	Warning
Hazard statements	H315, H319, H335
Precautionary statements	P261, P264, P271, P280, P302+P352, P304+P340, P305+P351+P338, P312, P332+P313, P337+P313, P362, P403+P233, P405, P501
- Except where otherwise noted, data are given for materials in their standard state (at 25 °C [77 °F], 100 kPa). Infobox references

Mesityl bromide is an organic compound with the formula (CH_{3})_{3}C_{6}H_{2}Br. It is a derivative of mesitylene (1,3,5-trimethylbenzene) with one ring H replaced by Br. The compound is a colorless oil. It is a standard electron-rich aryl halide substrate for cross coupling reactions. With magnesium it reacts to give the Grignard reagent, which is used in the preparation of tetramesityldiiron.

It is prepared by the direct reaction of bromine with mesitylene:

(CH_{3})_{3}C_{6}H_{3} + Br_{2} → (CH_{3})_{3}C_{6}H_{2}Br + HBr
