= Hydroxychavicol =

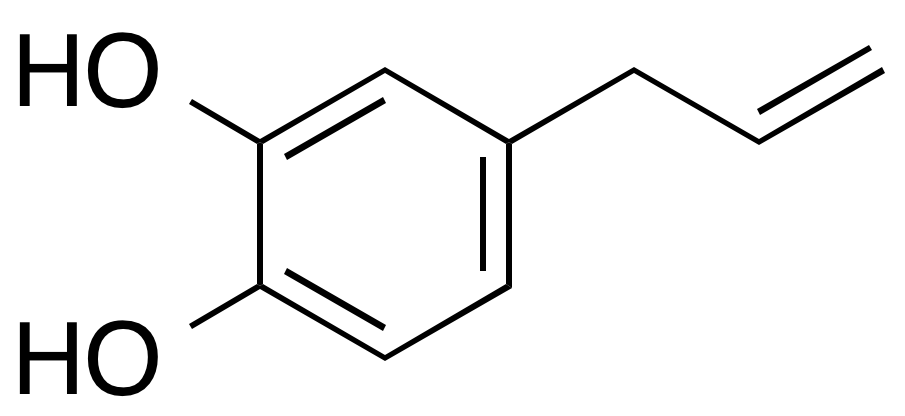

Names
- Preferred IUPAC name 4-(Prop-2-en-1-yl)benzene-1,2-diol
- Other names: 4-Allylbenzene-1,2-diol; Allylpyrocatechol; 4-Allylpyrocatechol; Desmethylisoeugenol; 3,4-dihydroxy-allylbenzene

Identifiers
| CAS Number | 1126-61-0 |
| 3D model (JSmol) | Interactive image |
| ChEMBL | ChEMBL111134 |
| ChemSpider | 63940 |
| ECHA InfoCard | 100.208.658 |
| EC Number | 683-143-7 |
| PubChem CID | 70775 |
| UNII | FG58C4J9BR |
| CompTox Dashboard (EPA) | DTXSID20150112 |
- InChI: InChI=1S/C9H10O2/c1-2-3-7-4-5-8(10)9(11)6-7/h2,4-6,10-11H,1,3H2 Key: FHEHIXJLCWUPCZ-UHFFFAOYSA-N
- SMILES: C=CCC1=CC(=C(C=C1)O)O

Properties
| Chemical formula | C_{9}H_{10}O_{2} |
| Molar mass | 150.177 g·mol^{−1} |

Hazards
- GHS labelling
| Pictograms | (GHS07: Exclamation mark) |
| Signal word | Warning |
| Hazard statements | H302, H312, H315, H319 |
| Precautionary statements | P264, P270, P280, P301+P312, P302+P352, P305+P351+P338, P312, P321, P322, P330, P332+P313, P337+P313, P362, P363, P501 |
- Except where otherwise noted, data are given for materials in their standard state (at 25 °C [77 °F], 100 kPa). Infobox references

Hydroxychavicol is a phenylpropanoid compound present in leaves of Piper betle. It is a more potent inhibitor of xanthine oxidase (IC_{50}=16.7 μM) than allopurinol.

== Research ==
It might be a useful new compound in treating cutaneous fungal infections. It is a promising agent in prevention and treatment of dental disorders as it had bactericidal and fungicidal effect on Streptococcus intermedius, Streptococcus mutans, and Candida albicans and inhibited biofilm formation.

== See also ==
- Chavicol
