= Ethyltoluene =

Organic compounds with the empirical formula CH3C6H4CH2CH3

Ethyltoluene describes organic compounds with the formula CH_{3}C_{6}H_{4}CH_{2}CH_{3}. Three isomers exist: 1,2- 1,3-, and 1,4-. All are colorless liquids, immiscible in water, with similar boiling points. They are classified are aromatic hydrocarbons. The ring bears two substituents: a methyl group and an ethyl group.

Cymenes
Name	2-ethyltoluene	3-ethyltoluene	4-Ethyltoluene
Structural formula			
CAS number	611-14-3	620-14-4	622–96–8
melting point (°C)	−80.8	−95.5	−62.3
boiling point (°C)	165	161.3	162

== Production and reactions ==
Ethyltoluenes are prepared by alkylation of toluene with ethylene:

CH_{3}C_{6}H_{5} + CH_{2}=CH_{2} → CH_{3}C_{6}H_{4}CH_{2}CH_{3}

These alkylations are catalyzed by various Lewis acids, such as aluminium trichloride.

3- and 4-Ethyltoluenes are mainly of interest as precursors to methylstyrenes:

CH_{3}C_{6}H_{4}CH_{2}CH_{3} → CH_{3}C_{6}H_{4}CH=CH_{2} + H_{2}

This dehydrogenation is conducted in the presence of zinc oxide catalysts.
