= Propylbenzene =

Propylbenzene may refer to:

- n-Propylbenzene, the straight chain isomer (IUPAC name propylbenzene)
- Cumene (isopropylbenzene)
