= Mesitylene =

Mesitylene
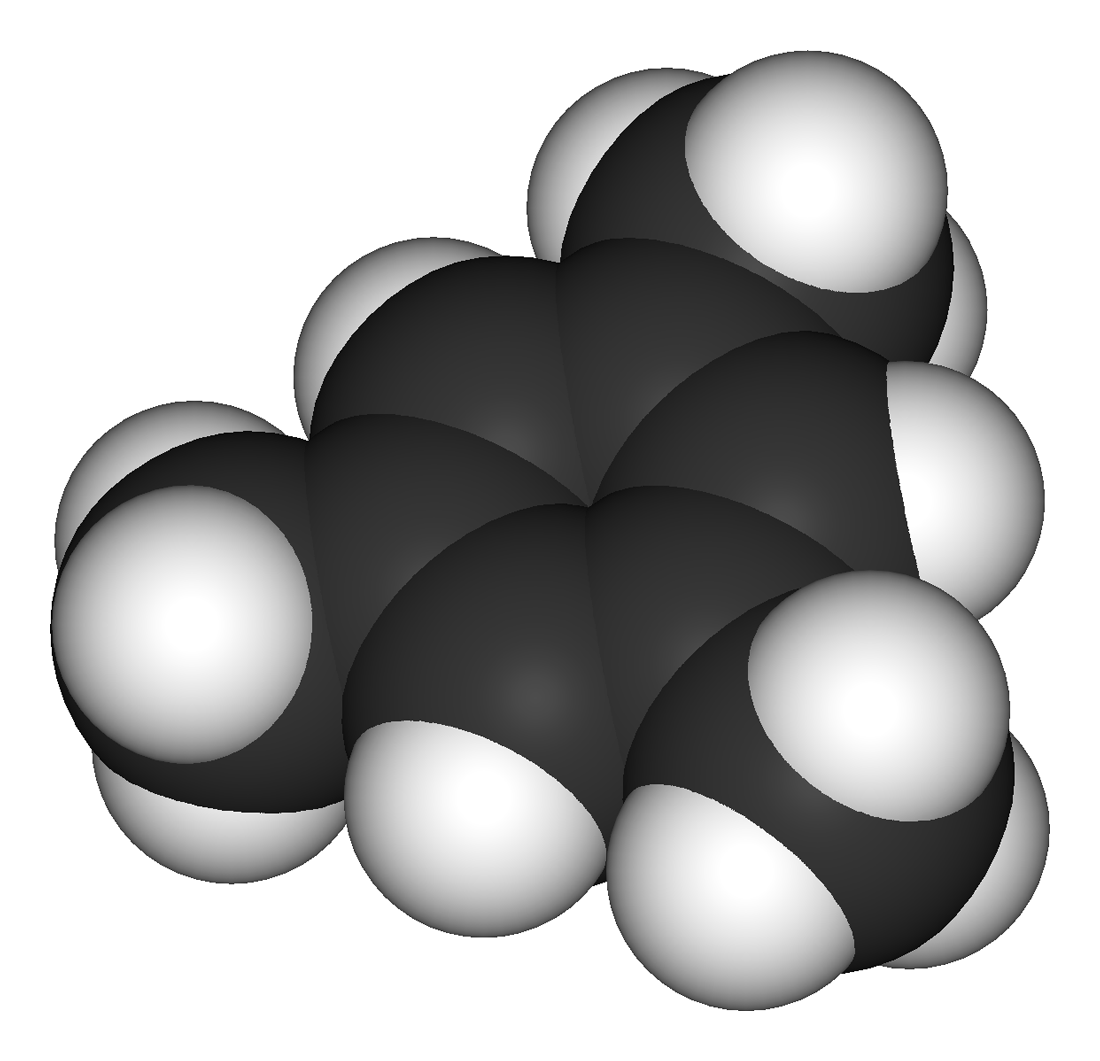
Mesitylene

Names
- Preferred IUPAC name 1,3,5-Trimethylbenzene
- Other names Mesitylene sym-Trimethylbenzene

Identifiers
CAS Number	108-67-8
3D model (JSmol)	Interactive image
ChEBI	CHEBI:34833
ChemSpider	7659
ECHA InfoCard	100.003.278
EC Number	203-604-4
KEGG	C14508
PubChem CID	7947
UNII	887L18KQ6X
UN number	2325
CompTox Dashboard (EPA)	DTXSID6026797
- InChI: InChI=1S/C9H12/c1-7-4-8(2)6-9(3)5-7/h4-6H,1-3H3 Key: AUHZEENZYGFFBQ-UHFFFAOYSA-N; InChI=1/C9H12/c1-7-4-8(2)6-9(3)5-7/h4-6H,1-3H3 Key: AUHZEENZYGFFBQ-UHFFFAOYAK
- SMILES: Cc1cc(cc(c1)C)C

Properties
Chemical formula	C_{9}H_{12}
Molar mass	120.195 g·mol^{−1}
Appearance	Colorless liquid
Odor	Distinctive, aromatic
Density	0.8637 g/cm^{3} at 20 °C
Melting point	−44.8 °C (−48.6 °F; 228.3 K)
Boiling point	164.7 °C (328.5 °F; 437.8 K)
Solubility in water	0.002% (20°C)
Vapor pressure	2 mmHg (20°C)
Magnetic susceptibility (χ)	−92.32·10^{−6} cm^{3}/mol

Structure
Dipole moment	0.047 D

Hazards
- GHS labelling
Pictograms	(GHS02: Flammable) (GHS07: Exclamation mark) (GHS09: Environmental hazard)
Signal word	Warning
Hazard statements	H226, H335, H411
Precautionary statements	P210, P233, P240, P241, P242, P243, P261, P271, P273, P280, P303+P361+P353, P304+P340, P319, P370+P378, P391, P403+P233, P403+P235, P405, P501
NFPA 704 (fire diamond)	2 2 0
Flash point	50 °C; 122 °F; 323 K
- NIOSH (US health exposure limits)
PEL (Permissible)	none
REL (Recommended)	TWA 25 ppm (125 mg/m^{3})
IDLH (Immediate danger)	N.D.
- Safety data sheet (SDS)
- Except where otherwise noted, data are given for materials in their standard state (at 25 °C [77 °F], 100 kPa). verify (what is ?) Infobox references

Mesitylene or 1,3,5-trimethylbenzene is a derivative of benzene with three methyl substituents positioned symmetrically around the ring. The other two isomeric trimethylbenzenes are 1,2,4-trimethylbenzene (pseudocumene) and 1,2,3-trimethylbenzene (hemimellitene). All three compounds have the formula C_{6}H_{3}(CH_{3})_{3}, which is commonly abbreviated C_{6}H_{3}Me_{3}. Mesitylene is a colorless liquid with sweet aromatic odor. It is a component of coal tar, which is its traditional source. It is a precursor to diverse fine chemicals. The mesityl group (Mes) is a substituent with the formula C_{6}H_{2}Me_{3} and is found in various other compounds.

== Preparation ==
Mesitylene is prepared by transalkylation of xylene over solid acid catalyst:

2 C_{6}H_{4}(CH_{3})_{2} ⇌ C_{6}H_{3}(CH_{3})_{3} + C_{6}H_{5}CH_{3}

It can also be prepared by methylation of meta-xylene:

C_{6}H_{4}(CH_{3})_{2} + CH_{3}OH → C_{6}H_{3}(CH_{3})_{3} + H_{2}O

Although impractical, it could be prepared by trimerization of propyne, also requiring an acid catalyst, which yields a mixture of 1,3,5- and 1,2,4-trimethylbenzenes.

Trimerization of acetone via aldol condensation, which is catalyzed and dehydrated by sulfuric acid is another method of synthesizing mesitylene.

== Uses and reactions ==
Mesitylene undergoes three main types of reactions: substitution at the aromatic C–H, oxidation of the methyl groups, and complexation of the aromatic ring. It also has other niche uses.

=== Ring substitution ===
The three methyl-group substituents activate the ring for electrophilic aromatic substitution.

Mesitylene is mainly used as a precursor to 2,4,6-trimethylaniline, a precursor to colorants. This derivative is prepared by selective mononitration of mesitylene, avoiding oxidation of the methyl groups.

Bromination using molecular bromine occurs readily, giving mesityl bromide:

(CH_{3})_{3}C_{6}H_{3} + Br_{2} → (CH_{3})_{3}C_{6}H_{2}Br + HBr

Laboratory quantities of mesitaldehyde are sometimes prepared from mesitylene in a Gattermann reaction variant.

The arenium ion formed by protonation is stable enough to be isolated as a salt. Mesitylenium tetrakis(pentafluorophenyl)borate is useful as a catalyst for hydrogen/deuterium exchange on other aromatic-ring compounds.

=== Methyl-group oxidation ===
Oxidation of mesitylene with nitric acid yields trimesic acid, C_{6}H_{3}(COOH)_{3}. Using manganese dioxide, a milder oxidizing agent, 3,5-dimethylbenzaldehyde is formed. Mesitylene is oxidized by trifluoroperacetic acid to produce mesitol (2,4,6-trimethylphenol).

One synthesis of uvitic acid obtains the product by oxidizing mesitylene.

=== Ring complexation ===
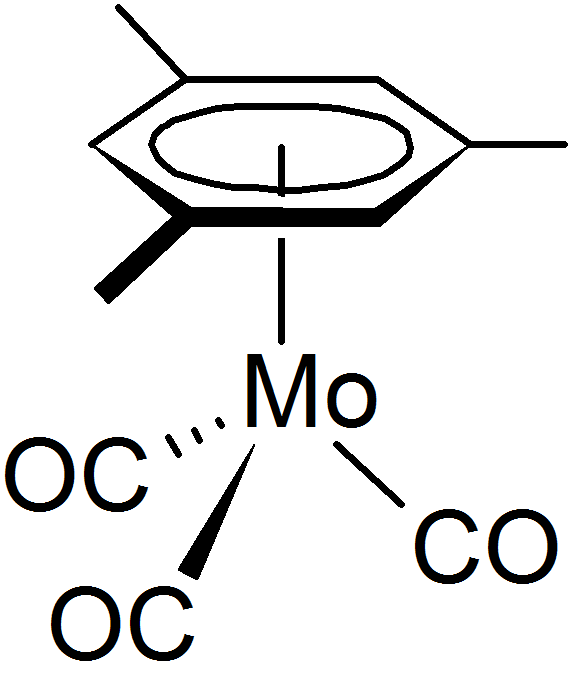
Structure of (mesitylene)molybdenum tricarbonyl, [(η^{6}-C_{6}H_{3}Me_{3})Mo(CO)_{3}]

Mesitylene is a ligand in organometallic chemistry, one example being the organomolybdenum complex [(η^{6}-C_{6}H_{3}Me_{3})Mo(CO)_{3}] which can be prepared from molybdenum hexacarbonyl.

=== Niche uses ===
Mesitylene is used in the laboratory as a specialty solvent. In the electronics industry, mesitylene has been used as a developer for photopatternable silicones due to its solvent properties.

The three aromatic hydrogen atoms of mesitylene are in identical chemical shift environments. Therefore, they only give a single peak near 6.8 ppm in the ^{1}H NMR spectrum; the same is also true for the nine methyl protons, which give a singlet near 2.3 ppm. For this reason, mesitylene is sometimes used as an internal standard in NMR samples that contain aromatic protons.

== History ==
Mesitylene was first prepared in 1837 by Robert Kane, an Irish chemist, by heating acetone with concentrated sulfuric acid. He named his new substance "mesitylene" because the German chemist Carl Reichenbach had named acetone "mesit" (from the Greek μεσίτης, the mediator), and Kane believed that his reaction had dehydrated mesit, converting it to an alkene, "mesitylene". However, Kane's determination of the chemical composition ("empirical formula") of mesitylene was incorrect. An accurate elemental analysis was provided by August W. von Hofmann in 1849, although von Hofmann also mistook the empirical formula because he used a then-current atomic weight of 6 for carbon. In 1866 Adolf von Baeyer gave a correct empirical formula, but proposed a tetracyclo[3.1.1.1^{1,}3.1^{3,5}]nonane structure:

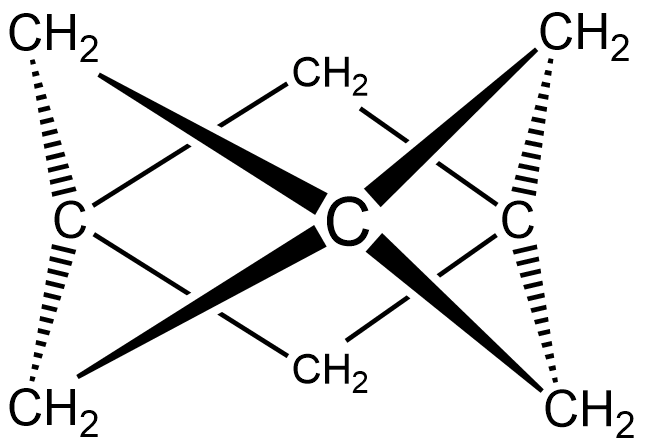

Finally, Albert Ladenburg provided conclusive proof that mesitylene was trimethylbenzene in 1874, which he wrote in terms of Ladenburg benzene (see Benzene § Ring formula):

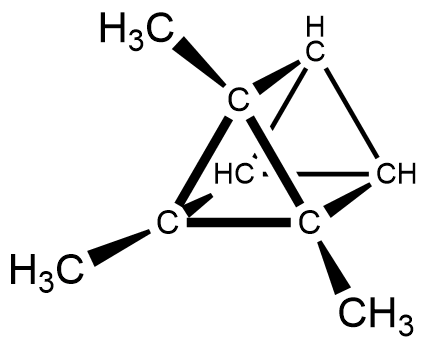

== Mesityl group ==
Mesityl substituents are employed to produce a stable analogue of the elusive PbH_{2}:(C_{6}H_{3}-2,6-(mesityl)_{2})PbH dimer

The group (CH_{3})_{3}C_{6}H_{2}- is called mesityl (organic group symbol: Mes). Due to its large steric demand, the mesityl group is used as a large blocking group in asymmetric catalysis (to enhance diastereo- or enantioselectivity) and organometallic chemistry (to stabilize low oxidation state or low coordination number metal centers). Transition metal mesityl derivatives, e.g. tetramesityldiiron, are typically prepared from the Grignard reagent (CH_{3})_{3}C_{6}H_{2}MgBr.

Larger analogues with even greater steric demand, for example 2,6-diisopropylphenyl (Dipp) and the analogously named Tripp ((^{i}Pr)_{3}C_{6}H_{2}, Is) and supermesityl ((^{t}Bu)_{3}C_{6}H_{2}, Mes*) groups, may be even more effective toward achieving these goals.
