= 1,2,4-Trimethylbenzene =

Skeletal formula
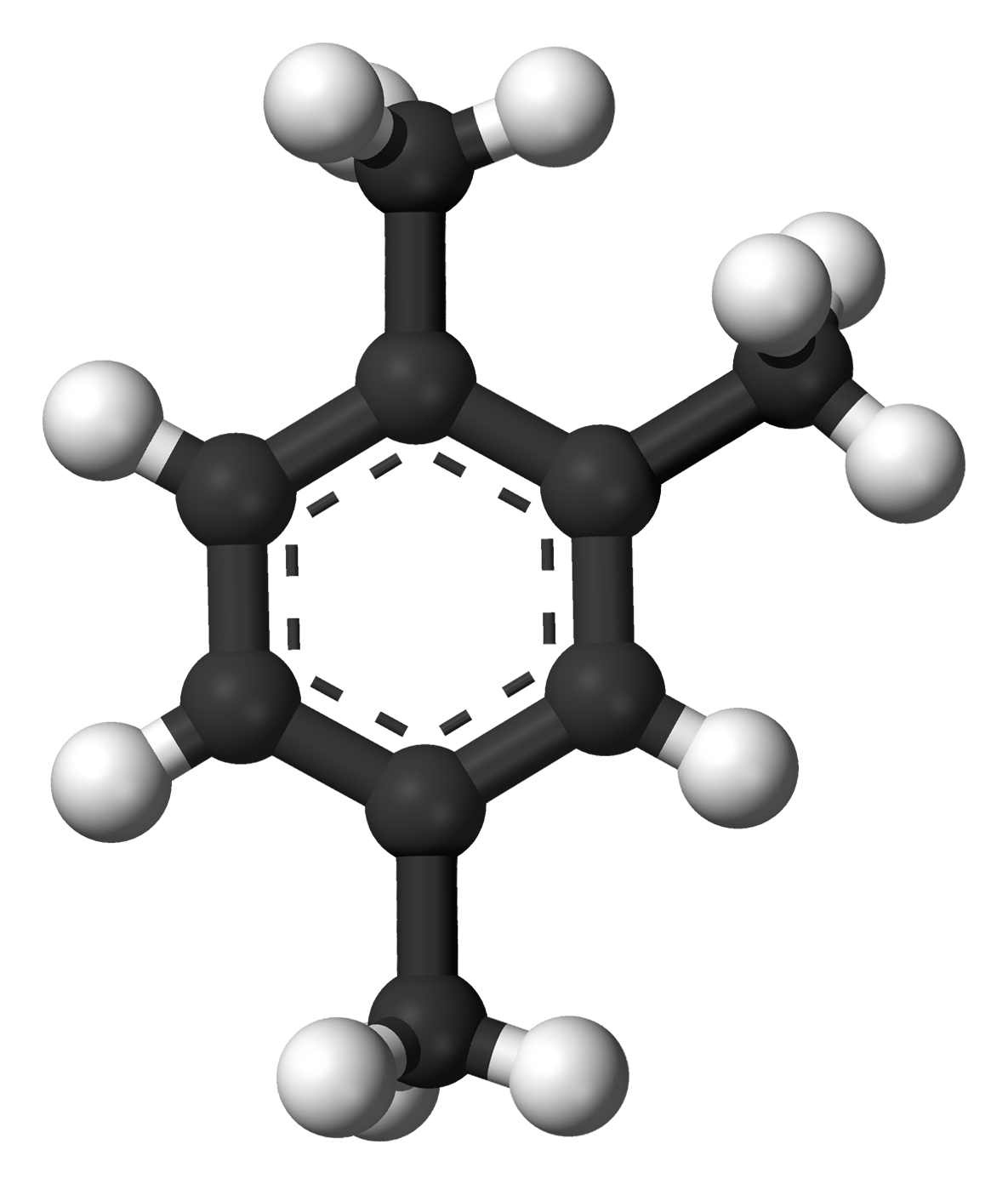
Ball-and-stick model

Names
- Preferred IUPAC name 1,2,4-Trimethylbenzene
- Other names: Pseudocumene; Asymmetrical trimethylbenzene; Ψ-Cumene

Identifiers
CAS Number	95-63-6
3D model (JSmol)	Interactive image
Beilstein Reference	1903005
ChEBI	CHEBI:34039
ChEMBL	ChEMBL1797280
ChemSpider	6977
ECHA InfoCard	100.002.216
EC Number	202-436-9
KEGG	C14533
PubChem CID	7247
RTECS number	DC3325000
UNII	34X0W8052F
UN number	1993 2325
CompTox Dashboard (EPA)	DTXSID6021402
- InChI: InChI=1S/C9H12/c1-7-4-5-8(2)9(3)6-7/h4-6H,1-3H3 Key: GWHJZXXIDMPWGX-UHFFFAOYSA-N; InChI=1/C9H12/c1-7-4-5-8(2)9(3)6-7/h4-6H,1-3H3 Key: GWHJZXXIDMPWGX-UHFFFAOYAF
- SMILES: c1c(ccc(c1C)C)C

Properties
Chemical formula	C_{9}H_{12}
Molar mass	120.195 g·mol^{−1}
Appearance	Colorless liquid
Density	0.8758 g/cm^{3} (20 °C (68 °F))
Melting point	−43.8 °C (−46.8 °F; 229.3 K)
Boiling point	169.4 °C (336.9 °F; 442.5 K)
Critical point (T, P)	649.1 K at 3.3 MPa
Solubility in water	0.057 g/L
log P	3.63
Vapor pressure	2.3 hPa (20 °C (68 °F))
Magnetic susceptibility (χ)	−101.6×10^{−6} cm^{3}/mol
Refractive index (n_{D})	1.5048 (20 °C (68 °F))

Thermochemistry
Enthalpy of fusion (Δ_{f}H^{⦵}_{fus})	13.19 kJ⋅mol^{−1}
Enthalpy of vaporization (Δ_{f}H_{vap})	47.93 kJ⋅mol^{−1} (25 °C (77 °F))

Hazards
- GHS labelling
Pictograms	(GHS02: Flammable) (GHS08: Health hazard) (GHS07: Exclamation mark) (GHS09: Environmental hazard)
Signal word	Danger
Hazard statements	H226, H304, H315, H319, H332, H335, H411
Precautionary statements	P210, P233, P240, P241, P242, P243, P261, P264, P271, P273, P280, P301+P310, P303+P361+P353, P304+P340+P312, P305+P351+P338, P331, P332+P313, P337+P313, P362, P370+P378, P391, P403+P233, P403+P235, P405, P501
NFPA 704 (fire diamond)	2 2 0
Flash point	48 °C (118 °F; 321 K)
Autoignition temperature	515 °C (959 °F; 788 K)
Explosive limits	0.9%–6.4%
- NIOSH (US health exposure limits)
REL (Recommended)	25 ppm

Related compounds
Related compounds	1,2,3-Trimethylbenzene; 1,3,5-Trimethylbenzene
- Except where otherwise noted, data are given for materials in their standard state (at 25 °C [77 °F], 100 kPa). verify (what is ?) Infobox references

1,2,4-Trimethylbenzene, also known as pseudocumene, is an organic compound with the chemical formula C_{6}H_{3}(CH_{3})_{3}. Classified as an aromatic hydrocarbon, it is a flammable colorless liquid with a strong odor. It is nearly insoluble in water but soluble in organic solvents. It occurs naturally in coal tar and petroleum (about 3%). It is one of the three isomers of trimethylbenzene.

== History ==
In 1849, Charles Blachford Mansfield rectified coal tar and identified fractions which he hypothesized to be cumole and cymole. The latter fraction boiled slightly above 170 °C (338 °F) and had specific density of 0.857.

In 1862, Warren De la Rue and Hugo Müller (1833-1915) proposed the term pseudocumole for the fractions heavier than xylole.

When three years later American chemist Cyrus Warren (1824-1891) attempted to reproduce Mansfield's results, he determined that the oil boiling at 170 °C (338 °F) has the same formula as cumole, not cymole, and suggested to name it isocumole.

The structure of the compound was determined by Th. Ernst and Wilhelm Rudolph Fittig, who first prepared it from bromoxylene and iodomethane in 1866 by a Wurtz–Fittig reaction developed two years earlier.

In the next year, Fittig et al. adopted the pseudocumol terminology, in 1869 Fittig and B. Wackenroder proved that the fraction is a mixture of mesitylene with another trimethylbenzene, for which the name of pseudocumol was retained, and in 1886 Oscar Jacobsen showed that the third trimethylbenzene he discovered earlier is also present.

== Production ==
Industrially, it is isolated from the C_{9} aromatic hydrocarbon fraction during petroleum distillation. Approximately 40% of this fraction is 1,2,4-trimethylbenzene. It is also generated by methylation of toluene and xylenes and the disproportionation of xylene over aluminosilicate catalysts.

== Uses ==
Pseudocumene is a precursor to trimellitic anhydride, from which high performance polymers are made. It is also used as a sterilizing agent and in the making of dyes, perfumes and resins. Another use is as an antiknock agent, since its research and motor octane numbers are well above 100.

In automobile fuel it is a minor additive, with its share in US gasoline rising from 0.03%–0.5% in early 1990s to 1.1%–2.6% in 2011. It may be a major component of some avgas formulations.

=== Scintillator ===
1,2,4-Trimethylbenzene dissolved in mineral oil is used as a liquid scintillator in particle physics experiments such as NOνA and Borexino.

== See also ==
- Cumene
