= Mesitaldehyde =

Chemical compound

Names
- IUPAC name 2,4,6-Trimethylbenzaldehyde
- Other names: 2-Formylmesitylene; 2-Mesitylenecarboxaldehyde; Aldehydomesitylene; 2,4,6-Trimethylbenzaldehyde; Isodural; Mesitaldehyde; Mesityl aldehyde; Mesitylenecarboxaldehyde

Identifiers
CAS Number	487-68-3
3D model (JSmol)	Interactive image
ChEBI	CHEBI:195893
ChEMBL	ChEMBL3560744
ChemSpider	CU8500000
ECHA InfoCard	100.006.966
EC Number	207-662-1
PubChem CID	10254
UNII	4W00MG84DR
CompTox Dashboard (EPA)	DTXSID5052125
- InChI: InChI=1S/C10H12O/c1-7-4-8(2)10(6-11)9(3)5-7/h4-6H,1-3H3 Key: HIKRJHFHGKZKRI-UHFFFAOYSA-N
- SMILES: CC1=CC(=C(C(=C1)C)C=O)C

Properties
Chemical formula	C_{10}H_{12}O
Molar mass	148.205 g·mol^{−1}
Appearance	Clear colorless to light yellow liquid
Odor	Pungent
Density	1.018 g/mL at 20 °C
Melting point	14 °C (57 °F; 287 K)
Boiling point	238.50 °C (461.30 °F; 511.65 K)

Hazards
- GHS labelling
Pictograms	(GHS07: Exclamation mark) (GHS09: Environmental hazard)
Signal word	Warning
Hazard statements	H315, H319, H335
Precautionary statements	P280, P305+P351+P338
Flash point	105.6 °C (222.1 °F; 378.8 K)
- Except where otherwise noted, data are given for materials in their standard state (at 25 °C [77 °F], 100 kPa). Infobox references

Mesitaldehyde or mesitylaldehyde is a colorless aromatic aldehyde. It is a liquid with a characteristic odor. It is commonly used as a precursor in the synthesis of various organic compounds, including pharmaceuticals, fragrances, and dyes.

== Properties ==
Mesitaldehyde is a derivative of benzaldehyde, with three methyl groups attached to the benzene ring at positions 2, 4, and 6. This substitution with electron-donating methyl groups activates the aromatic ring for further electrophilic substitution reactions. Due to the hydrophobicity of the methyl groups, it is less soluble in water but more soluble in organic solvents. It is stable at ordinary temperatures.

== Synthesis and uses ==
Mesitaldehyde is synthesized through the oxidation of mesitylene in acidic medium, typically using oxidants like chromium trioxide or potassium permanganate, followed by purification steps to isolate the aldehyde. It can also be prepared by formylation of mesitylene by reacting Mesitylene with a formyl group source such as paraformaldehyde or DMF (N,N-dimethylformamide) under specific conditions with a suitable catalyst. There are many other methods such as oxidation of acetylmesitylene by potassium permanganate, reduction of mesitoyl chloride, reaction of mesityllithum with iron pentacarbonyl, etc.

It is primarily used as an intermediate in organic synthesis for various products such as pharmaceuticals, dyes, and fragrances. Due to its reactive nature, mesitaldehyde itself isn't likely the final drug molecule in medications.

== See also ==
- Mesitylene
