= Trimethylbenzene =

Group of isomeric chemical compounds

The trimethylbenzenes constitute a group of substances of aromatic hydrocarbons, which structure consists of a benzene ring with three methyl groups (–CH_{3}) as a substituent. Through their different arrangement, they form three structural isomers with the molecular formula C_{9}H_{12}. They also belong to the group of C_{3}-benzenes. The best-known isomer is mesitylene.

Trimethylbenzenes
Common name	hemimellitene	pseudocumene	mesitylene
Systematic names	1,2,3-trimethylbenzene vic.-trimethylbenzene	1,2,4-trimethylbenzene asym.-trimethylbenzene	1,3,5-trimethylbenzene sym.-trimethylbenzene
Structural formula			
CAS Registry Number	526-73-8	95-63-6	108-67-8
