= Bromoxylene =

A bromoxylene is an aromatic compound containing a benzene ring linked with two methyl groups, and a bromine atom. There are several isomers.

name	CasNo	PubChem
4-Bromo-o-xylene	583-71-1	CID 68504 from PubChem
3-Bromo-o-xylene	576-23-8	CID 68472 from PubChem
2-Bromo-m-xylene	576-22-7	CID 68471 from PubChem
4-Bromo-m-xylene	583-70-0	CID 68503 from PubChem
5-Bromo-m-xylene	556-96-7	CID 136357 from PubChem
2-Bromo-p-xylene	553-94-6	CID 11121 from PubChem
