= Tetramesityl compounds =

Homoleptic tetra-mesityl complexes of transition metals in the +4 oxidation state, (IV), denoted as M(mes)_{4}, constitute a category of organometallic substances that remain relatively unexplored. Characterized by tetrahedral coordination geometry, these compounds exhibit distinctive electrochemical, magnetic, and optical properties. Their unique attributes surpass those of their isostructural counterparts in group 14, commonly employed as fundamental components in advanced molecular materials like covalent- and metal–organic frameworks, polymers, self-assembled monolayers, and single-molecule electronic devices. Recent advancements, showcase the potential of modular, isostructural M(aryl) units in providing novel avenues for adjusting the electrochemical energy storage capacity, electrocatalytic functionality, and electrical conductivity/conductance of such materials, opening up various applications.

The synthesis and reaction chemistry of several homoleptic transition metal tetramesityl complexes has been reported, and conclusive identification has been provided through X-ray structural studies. Among the various M(aryl)_{4} materials, Os(IV) and Ru(IV) are particularly noteworthy, especially when they feature ortho-methylated sigma-aryl ligands. This is because these compounds exhibit remarkable robustness, as their stability can be attributed to a d^{4} low-spin electronic configuration, with the ligand methyl groups effectively inhibiting decomposition pathways such as reductive elimination and ortho-hydrogen abstraction. These compounds can be purified through air chromatography and their aryl ligands can be subjected to chemical functionalization using various methods such as bromination, Suzuki coupling, and Friedel-Crafts acylation. Os(aryl)_{4} compounds have rich redox chemistry, which allows for the early isolation of a stable paramagnetic Os(V) complex.

== Synthesis ==
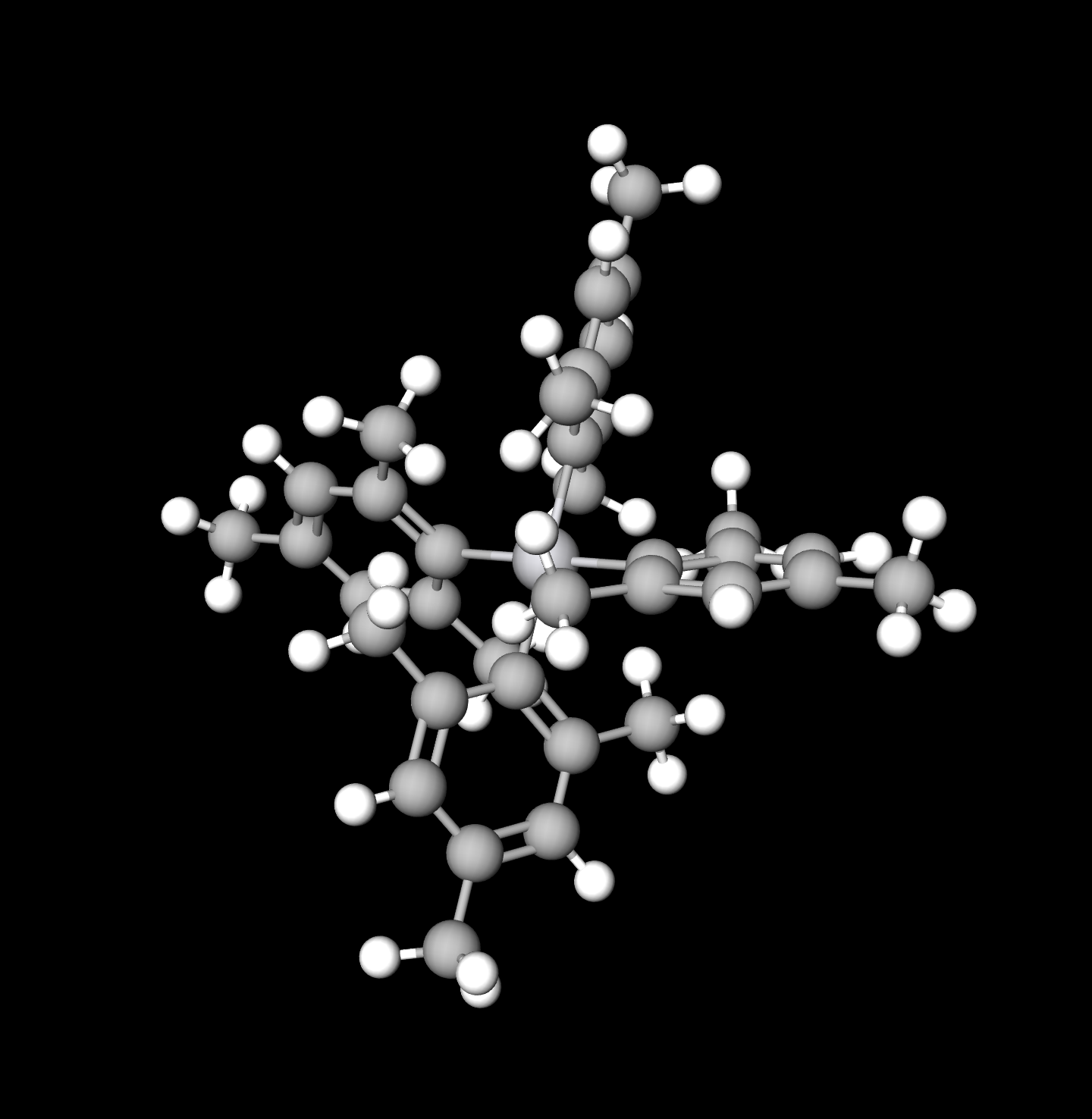
Molecular structure of V(mes)_{4}

=== Tetramesityl vanadium ===
Trimesitylvanadium was first reported by Seidel and Kreisel in 1974 with the formula V(C_{9}H_{11})_{3}(THF)_{n}. They then moved on to explore the synthesis tetramesityl vanadium compounds. Tetramesityl vanadium was prepared by adding one equivalent of mesLi to V(mes) in THF-Et_{2}O to form this intermidate, V(mes)_{4}Li. Air oxidation of the intermediate formed V(mes)_{4}. An X-ray study shows V(mes)_{4}, to have a slightly distorted tetrahedral structure.

V(mes)_{3}THF + mesLi → [V(mes)_{4}]Li

[V(mes)_{4}]^{−} + O_{2} → V(mes)_{4}

=== Tetramesityl iridium ===
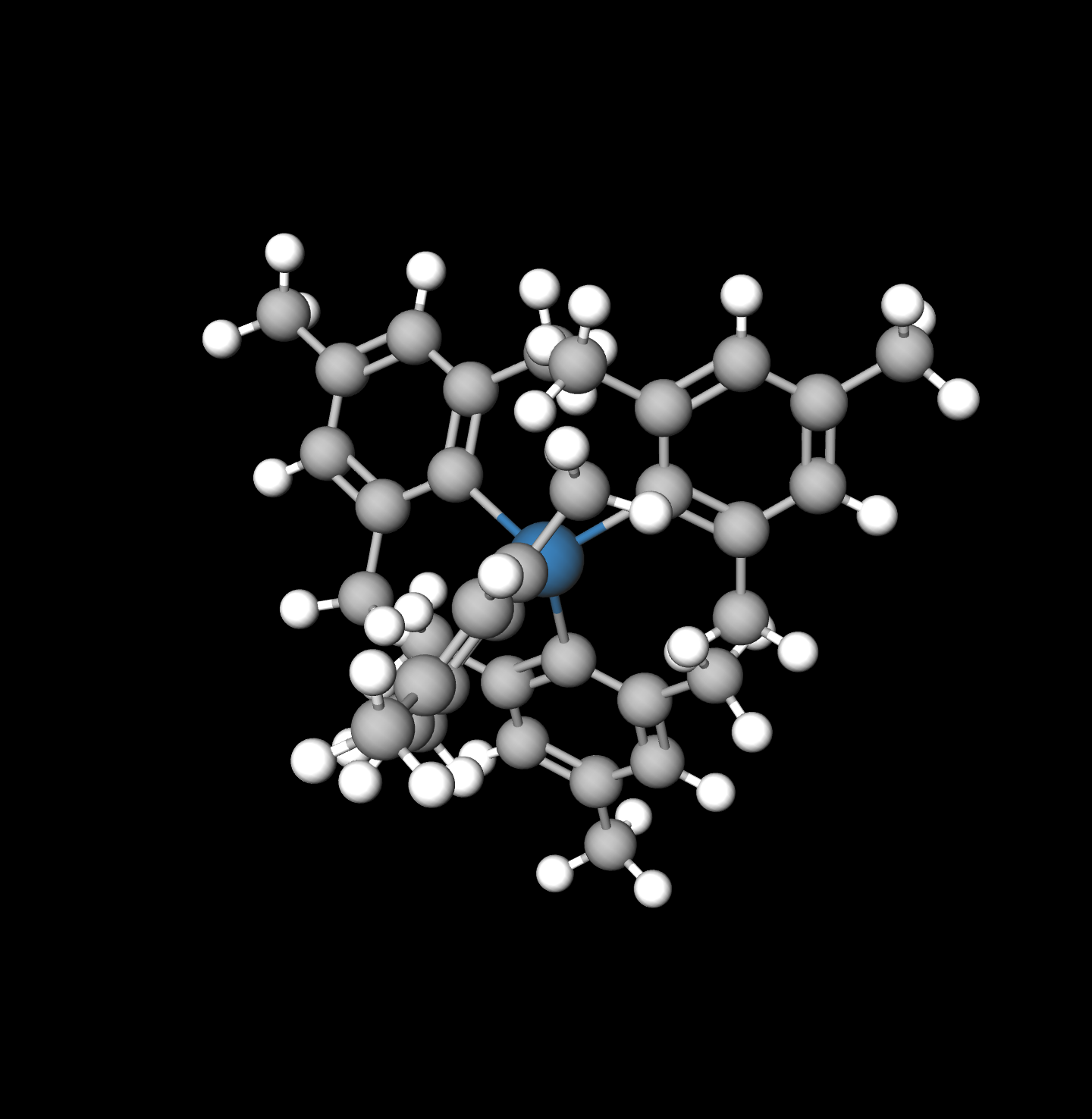
Molecular structure of Ir(mes)_{4}

The synthesis, X-ray structure and reactions of tretra-(mesityl)rhodium(IV) (mesityl = 2,4,6-trimethylphenyl, mes) was described. Hursthouse et al. reported the synthesis of Ir(mes)_{4}, along with the X-ray crystal structure.

The reaction of partially dehydraterd IrCl_{3}(nH_{2}O) with 2,4,6-trimethylphenyllithium at -20 °C, resulted in the tetrakis(mesityl)ruthenium complex.

Ir(Cl)_{3}·nH_{2}O + mesLi → [Ir(mes)_{4}]

No product was obtained when tetrahydrofuran was used as a solvent although Ir(mes)_{4}, is stable in tetrahydrofuran. The yield, which never exceed about 20%, was dependent on the IrCl_{3}(nH_{2}O) batch and on the drying process. The results showcased that the reaction of IrCl_{3} results in the generation of an iridium(IV) compound. One possible explanation had to do with a disproportionation reaction, as no other product could be isolated.

2Ir^^{−}_{3}> Ir^_{2} + Ir^_{2}

A possible intermediate could have been Li[Ir(mes)_{4}] but, Ir(mes)_{3} , does not react with Li(mes) in Et_{2}O and careful air-oxidation of the ether solution gives no Ir(mes)4.

The product was obtained by evaporation, extraction of the residue with hexane, and crystallization at -20 °C. The resulting brown crystals had a melting point of 138-139 °C and were obtained in a yield of about 15%. The remaining substance after hexane extraction is black in color and is insoluble in organic solvents. The tetramesityl compound is stable in both solid and hexane solution states even when exposed to air. However, if it is heated in an air environment, it undergoes decomposition, leading to the formation of a green, diamagnetic substance.

The tetramesityl compound's structure has been determined through X-ray crystallography. The geometry of the compound is best described as distorted tetrahedral, with C-Ir-C angles ranging from 89.0 to 123.9 degrees. The Ir-C bond lengths range from 1.99 to 2.02 A. The distortion in the low-spin iridium(IV) system is likely due to steric factors, which result from the distribution and orientation of the ligands in a way that minimizes non-bonding interactions between them. The electronic properties of the system are not likely to be the origin of the distortion.

=== Homoleptic tetramesityl ruthenium(IV) complex ===
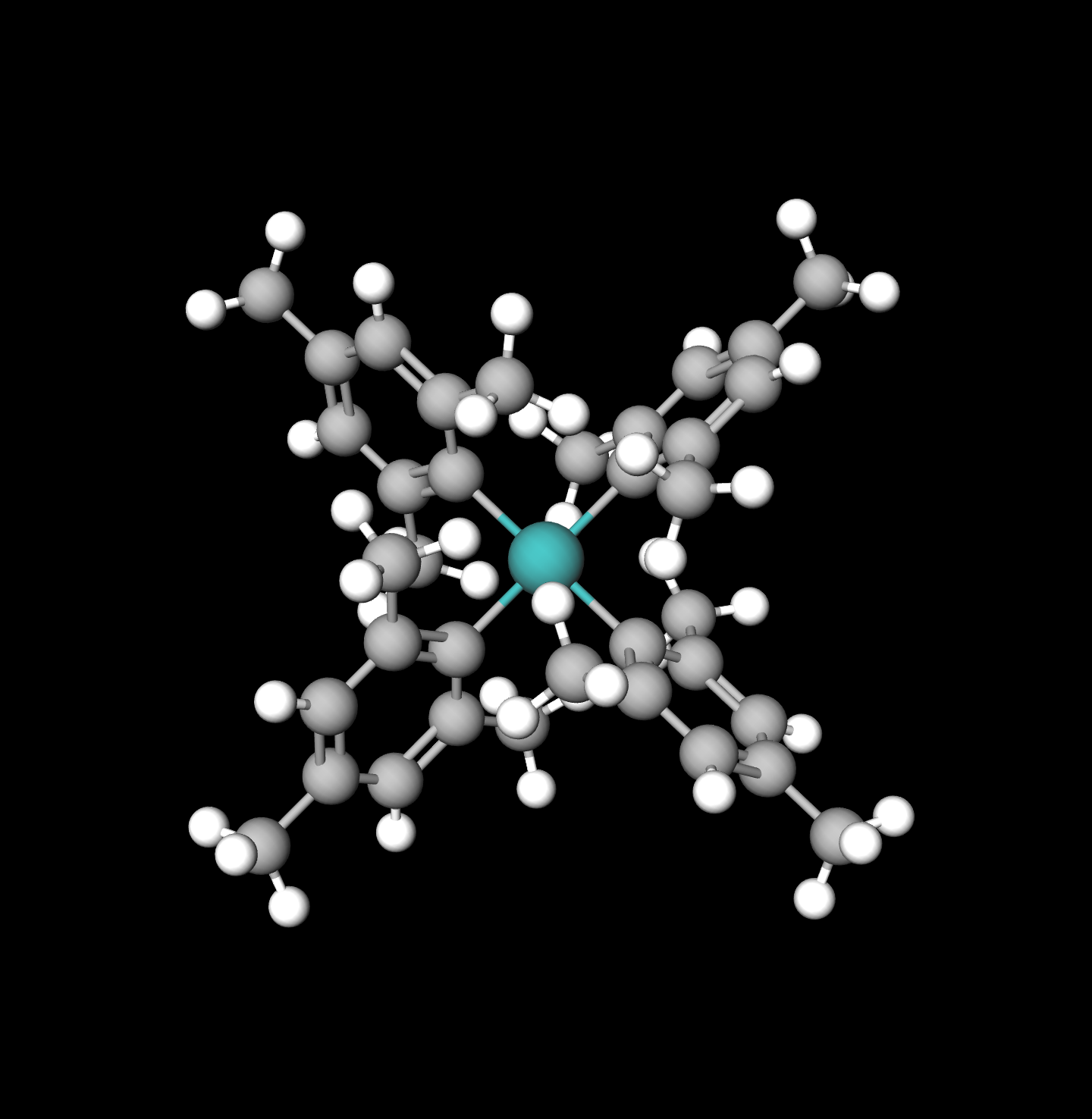
Molecular structure of Ru(mes)_{4}

Previously, Wilkinson and his colleagues reported a series of tetra-arylruthenium(IV) complexes. The procedure follows RuCl_{3}(tht), tht = tetrahydrothiophene, in Et_{2}O at -78 °C was added a solution of Mg(mes)_{2}(thf), thf = tetrahydrofuran with vigorous stirring. After warming and stirring at room temperature the solution was evaporated under vacuum and the residue extracted with light petroleum. The extracts were reduced, filtered and cooled to give feathery crystals with 18% yield.

RuCl_{3}(tht) + Mg(mes)_{2}(thf) → [Ru(mes)_{4}]

In order to improve the yield of tetra-mes ruthenium(IV), complexes recent advances have synthesized homoleptic tetraarylruthenium(IV) complex Ru(2,4,5-Me_{3}C_{6}H_{2})_{4}with a moderate yield of 37%. The procedure follows [Ru(acac)_{3}] in THF at -78 °C was added to a 7 equiv. of (2,4,5-Me_{3}C_{6}H_{2})MgBr in THF.

[Ru(acac)_{3}] + 2,_{4},^{−}_{5}Me_{3}C_{6}H_{2}MgBr → [Ru(mes)_{4}]

The resulting brown mixture was stirred at room temperature overnight and followed by column chromatography in air, afforded the homoleptic tetra-mes ruthenium(IV) complex [Ru(2,4,5-Me_{3}C_{6}H_{2})_{4}] as a purple crystalline solid in 37% isolated yield. The geometry around the central ruthenium atom is a slightly distorted tetrahedral. The C-Ru-C bond angles in the complex [Ru(2,4,5-Me_{3}C_{6}H_{2})_{4}] are 98.9(6)–117.4(6)°. This is possibly as a result of the steric effect of two ortho-methyl moieties in mesityl groups.

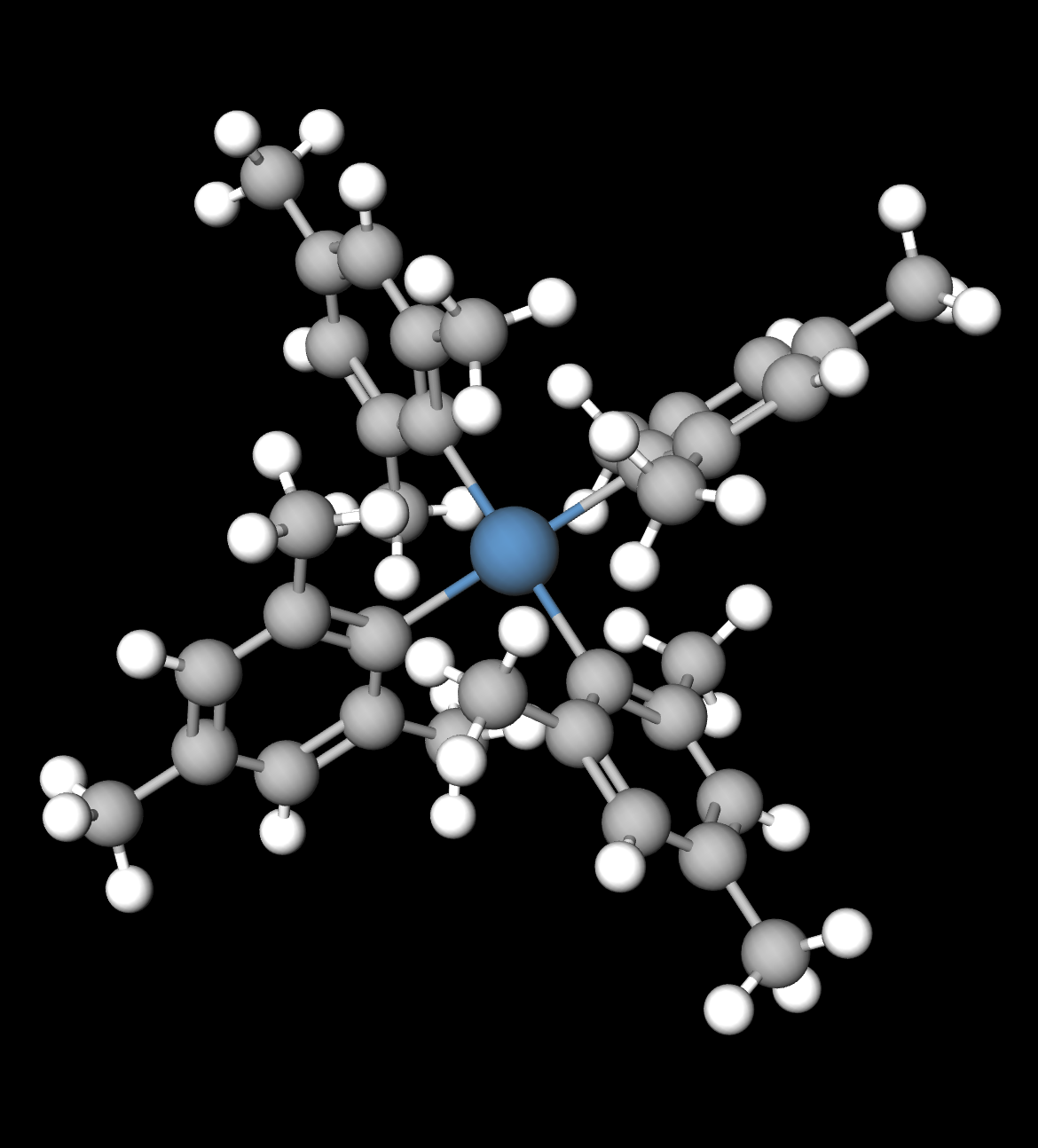
Molecular structure of Os(mes)_{4}

=== Osmium(IV) tetramesityl complex ===
Obtaining Os(aryl)_{4} through the most common reaction of aryl Grignard reagents with OsO_{4} often results in poor yields, usually ≤34%. Moreover, the high toxicity of OsO_{4} and the presence of monooxo(tetraaryl)osmium(vi) and bisoxo(diaryl)osmium(vi) side products add extra complications to the purification process. Therefore, it is desirable to develop higher-yielding preparative approaches using alternative starting reagents.

Recent work has attempted to address the issue surrounding yields of Os(aryl)_{4} complexes. with an improved synthetic route to osmium(IV) tetraaryl complexes, starting from new tetra-n-octylammonium hexahaloosmate(IV) precursors (Oct_{4}N)_{2}[OsBr_{6}]. This intermediate reacts with mesitylmagnesium bromide to obtain Os(mesityl)_{4} with an isolated yield of 5%.

[NH_{4}]_{2}[OsBr_{6}] + (Oct_{4}N)Br → (Oct_{4}N)_{2}[OsBr_{6}] + mesMgBr → Os(mes)_{4}

This complex comprises previously inaccessible sterically demanding 2,6-dimethyl-substituted aryl ligands. Through their density functional theory (DFT) calculations, they were able to determine why they obtained such a low yield. The four mesityl groups of Os(mesityl)4 are arranged in a particularly distorted tetrahedral geometry (T-value = 8.02, C–Os–C angles between 98.4–117.2°). This analysis further supports the view that steric constraints due to 2,6-dimethyl substituents contribute to the lower synthetic yield.

== Reactivity ==
There have been papers describing the X-ray structures, reactivity, spectroscopic, and electrochemical behavior of a series of ruthenium and osmium tetraaryl complexes. The tetra-o-tolyls of ruthenium and osmium have isostructural properties, with tetrahedral coordination environments around the metal atoms. Complexes of both metals are diamagnetic and show four equivalent o-tolyl groups in the 'H NMR spectrum. The ruthenium aryl is thermally very robust and exhibits the parent ion in the mass spectrum, as well as peaks due to sequential loss of o-tolyl groups.
