= 4-Ethyltoluene =

Names
- Preferred IUPAC name 1-Ethyl-4-methylbenzene
- Other names p-Ethylmethylbenzene, p-Ethyltoluene

Identifiers
CAS Number	622-96-8
3D model (JSmol)	Interactive image
ChemSpider	11660
ECHA InfoCard	100.009.784
PubChem CID	12160
UNII	G6JY83VLB5
CompTox Dashboard (EPA)	DTXSID9029194
- InChI: InChI=1S/C9H12/c1-3-9-6-4-8(2)5-7-9/h4-7H,3H2,1-2H3 Key: JRLPEMVDPFPYPJ-UHFFFAOYSA-N
- SMILES: CCc1ccc(cc1)C

Properties
Chemical formula	C_{9}H_{12}
Molar mass	120.195 g·mol^{−1}
Appearance	colorless liquid
Density	0.861 g/cm^{3}
Boiling point	162 °C (324 °F; 435 K)
- Except where otherwise noted, data are given for materials in their standard state (at 25 °C [77 °F], 100 kPa). Infobox references

4-Ethyltoluene is an organic compound with the formula CH_{3}C_{6}H_{4}C_{2}H_{5}. It is one of three isomers of ethyltoluene, the other two isomers being 3-ethyltoluene and 2-ethyltoluene. All are colorless liquids and all are used for the production of specialty polystyrenes.

== Production and use ==
Ethyltoluene is produced by ethylation of toluene:

CH_{3}C_{6}H_{5} + C_{2}H_{4} → CH_{3}C_{6}H_{4}C_{2}H_{5}

Over typical acid catalysts, this process gives a mixture of the 2-, 3-, and 4- isomers. Using a modified zeolite catalyst, the alkylation is shape-selective for the 4- isomer.

4-Ethyltoluene is subjected dehydrogenation to give 4-vinyltoluene.
