= N-Propylbenzene =

n-Propylbenzene, phenylpropane

Names
- Preferred IUPAC name Propylbenzene

Identifiers
CAS Number	103-65-1
3D model (JSmol)	Interactive image
Abbreviations	NPB; PhPr; Phn-Pr; PhnPr; Ph^{n}Pr
ChEBI	CHEBI:42630
ChEMBL	ChEMBL286062
ChemSpider	7385
ECHA InfoCard	100.002.848
EC Number	203-132-9
PubChem CID	7668
UNII	0WR86ZHG2Z
UN number	2364 (N-PROPYL BENZENE)
CompTox Dashboard (EPA)	DTXSID3042219
- InChI: InChI=1S/C9H12/c1-2-6-9-7-4-3-5-8-9/h3-5,7-8H,2,6H2,1H3 Key: ODLMAHJVESYWTB-UHFFFAOYSA-N
- SMILES: CCCC1=CC=CC=C1

Properties
Chemical formula	C_{9}H_{12}
Molar mass	120.195 g·mol^{−1}
Appearance	colorless liquid
Density	0.8620 g/cm^{3}
Melting point	−99.5 °C (−147.1 °F; 173.7 K)
Boiling point	159.2 °C (318.6 °F; 432.3 K)

Hazards
- GHS labelling
Pictograms	(GHS02: Flammable) (GHS07: Exclamation mark) (GHS08: Health hazard) (GHS09: Environmental hazard)
Signal word	Danger
Hazard statements	H226, H304, H335, H411
Precautionary statements	P210, P233, P240, P241, P242, P243, P261, P271, P273, P280, P301+P316, P303+P361+P353, P304+P340, P319, P331, P370+P378, P391, P403+P233, P403+P235, P405, P501
- Except where otherwise noted, data are given for materials in their standard state (at 25 °C [77 °F], 100 kPa). Infobox references

n-Propylbenzene is an aromatic hydrocarbon with the formula C_{9}H_{12} or C_{6}H_{5}CH_{2}CH_{2}CH_{3}. The molecule consists of a propyl group attached to a phenyl ring. It is a colorless liquid. A more common structural isomer of this compound is cumene.

n-Propylbenzene is used as a nonpolar organic solvent in various industries, including printing and the dyeing of textiles and in the manufacture of methylstyrene. It can be synthesized by the reaction of the Grignard reagent derived from benzyl chloride with diethyl sulfate.
