= 4-Vinyltoluene =

Names
- Preferred IUPAC name 1-Ethenyl-4-methylbenzene
- Other names 1-Methyl-4-vinylbenzene; 4-Methylstyrene

Identifiers
CAS Number	622-97-9
3D model (JSmol)	Interactive image
ChemSpider	11661
ECHA InfoCard	100.009.785
EC Number	210-762-8
MeSH	C042272
PubChem CID	12161
UNII	HJ7H0G60Q0
CompTox Dashboard (EPA)	DTXSID3020889
- InChI: InChI=1S/C9H10/c1-3-9-6-4-8(2)5-7-9/h3-7H,1H2,2H3 Key: JLBJTVDPSNHSKJ-UHFFFAOYSA-N
- SMILES: CC1=CC=C(C=C)C=C1

Properties
Chemical formula	C_{9}H_{10}
Molar mass	118.179 g·mol^{−1}
Appearance	colorless liquid
Boiling point	170–175 °C (338–347 °F; 443–448 K)
- Except where otherwise noted, data are given for materials in their standard state (at 25 °C [77 °F], 100 kPa). Infobox references

4-Vinyltoluene is an organic compound with the formula CH_{3}C_{6}H_{4}CH=CH_{2}. It is derivative of styrene and is used as a comonomer in the production of specialized polystyrenes. It is produced by the dehydrogenation of 4-ethyltoluene. It is also sometimes used in the production of styrene-free polyester resin.
