= Trans-Propenylbenzene =

trans-Propenylbenzene

Names
- Preferred IUPAC name [(E)-Prop-1-enyl]benzene
- Other names trans-β-methylstyrene

Identifiers
CAS Number	873-66-5
3D model (JSmol)	Interactive image
ChemSpider	221082
ECHA InfoCard	100.011.680
EC Number	212-848-0
PubChem CID	252325
RTECS number	DA8400500
UNII	A5S9N1785O
UN number	2618
CompTox Dashboard (EPA)	DTXSID101026543
- InChI: InChI=1S/C9H10/c1-2-6-9-7-4-3-5-8-9/h2-8H,1H3/b6-2+ Key: QROGIFZRVHSFLM-QHHAFSJGSA-N
- SMILES: C(=C/C)\C1=CC=CC=C1

Properties
Chemical formula	C_{9}H_{10}
Molar mass	118.179 g·mol^{−1}
Appearance	colorless liquid
Density	0.911 g/cm^{3}
Melting point	−29.3 °C (−20.7 °F; 243.8 K)
Boiling point	175 °C (347 °F; 448 K)

Hazards
- GHS labelling
Pictograms	(GHS02: Flammable)
Signal word	Warning
Hazard statements	H225, H226
Precautionary statements	P210, P233, P240, P241, P242, P243, P280, P303+P361+P353, P370+P378, P403+P235, P501
- Except where otherwise noted, data are given for materials in their standard state (at 25 °C [77 °F], 100 kPa). Infobox references

trans-Propenylbenzene is an organic compound with the formula C_{6}H_{5}CH=CHCH_{3}. It is the more stable of the two isomers of 1-propenylbenzene. Both isomers are colorless flammable liquids. It is formed by the isomerization of allylbenzene.
