= 1,2,3-Trimethylbenzene =

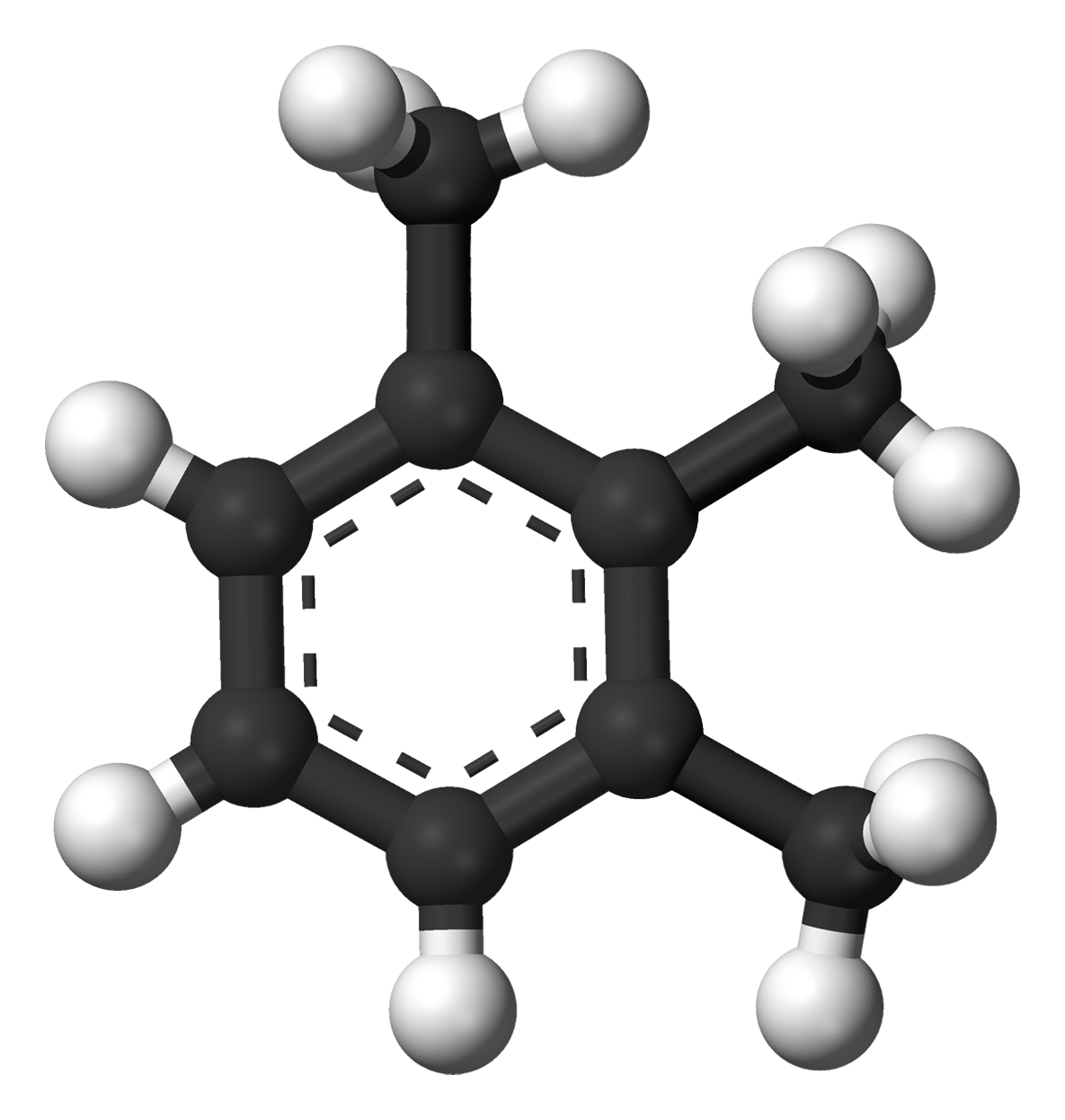

Names
- Preferred IUPAC name 1,2,3-Trimethylbenzene
- Other names Hemellitol; Hemimellitol, Hemimelithol; Hemimellitine; Hemimellitene

Identifiers
CAS Number	526-73-8
3D model (JSmol)	Interactive image
Beilstein Reference	1903410
ChEBI	CHEBI:34037
ChEMBL	ChEMBL1797279
ChemSpider	10236
ECHA InfoCard	100.007.633
EC Number	208-394-8
Gmelin Reference	326517
PubChem CID	10686
RTECS number	DC3300000
UNII	ZK4R7UPH6R
UN number	1993
CompTox Dashboard (EPA)	DTXSID8047769
- InChI: InChI=1S/C9H12/c1-7-5-4-6-8(2)9(7)3/h4-6H,1-3H3 Key: FYGHSUNMUKGBRK-UHFFFAOYSA-N; InChI=1S/C9H12/c1-7-5-4-6-8(2)9(7)3/h4-6H,1-3H3
- SMILES: c1(cccc(c1C)C)C

Properties
Chemical formula	C_{9}H_{12}
Molar mass	120.195 g·mol^{−1}
Appearance	Colorless liquid
Density	0.89 g/mL
Melting point	−25 °C (−13 °F; 248 K)
Boiling point	176 °C (349 °F; 449 K)
Solubility in water	0.006% (20°C)
Vapor pressure	1 mmHg (16.7°C)

Hazards
- Occupational safety and health (OHS/OSH)
Main hazards	Flammable
- GHS labelling
Pictograms	(GHS02: Flammable) (GHS07: Exclamation mark) (GHS08: Health hazard)
Signal word	Warning
Hazard statements	H226, H315, H319, H335
Precautionary statements	P210, P233, P240, P241, P242, P243, P261, P264, P271, P280, P302+P352, P303+P361+P353, P304+P340, P305+P351+P338, P312, P321, P332+P313, P337+P313, P362, P370+P378, P403+P233, P403+P235, P405, P501
Flash point	11 °C; 51 °F; 284 K
Autoignition temperature	243 °C; 470 °F; 516 K
Explosive limits	0.8%-6.6%
- NIOSH (US health exposure limits)
PEL (Permissible)	none
REL (Recommended)	TWA 25 ppm (125 mg/m^{3})
IDLH (Immediate danger)	N.D.
- Except where otherwise noted, data are given for materials in their standard state (at 25 °C [77 °F], 100 kPa). verify (what is ?) Infobox references

1,2,3-Trimethylbenzene is an organic compound with the chemical formula C_{6}H_{3}(CH_{3})_{3}. Classified as an aromatic hydrocarbon, it is a flammable colorless liquid. It is nearly insoluble in water but soluble in organic solvents.

The compound occurs naturally in coal tar and petroleum. It is one of the three isomers of trimethylbenzene. It is used in jet fuel, mixed with other hydrocarbons, to prevent the formation of solid particles which might damage the engine.

German chemist Oscar Jacobsen first prepared the hydrocarbon in 1882 and designated it hemellitol as a reference to the trivial name of hexamethylbenzene. Four years later he also discovered it in the coal tar.

== Production ==
Industrially, it is isolated from the C_{9} aromatic hydrocarbon fraction during petroleum distillation. It is also generated by methylation of toluene and xylenes.
