= C10H14 =

The molecular formula C_{10}H_{14} may refer to:

- C4-Benzenes
  - Butylbenzenes
    - n-Butylbenzene
    - sec-Butylbenzene
    - tert-Butylbenzene
    - Isobutylbenzene
  - Cymenes
    - o-Cymene
    - m-Cymene
    - p-Cymene
  - Diethylbenzenes
    - o-Diethylbenzene
    - m-Diethylbenzene
    - p-Diethylbenzene
  - Tetramethylbenzenes
    - 1,2,3,4-Tetramethylbenzene (prehnitene)
    - 1,2,3,5-Tetramethylbenzene (isodurene)
    - 1,2,4,5-Tetramethylbenzene (durene)
- 1,3-Dehydroadamantane
