= C4-Benzenes =

The C_{4}-benzenes are a class of organic aromatic compounds which contain a benzene ring and four other carbon atoms. There are three tetramethylbenzenes, six dimethylethylbenzenes, three diethylbenzenes, three isopropylmethylbenzenes, three n-propylmethylbenzenes and four butylbenzenes. The saturated compounds have formula C_{10}H_{14} and molecular weight 134.22 g/mol. C_{4}-benzenes are found in petroleum. Petrol (gasoline) can contain 5-8% C_{4}-benzenes.

== Cymenes ==
- o-Cymene
- m-Cymene
- p-Cymene

== Tetramethylbenzenes ==
- Prehnitene
- Isodurene
- Durene

== Other ==
=== Saturated ===
- 1-Ethyl-2,3-dimethylbenzene
- 1-Ethyl-2,4-dimethylbenzene
- 1-Ethyl-2,5-dimethylbenzene
- 1-Ethyl-2,6-dimethylbenzene
- 1-Ethyl-3,4-dimethylbenzene
- 1-Ethyl-3,5-dimethylbenzene
- ortho-diethylbenzene
- meta-diethylbenzene
- para-diethylbenzene
- 1-Propyl-2-methylbenzene
- 1-Propyl-3-methylbenzene
- 1-Propyl-4-methylbenzene
- n-Butylbenzene
- sec-Butylbenzene
- tert-Butylbenzene
- Isobutylbenzene

=== Unsaturated ===
- Divinylbenzene

== Gallery ==
1,2,3,4-Tetramethylbenzene or Prehnitene

1,2,3,5-Tetramethylbenzene or Isodurene

1,2,4,5-Tetramethylbenzene or Durene

1,2-Diethylbenzene

1,3-Diethylbenzene

1,4-Diethylbenzene

o-Cymene

m-Cymene

p-Cymene

n-Butylbenzene

Isobutylbenzene

sec-Butylbenzene

tert-Butylbenzene

Divinylbenzene
