= Alkylbenzene =

Family of organic compounds

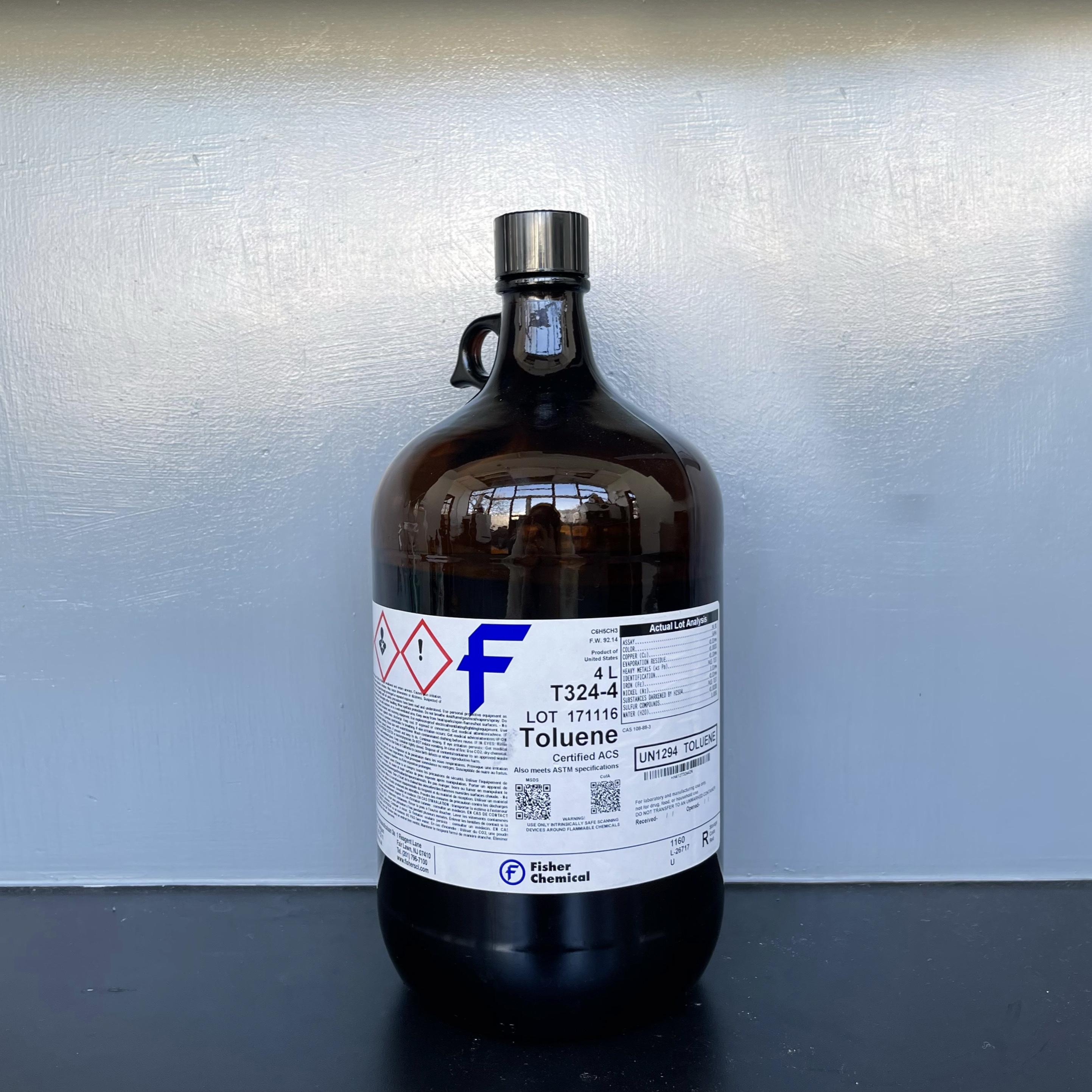
Toluene (or methylbenzene) is a common chemical found in chemistry laboratories.

An alkylbenzene is a chemical compound that contains a monocyclic aromatic ring attaching to one or more saturated hydrocarbon chains. Alkylbenzenes are derivatives of benzene, in which one or more hydrogen atoms are replaced by alkyl groups. The simplest member, toluene (or methylbenzene), has the hydrogen atom of the benzene ring replaced by a methyl group. The chemical formula of alkylbenzenes is C_{n}H_{2n-6}.

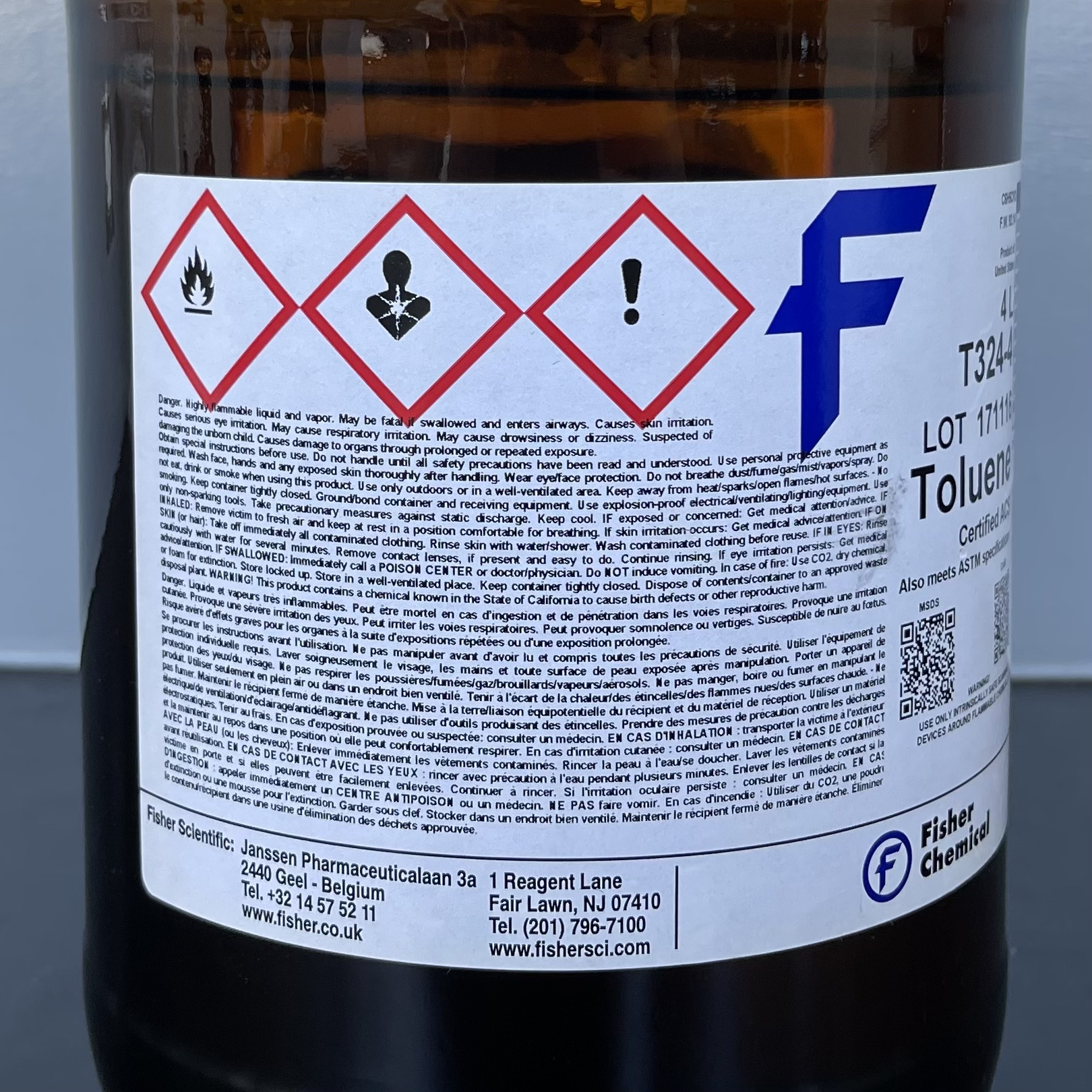
Safety hazards of toluene. Oftentimes, toluene is used as an organic solvent.

Alkylbenzenes are a very important class of hydrocarbons, especially in the synthetic production industry. It is the raw material in the production of synthetic sulfonate detergents, which are found in a variety of household products such as soap, shampoo, toothpaste, laundry detergent, etc. Linear alkylbenzenes (LAB) and branched alkylbenzenes (BAB) are families of alkylbenzene used to prepare synthetic sulfonates. However, LABs are more industrially favoured since the discovery of its extensive biodegradable yield over BAB-based sulfonates in the 1960s.

== Examples ==
Parent compound: Benzene	Alkylbenzenes		
Benzene	Toluene		
Benzene	Xylenes		
Benzene	o-xylene	m-xylene	p-xylene
Benzene	Trimethylbenzenes		
Benzene	hemimellitene	pseudocumene	mesitylene
Benzene	Tetramethylbenzenes		
Benzene	prehnitene	isodurene	durene
Benzene	Miscellaneous		
Benzene	ethylbenzene	cumene	p-cymene

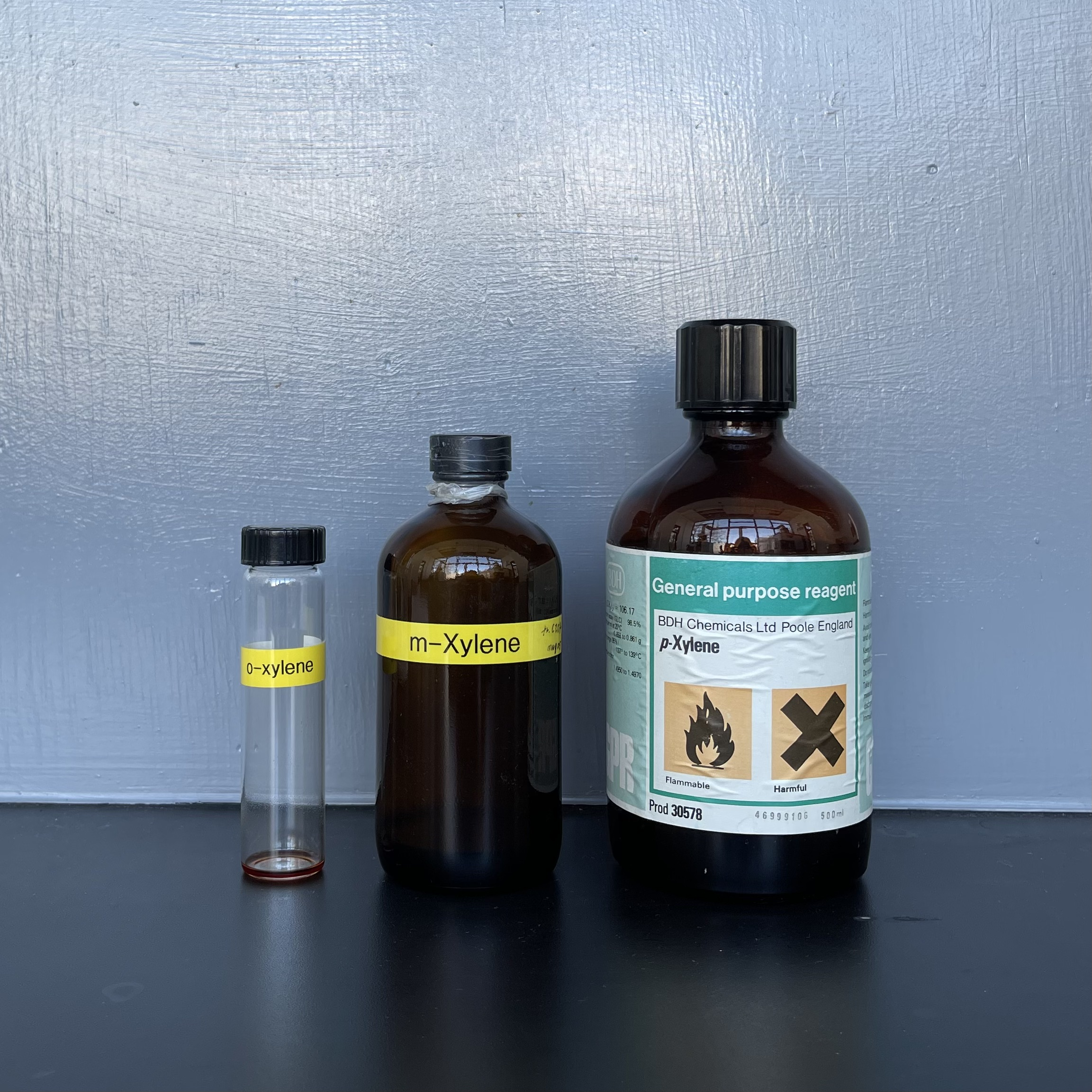
Xylene isomers are also used as solvents in laboratories. Note that in the photo, o-xylene, not being stored in a brown glass bottle, appears to have auto-oxidized.

== Reactions ==
- Friedel-Crafts alkylation: alkylbenzenes can be synthesized from olefins or alkyl halides with aromatic compounds in the presence of a catalyst such as AlCl_{3}, HF, or H_{2}SO_{4}.
- Gattermann-Koch reaction: named after German chemists Ludwig Gattermann and Julius Arnold Koch, the Gattermann-Koch reaction is a catalyzed formylation of alkylbenzenes with carbon monoxide and hydrochloric acid.
- Alkylbenzene sulfonation reaction: electrophilic addition of a sulfonic acid group onto the aromatic ring.

== Spectroscopy ==
Alkylbenzene isomers can be differentiated by observing the position of alkyl substituents on the benzene ring using chemical ionization-proton exchange mass spectrometry. Conventional GC-MS yields limited results because the isomers have identical molecular weight and substituents.

== Production ==
Some alkylbenzenes such as toluene, trimethylbenzenes, and tetramethylbenzenes occur naturally in coal tar oil and as byproducts of the crude oil refinery process. Others can be prepared by Friedel-Crafts alkylation.

Alkylbenzenes used to be synthesized from tetrapropylene, however, the reaction is now rarely used because of the low biodegradable alkylbenzene sulfonates it yields.

== Safety hazards ==
Alkylbenzenes are flammable. Most of them are eye and skin irritants and pose an acute health hazard when ingested. Alkylbenzenes are toxic to aquatic life with long-lasting effects.

== Application ==
=== Synthetic sulfonates ===
Alkylbenzenes are the primary raw material in making synthetic alkylbenzene sulfonates. Synthetic sulfonates are the most widely used detergents, as industrial oil, emulsifiers, demulsifiers, rust inhibitors, dispersants, surfactants for enhanced oil recovery, ore-floatation agents, and wetting agents, among others. LABs such as alkylbenzene, dialkylbenzene, and alkyltoluene are most commonly used to prepare sulfonate detergents.

=== Solvent use ===
Some less substituted alkylbenzenes such as toluene and xylene are commonly used as solvents industrially.

== Literature ==
- Allinger, Cava, de Jongh, Johnson, Lebel, Stevens: Organische Chemie, 1. Auflage, Walter de Gruyter, Berlin 1980, ISBN 3-11-004594-X, pp. 367–368, 560–562.
- Streitwieser / Heathcock: Organische Chemie, 1. Auflage, Verlag Chemie, Weinheim 1980, ISBN 3-527-25810-8, pp. 1051, 1073–1080.
- Beyer / Walter: Lehrbuch der Organischen Chemie, 19. Auflage, S. Hirzel Verlag, Stuttgart 1981, ISBN 3-7776-0356-2, pp. 442–444.
- Morrison / Boyd: Lehrbuch der Organischen Chemie, 3. Auflage, Verlag Chemie, Weinheim 1986, ISBN 3-527-26067-6, pp. 707–728.
