= Syngas to gasoline plus =

Thermochemical process converting gases to fuels

Syngas to gasoline plus (STG+) is a thermochemical process to convert natural gas, other gaseous hydrocarbons or gasified biomass into drop-in fuels, such as gasoline, diesel fuel or jet fuel, and organic solvents.

== Process chemistry ==
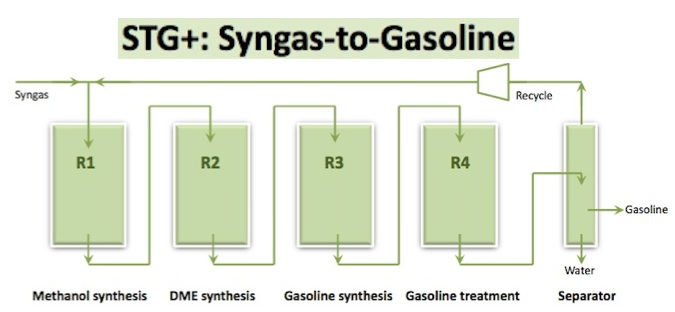
The STG+ Process

This process follows four principal steps in one continuous integrated loop, comprising four fixed bed reactors in a series in which a syngas is converted to synthetic fuels. The steps for producing high-octane synthetic gasoline are as follows:

- Methanol Synthesis: Syngas is fed to Reactor 1, the first of four reactors, which converts most of the syngas to methanol when passing through the catalyst bed.
  CO + 2 H_{2} →
- Dimethyl Ether (DME) Synthesis: The methanol-rich gas from Reactor 1 is next fed to Reactor 2, the second STG+ reactor. The methanol is exposed to a catalyst and much of it is converted to DME, which involves a dehydration from methanol to form DME.
  2 CH_{3}OH → CH_{3}OCH_{3} + H_{2}O
- Gasoline synthesis: The Reactor 2 product gas is next fed to Reactor 3, the third reactor containing the catalyst for conversion of DME to hydrocarbons including paraffins (alkanes), aromatics, naphthenes (cycloalkanes) and small amounts of olefins (alkenes), typically with the carbon number ranging from 6 to 10.
- Gasoline Treatment: The fourth reactor provides transalkylation and hydrogenation treatment to the products coming from Reactor 3. The treatment reduces durene/isodurene (tetramethylbenzenes) and trimethylbenzene components that have high freezing points and must be minimized in gasoline. As a result, the synthetic gasoline product has high octane and desirable viscometric properties.
- Separator: Finally, the mixture from Reactor 4 is condensed to obtain gasoline. The non-condensed gas and gasoline are separated in a conventional condenser/separator. Most of the non-condensed gas from the product separator becomes recycled gas and is sent back to the feed stream to Reactor 1, leaving the synthetic gasoline product composed of paraffins, aromatics and naphthenes.

=== Catalysts ===
The STG+ process uses standard catalysts similar to those used in other gas to liquids technologies, specifically in methanol to gasoline processes. Methanol to gasoline processes favor molecular size- and shape-selective zeolite catalysts, and the STG+ process also utilizes commercially available shape-selective catalysts, such as ZSM-5.

=== Process efficiency ===
According to Primus Green Energy, the STG+ process converts natural gas into 90+-octane gasoline at approximately 5 US gallons per million British thermal units (65 litres per megawatt-hour). The energy content of gasoline is 120,000 to 125,000 British thermal units per US gallon (9.3 to 9.7 kilowatt-hours per litre), making this process about 60% efficient, with a 40% loss of energy.

== Syngas source ==
As is the case with other gas to liquids processes, STG+ utilizes syngas produced via other technologies from a variety of feedstocks, including natural gas, biomass and municipal solid waste.

Natural gas and other methane-rich gases, including those produced from municipal waste, are converted into syngas through methane reforming technologies such as steam methane reforming and auto-thermal reforming.

Biomass gasification technologies are less established, though several systems being developed utilize fixed bed or fluidized bed reactors.

== Comparison to other GTL technologies ==
Other technologies for syngas to liquid fuels synthesis include the Fischer–Tropsch process and the methanol to gasoline processes.

Research conducted at Princeton University indicates that methanol to gasoline processes are consistently more cost-effective, both in capital cost and overall cost, than the Fischer–Tropsch process at small, medium and large scales. Primus Green Energy claims that the STG+ process is more energetically efficient and the highest yielding methanol to gasoline process.

=== Fischer–Tropsch process ===
The primary difference between the Fischer–Tropsch process and methanol to gasoline processes such as STG+ are the catalysts used, product types and economics.

Generally, the Fischer–Tropsch process favors unselective cobalt and iron catalysts, while methanol to gasoline technologies favor molecular size- and shape-selective zeolites. In terms of product types, Fischer–Tropsch yields mainly linear paraffins, such as synthetic crude oil, which requires additional refining to produce fuel products such as diesel fuel or gasoline. Methanol to gasoline processes, on the other hand, can produce aromatics, such as xylene and toluene, and naphthenes and iso-paraffins, such as gasoline and jet fuel.

=== Methanol to gasoline ===
The STG+ technology offers several differentiators that distinguish it from other methanol to gasoline processes. These differences include product flexibility, durene reduction, environmental footprint and capital cost.

Traditional methanol to gasoline technologies produce diesel, gasoline or liquefied petroleum gas. STG+ produces gasoline, diesel, jet fuel and aromatics, depending on the catalysts used. The STG+ technology also incorporates durene reduction into its core process, meaning that the entire fuel production process requires only two steps: syngas production and gas to liquids synthesis. Other methanol to gasoline processes do not incorporate durene reduction into the core process, and they require the implementation of an additional refining step.

Due to the additional number of reactors, traditional methanol to gasoline processes include inefficiencies such as the additional cost and energy loss of condensing and evaporating the methanol prior to feeding it to the durene reduction unit. These inefficiencies can lead to a greater capital cost and environmental footprint than methanol to gasoline processes that use fewer reactors, such as STG+. The STG+ process eliminates multiple condensation and evaporation, and the process converts syngas to liquid transportation fuels directly without producing intermediate liquids. This eliminates the need for storage of two products, including pressure storage for liquefied petroleum gas and storage of liquid methanol.

Simplifying a gas to liquids process by combining multiple steps into fewer reactors leads to increased yield and efficiency, enabling less expensive facilities that are more easily scaled.

== Commercialization ==
The STG+ technology is currently operating at pre-commercial scale in Hillsborough, New Jersey at a plant owned by alternative fuels company Primus Green Energy. The plant produces approximately 100,000 gallons of high-quality, drop-in gasoline per year directly from natural gas. The pre-commercial demonstration plant achieved 720 hours of continuous operation.

Primus Green Energy announced plans to break ground on its first commercial STG+ plant in the second half of 2014, but this did not materialize.

In early 2014, the U.S. Patent and Trademark Office (USPTO) allowed Primus Green Energy’s patent covering its single-loop STG+ technology.

== See also ==
- Alternative fuel
- Biogasoline
- Biomass to liquid
