= Methylpropylbenzene =

Methylpropylbenzene may refer to:

- 1-Methylpropylbenzene
- (2-Methylpropyl)benzene
