= Butylbenzene =

Butylbenzene may refer to:

- n-Butylbenzene
- sec-Butylbenzene
- Isobutylbenzene
- tert-Butylbenzene

== See also ==
- Isobutylbenzene
