= Butanone =

Chemical compound (CH3C(O)CH2CH3)

- Skeletal formula of butanone

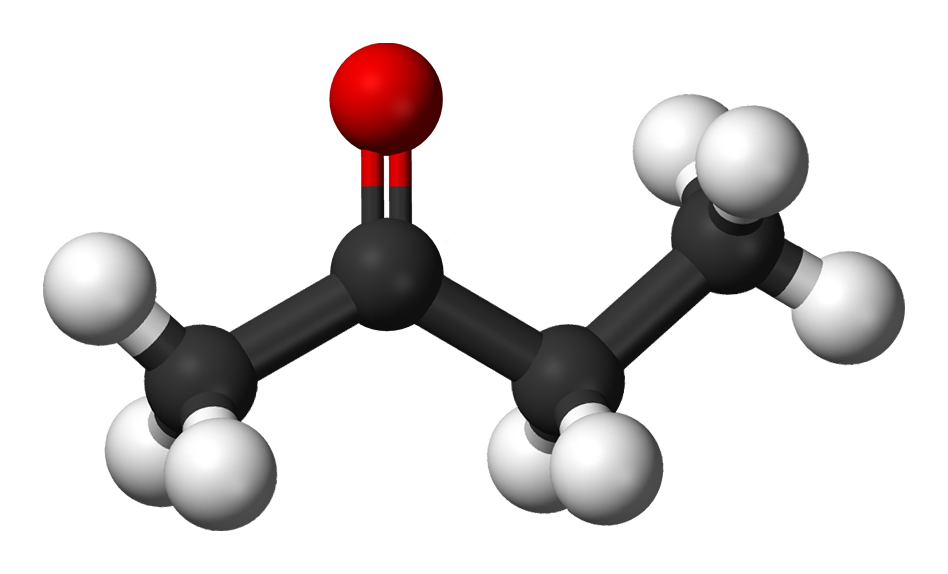
Ball-and-stick model of butanone
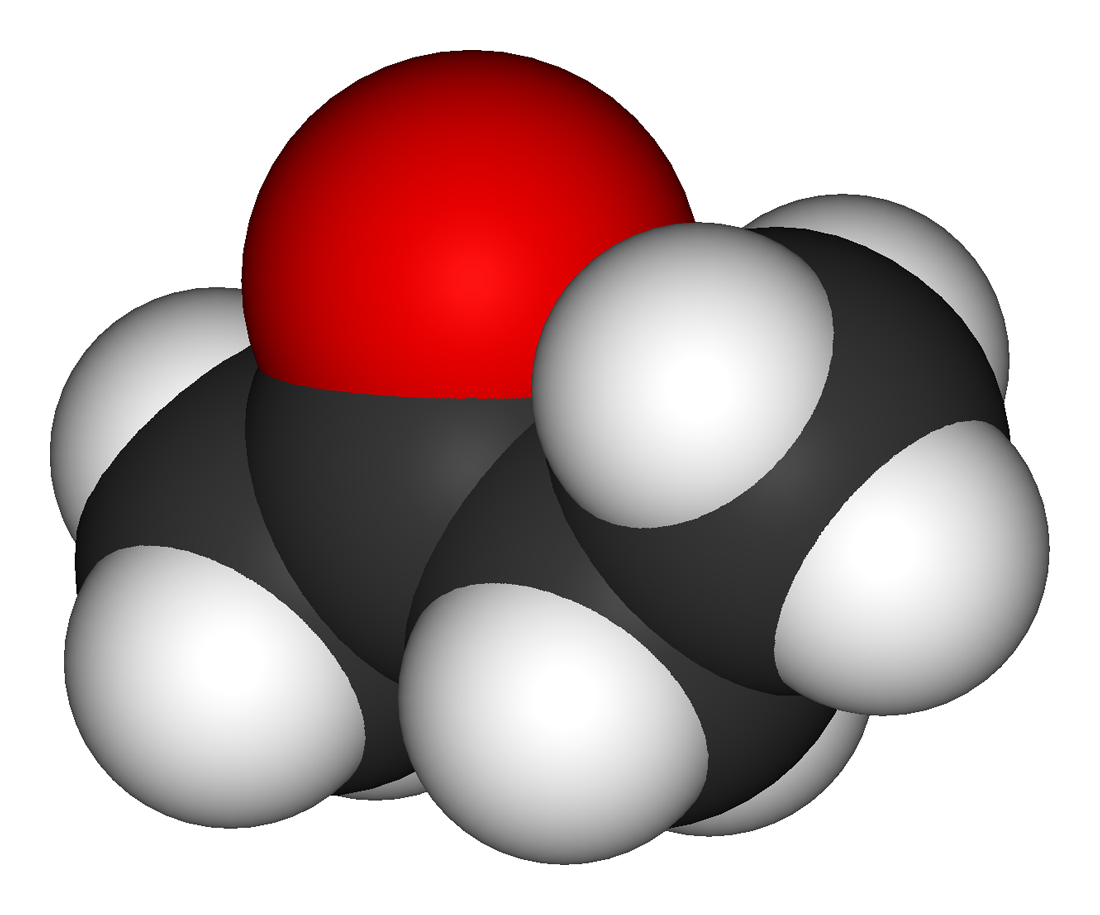
Space-filling model of butanone
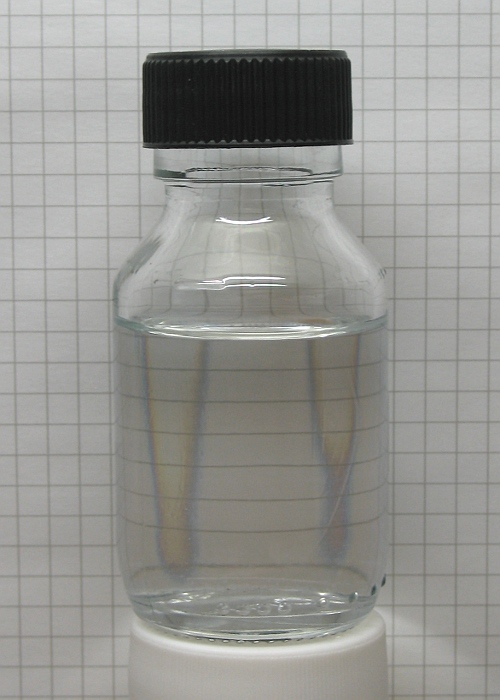
- methyl ethyl ketone

Names
- Preferred IUPAC name Butan-2-one
- Other names: 2-Butanone; Ethyl methyl ketone; Ethylmethylketone; Methyl ethyl ketone (MEK; deprecated); Methylpropanone; Methylacetone

Identifiers
| CAS Number | 78-93-3 |
| 3D model (JSmol) | Interactive image; Interactive image |
| Beilstein Reference | 741880 |
| ChEBI | CHEBI:28398 |
| ChEMBL | ChEMBL15849 |
| ChemSpider | 6321 |
| ECHA InfoCard | 100.001.054 |
| EC Number | 201-159-0 |
| Gmelin Reference | 25656 |
| KEGG | C02845 |
| PubChem CID | 6569 |
| RTECS number | EL6475000 |
| UNII | 6PT9KLV9IO |
| UN number | 1193 |
| CompTox Dashboard (EPA) | DTXSID3021516 |
- InChI: InChI=1S/C4H8O/c1-3-4(2)5/h3H2,1-2H3 Key: ZWEHNKRNPOVVGH-UHFFFAOYSA-N; InChI=1/C4H8O/c1-3-4(2)5/h3H2,1-2H3 Key: ZWEHNKRNPOVVGH-UHFFFAOYAW
- SMILES: O=C(C)CC; CCC(=O)C

Properties
| Chemical formula | C_{4}H_{8}O |
| Molar mass | 72.107 g·mol^{−1} |
| Appearance | Colorless liquid |
| Odor | Mint or acetone-like |
| Density | 0.8050 g/mL |
| Melting point | −86 °C (−123 °F; 187 K) |
| Boiling point | 79.64 °C (175.35 °F; 352.79 K) |
| Solubility in water | 27.5 g/100 mL |
| log P | 0.37 |
| Vapor pressure | 78 mmHg (20 °C) |
| Acidity (pK_{a}) | 14.7 |
| Magnetic susceptibility (χ) | −45.58·10^{−6} cm^{3}/mol |
| Refractive index (n_{D}) | 1.37880 |
| Viscosity | 0.43 cP |

Structure
| Dipole moment | 2.76 D |

Hazards
- GHS labelling
| Pictograms | (GHS02: Flammable) (GHS07: Exclamation mark) |
| Signal word | Danger |
| Hazard statements | H225, H319, H336 |
| Precautionary statements | P210, P233, P240, P241, P242, P243, P261, P264, P271, P280, P303+P361+P353, P304+P340, P305+P351+P338, P312, P337+P313, P370+P378, P403+P233, P403+P235, P405, P501 |
| NFPA 704 (fire diamond) | 1 3 0 |
| Flash point | −9 °C (16 °F; 264 K) |
| Autoignition temperature | 505 °C (941 °F; 778 K) |
| Explosive limits | 1.4–11.4% |
- Lethal dose or concentration (LD, LC)
| LD_{50} (median dose) | 2737 mg/kg (oral, rat); 4050 mg/kg (oral, mouse) |
| LC_{50} (median concentration) | 12667 ppm (mammal); 13333 ppm (mouse, 2 hr); 7833 ppm (rat, 8 hr) |
- NIOSH (US health exposure limits)
| PEL (Permissible) | TWA 200 ppm (590 mg/m^{3}) |
| REL (Recommended) | TWA 200 ppm (590 mg/m^{3}) ST 300 ppm (885 mg/m^{3}) |
| IDLH (Immediate danger) | 3000 ppm |
| Safety data sheet (SDS) | Safety Data Sheet |

Related compounds
| Related ketones | Acetone; 3-Pentanone; 3-Methylbutanone |

Supplementary data page
- Butanone (data page)
- Except where otherwise noted, data are given for materials in their standard state (at 25 °C [77 °F], 100 kPa). verify (what is ?) Infobox references

Butanone, also known as methyl ethyl ketone (MEK) or ethyl methyl ketone, (Note: The international standards group IUPAC has deprecated the term methyl ethyl ketone, and now recommends using ethyl methyl ketone instead.) is an organic compound with the formula CH_{3}C(O)CH_{2}CH_{3}. This colorless liquid ketone has a sharp, sweet odor reminiscent of acetone. It is produced industrially on a large scale, but occurs in nature only in trace amounts. It is partially soluble in water, and is commonly used as an industrial solvent. It is an isomer of another solvent, tetrahydrofuran.

== Production ==
Butanone may be produced by oxidation of 2-butanol. The dehydrogenation of 2-butanol is catalysed by copper, zinc, or bronze:

CH_{3}CH(OH)CH_{2}CH_{3} → CH_{3}C(O)CH_{2}CH_{3} + H_{2}

This is used to produce approximately 700 million kilograms yearly. Other syntheses that have been examined but not implemented include Wacker oxidation of 2-butene and oxidation of isobutylbenzene, which is analogous to the industrial production of acetone. The cumene process can be modified to produce phenol and a mixture of acetone and butanone instead of only phenol and acetone in the original.

Both liquid-phase oxidation of heavy naphtha and the Fischer–Tropsch reaction produce mixed oxygenate streams, from which 2-butanone is extracted by fractionation.

== Applications ==
=== Solvent ===
Butanone is an effective and common solvent and is used in processes involving gums, resins, cellulose acetate and nitrocellulose coatings and in vinyl films. For this reason it finds use in the manufacture of plastics, textiles, in the production of paraffin wax, and in household products such as lacquer, varnishes, paint remover, a denaturing agent for denatured alcohol, glues, and as a cleaning agent. It is a prime component of plumbers' priming fluid, used to clean PVC materials. It has similar solvent properties to acetone but boils at a higher temperature and has a significantly slower evaporation rate. Unlike acetone, it forms an azeotrope with water, making it useful for azeotropic distillation of moisture in certain applications. Butanone is also used in dry erase markers as the solvent of the erasable dye.

The hydroxylamine derivative of butanone is methylethyl ketone oxime (MEKO), which also find use in paints and varnishes as an anti-skinning agent.

=== Plastic welding ===
As butanone dissolves polystyrene and many other plastics, it is sold as "model cement" for use in connecting parts of scale model kits. Though often considered an adhesive, it is functioning as a welding agent in this context.

=== Other uses ===
Butanone is the precursor to methyl ethyl ketone peroxide, which is a catalyst for some polymerization reactions such as crosslinking of unsaturated polyester resins. Dimethylglyoxime can be prepared from butanone first by reaction with ethyl nitrite to give diacetyl monoxime followed by conversion to the dioxime:

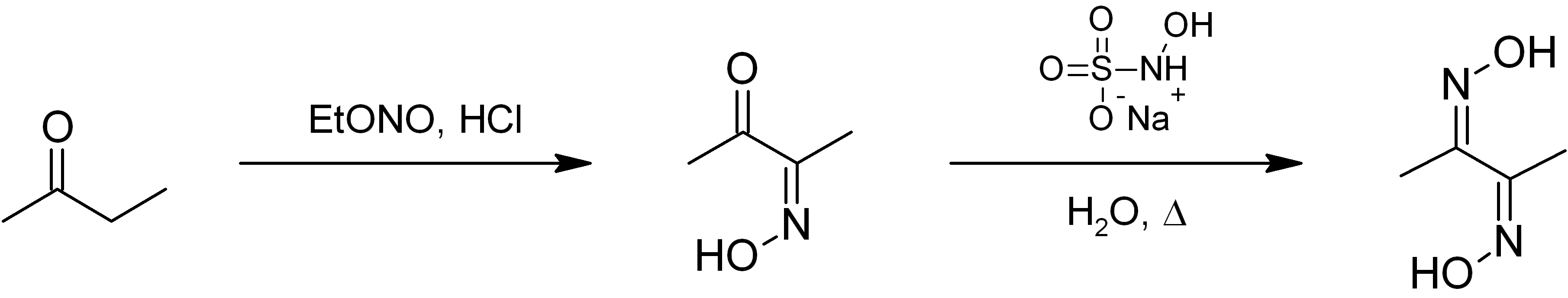

In the peroxide process on producing hydrazine, the starting chemical ammonia is bonded to butanone, oxidized by hydrogen peroxide, bonded to another ammonia molecule.

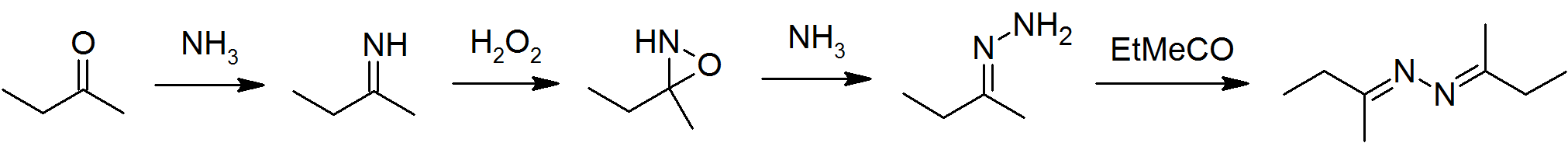

In the final step of the process, hydrolysis produces the desired product, hydrazine, and regenerates the butanone.

Me(Et)C=NN=C(Et)Me + 2 H_{2}O → 2 Me(Et)C=O + N_{2}H_{4}

== Safety ==
=== Flammability ===
Butanone can react with most oxidizing materials and can produce fires. It is moderately explosive, requiring only a small flame or spark to cause a vigorous reaction. The vapor is heavier than air, so it can accumulate at low points. It is explosive at concentrations between 1.4 and 11.4%. Concentrations in the air high enough to be flammable are intolerable to humans due to the irritating nature of the vapor. Butanone fires should be extinguished with carbon dioxide, dry agents, or alcohol-resistant foam.

The ignition of butanone vapor was the proximate cause of the 2007 Xcel Energy Cabin Creek fire, resulting in the deaths of five workers in a hydroelectric penstock. After the incident, the U.S. Chemical Safety and Hazard Investigation Board specifically noted the danger posed by butanone in confined spaces, and suggested 1,1,1-trichloroethane or limonene as safer alternatives.

=== Health effects ===
Butanone is a constituent of tobacco smoke. It is an irritant, causing irritation to the eyes and nose of humans. Serious animal health effects have been seen only at very high levels. There are no long-term studies with animals breathing or drinking it, and no studies for carcinogenicity in animals breathing or drinking it. There is some evidence that butanone can potentiate the toxicity of other solvents, in contrast to the calculation of mixed solvent exposures by simply adding exposures.

As of 2010, the United States Environmental Protection Agency (EPA) listed butanone as a toxic chemical. There are reports of neuropsychological effects. It is rapidly absorbed through undamaged skin and lungs. It contributes to the formation of ground-level ozone, which is toxic in low concentrations.

=== Regulation ===
Butanone is listed as a Table II precursor under the United Nations Convention Against Illicit Traffic in Narcotic Drugs and Psychotropic Substances.

Emission of butanone was regulated in the US as a hazardous air pollutant, because it is a volatile organic compound contributing to the formation of tropospheric (ground-level) ozone. In 2005, the US Environmental Protection Agency removed butanone from the list of hazardous air pollutants (HAPs).

== See also ==
- Butyraldehyde
- Butane
- n-Butanol
- 2-Butanol
