= P-Menthane =

p-Menthane

Names
- IUPAC name 1-isopropyl-4-methylcyclohexane

Identifiers
CAS Number	99-82-1
3D model (JSmol)	Interactive image
ChemSpider	7179
ECHA InfoCard	100.002.537
EC Number	202-790-4
PubChem CID	7459
UNII	CGW5GN8TXU
CompTox Dashboard (EPA)	DTXSID9025530
- InChI: InChI=1S/C10H20/c1-8(2)10-6-4-9(3)5-7-10/h8-10H,4-7H2,1-3H3 Key: CFJYNSNXFXLKNS-UHFFFAOYSA-N
- SMILES: CC1CCC(CC1)C(C)C

Properties
Chemical formula	C_{10}H_{20}
Molar mass	140.270 g·mol^{−1}
Appearance	Colorless liquid
Density	0.8086 g/cm^{3}
Boiling point	168 °C (334 °F; 441 K)
Solubility in organic solvents	Soluble
- Except where otherwise noted, data are given for materials in their standard state (at 25 °C [77 °F], 100 kPa). Infobox references

p-Menthane is a hydrocarbon with the formula (CH_{3})_{2}CHC_{6}H_{10}CH_{3}. It is the product of the hydrogenation or hydrogenolysis of various terpenoids, including p-cymene, terpinolenes, phellandrene, and limonene. It is a colorless liquid with a fragrant fennel-like odor. It occurs naturally, especially in exudates of Eucalyptus fruits. The compound is generally encountered as a mixture of the cis and trans isomers, which have very similar properties
