= Duroquinone =

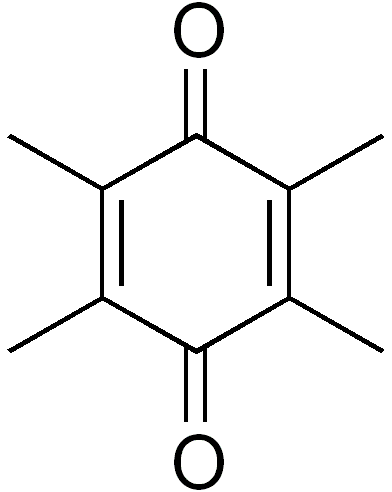

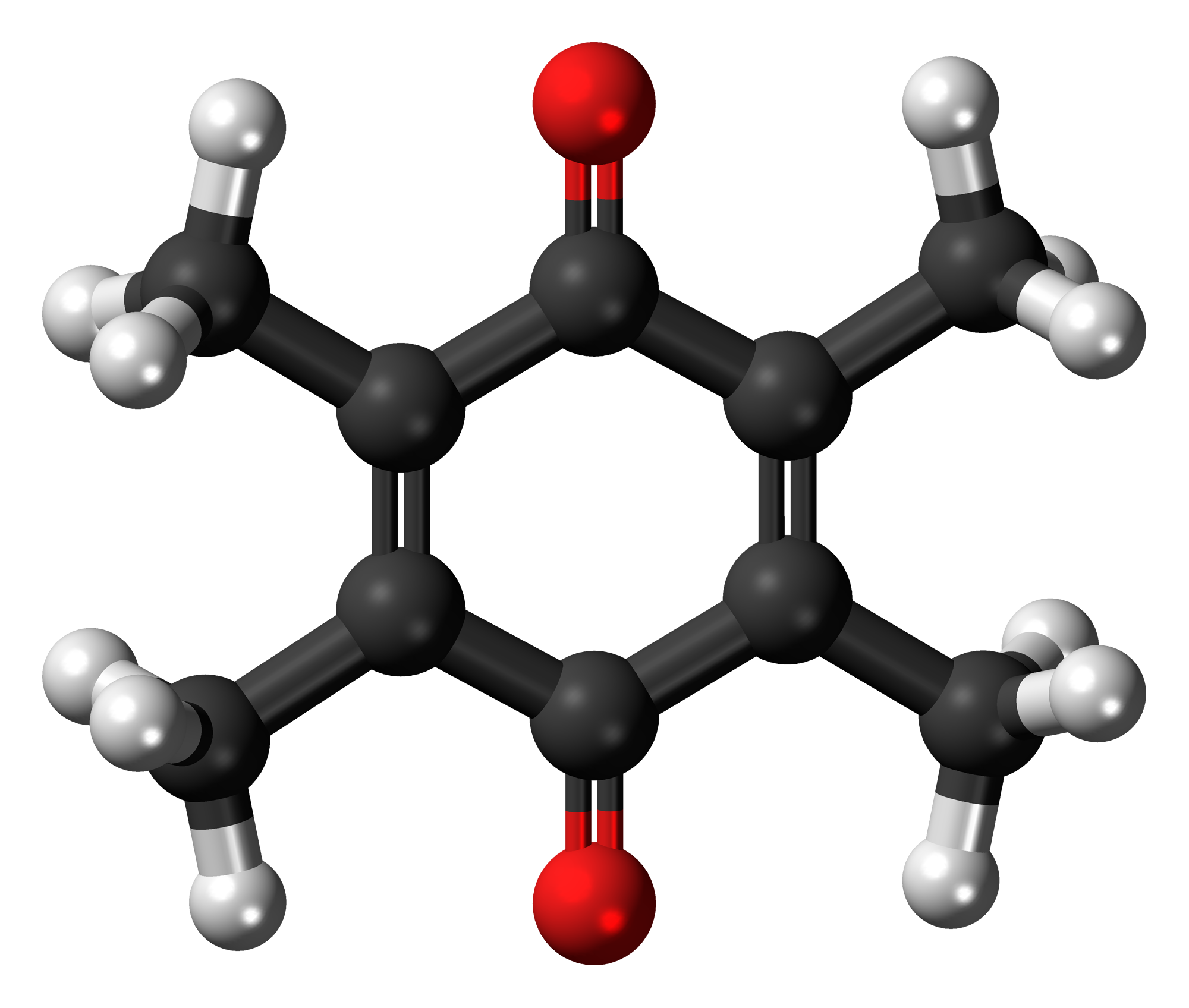

Names
- Preferred IUPAC name 2,3,5,6-Tetramethylcyclohexa-2,5-diene-1,4-dione
- Other names 2,3,5,6-Tetramethyl-1,4-benzoquinone; Tetramethyl-p-benzoquinone

Identifiers
CAS Number	527-17-3
3D model (JSmol)	Interactive image
Beilstein Reference	1909128
ChEBI	CHEBI:42023
ChEMBL	ChEMBL151604
ChemSpider	61539
DrugBank	DB01927
ECHA InfoCard	100.007.646
EC Number	208-409-8
Gmelin Reference	279610
PubChem CID	68238
UNII	X0Q8791R69
CompTox Dashboard (EPA)	DTXSID50200659
- InChI: InChI=1S/C10H12O2/c1-5-6(2)10(12)8(4)7(3)9(5)11/h1-4H3 Key: WAMKWBHYPYBEJY-UHFFFAOYSA-N; InChI=1/C10H12O2/c1-5-6(2)10(12)8(4)7(3)9(5)11/h1-4H3 Key: WAMKWBHYPYBEJY-UHFFFAOYAK
- SMILES: CC1=C(C(=O)C(=C(C1=O)C)C)C

Properties
Chemical formula	C_{10}H_{12}O_{2}
Molar mass	164.20408 g/mol
Melting point	109 to 114 °C (228 to 237 °F; 382 to 387 K)

Hazards
- GHS labelling
Pictograms	(GHS07: Exclamation mark)
Signal word	Warning
Hazard statements	H315, H319, H335
Precautionary statements	P261, P264, P271, P280, P302+P352, P304+P340, P305+P351+P338, P312, P321, P332+P313, P337+P313, P362, P403+P233, P405, P501
- Except where otherwise noted, data are given for materials in their standard state (at 25 °C [77 °F], 100 kPa). verify (what is ?) Infobox references

Duroquinone is an organic oxidant (C_{6}(CH_{3})_{4}O_{2}). It is related to 1,4-benzoquinone by replacement of four H centres with methyl (Me) groups. The C_{10}O_{2} core of this molecule is planar with two pairs of C=O and C=C bonds.

The compound is produced via nitration of durene (1,2,4,5-tetramethylbenzene) followed reduction to the diamine and then oxidation.

A derived organoiron compound (η^{2},η^{2}-C_{6}(CH_{3})_{4}O_{2})Fe(CO)_{3} is obtained by the carbonylation of 2-butyne in the presence of iron pentacarbonyl.

The molecule has been mentioned in the popular press as a component of a "nano brain".

Duroquinone was observed in a degradation products generated from pyrolysis of α-Tocopheryl acetate.
