= Diacetyl monoxime =

Names
- Other names BDM, Biacetyl monoxime, 2,3-butanedione monoxime

Identifiers
CAS Number	17019-25-9
3D model (JSmol)	Interactive image
ChEBI	CHEBI:4480
ChEMBL	ChEMBL1255578
ChemSpider	4917792
ECHA InfoCard	100.000.316
EC Number	200-348-5
KEGG	C07509
PubChem CID	6409633
UNII	19SQ93LM6H
CompTox Dashboard (EPA)	DTXSID7024669
- InChI: InChI=1S/C4H7NO2/c1-3(5-7)4(2)6/h7H,1-2H3/b5-3+ Key: FSEUPUDHEBLWJY-HWKANZROSA-N
- SMILES: CC(=NO)C(=O)C

Properties
Chemical formula	C_{4}H_{7}NO_{2}
Molar mass	101.105 g·mol^{−1}
Appearance	white solid
Melting point	75–78 °C (167–172 °F; 348–351 K)
Boiling point	185–186 °C (365–367 °F; 458–459 K)

Hazards
- GHS labelling
Pictograms	(GHS07: Exclamation mark)
Signal word	Warning
Hazard statements	H302, H312, H315, H319, H332, H335
Precautionary statements	P261, P264, P270, P271, P280, P301+P312, P302+P352, P304+P312, P304+P340, P305+P351+P338, P312, P321, P322, P330, P332+P313, P337+P313, P362, P363, P403+P233, P405, P501
- Except where otherwise noted, data are given for materials in their standard state (at 25 °C [77 °F], 100 kPa). Infobox references

Diacetyl monoxime is a chemical compound described by the formula CH_{3}C(O)C(NOH)CH_{3}. This colourless solid is the monooxime derivative of the diketone butane-2,3-dione (also known as diacetyl and biacetyl). Its biological effects include inhibiting certain ATPases.

== Preparation ==
The compound can be prepared from butanone by reaction with ethyl nitrite. It is an intermediate in the preparation of dimethylglyoxime:

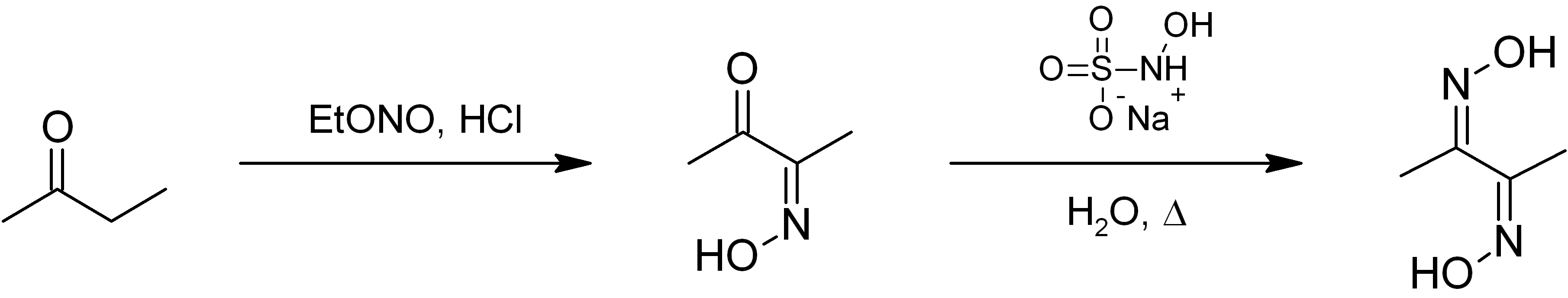

== Uses ==
Diacetyl monoxime can be used with thiosemicarbazide to selectively detect small amounts of urea in the presence of other nitrogen-containing compounds.
