= Butanone (data page) =

Chemical data page

This page provides supplementary chemical data on butanone.

== Material Safety Data Sheet ==
The handling of this chemical may incur notable safety precautions. It is highly recommend that you seek the Material Safety Datasheet (MSDS) for this chemical from a reliable source and follow its directions.

- SIRI
- Fisher Scientific
- Science Stuff

== Structure and properties ==
Structure and properties
Index of refraction, n_{D}	1.3807 at 15.9 °C
Abbe number	32
Dielectric constant, ε_{r}	18.5 ε_{0} at 20 °C
Bond strength	2.67 pa
Bond length	r.
Bond angle	?
Magnetic susceptibility	?
Surface tension	23.9 dyn/cm at 25 °C
Viscosity	0.5429 mPa·s at 0 °C; 0.4284 mPa·s at 20 °C; 0.3490 mPa·s at 40 °C; 0.2482 mPa·s at 80 °C

== Thermodynamic properties ==
Phase behavior
Triple point	186.5 K (–86.5 °C), ? Pa
Critical point	533 K (260 °C), 4.002 MPa
Std enthalpy change of fusion, Δ_{fus}H^{~~o~~}	8.44 kJ/mol
Std entropy change of fusion, Δ_{fus}S^{~~o~~}	44.98 J/(mol·K)
Std enthalpy change of vaporization, Δ_{vap}H^{~~o~~}	32.2 kJ/mol
Std entropy change of vaporization, Δ_{vap}S^{~~o~~}	91.6 J/(mol·K)
Solid properties
Std enthalpy change of formation, Δ_{f}H^{~~o~~}_{solid}	? kJ/mol
Standard molar entropy, S^{~~o~~}_{solid}	? J/(mol K)
Heat capacity, c_{p}	? J/(mol K)
Liquid properties
Std enthalpy change of formation, Δ_{f}H^{~~o~~}_{liquid}	–273.3 kJ/mol
Standard molar entropy, S^{~~o~~}_{liquid}	239.0 J/(mol K)
Enthalpy of combustion, Δ_{c}H^{~~o~~}	–2444.2 kJ/mol
Heat capacity, c_{p}	158.4 J/(mol K)
Gas properties
Std enthalpy change of formation, Δ_{f}H^{~~o~~}_{gas}	–238.5 kJ/mol
Standard molar entropy, S^{~~o~~}_{gas}	310 J/(mol K)
Heat capacity, c_{p}	101.68 J/(mol K) at 25 °C

== Vapor pressure of liquid ==
P in mm Hg	1	10	40	100	400	760
T in °C	–48.3	–17.7	6.0	25.0	60.0	79.6

Table data obtained from CRC Handbook of Chemistry and Physics 44th ed.

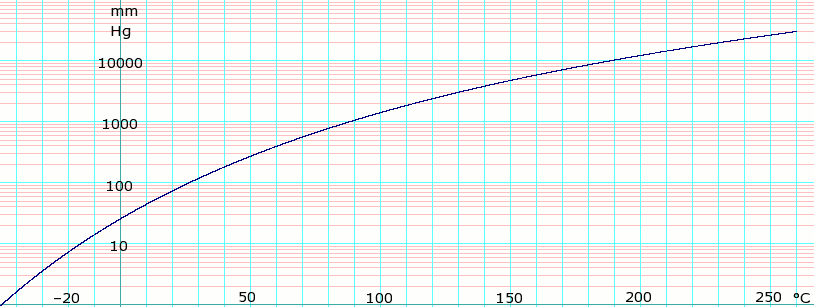
log of Butanone vapor pressure. Uses formula: $\scriptstyle\log_e P_{mmHg} = \log_e (\frac {760} {101.325}) -7.783651 \log_e(T+273.15) - \frac {6160.169} {T+273.15} + 66.97868 + 6.139268 \times 10^{-6} (T+273.15)^2$ obtained from CHERIC

== Spectral data ==
UV-Vis
λ_{max}	? nm
Extinction coefficient, ε	?
IR
Major absorption bands	? cm^{−1}
NMR
Proton NMR
Carbon-13 NMR
Other NMR data
MS
Masses of main fragments
