= Nickel bis(dimethylglyoximate) =

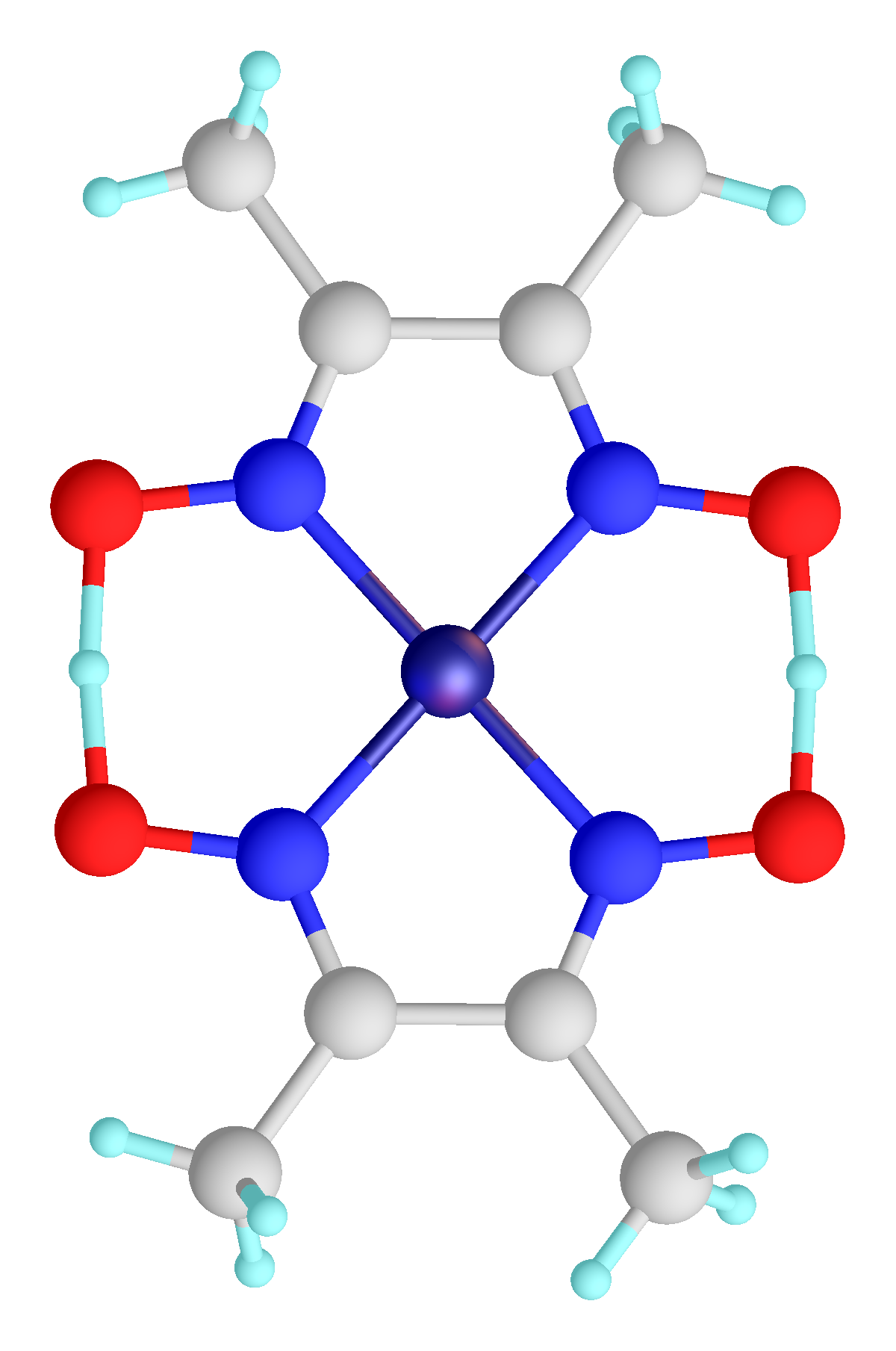

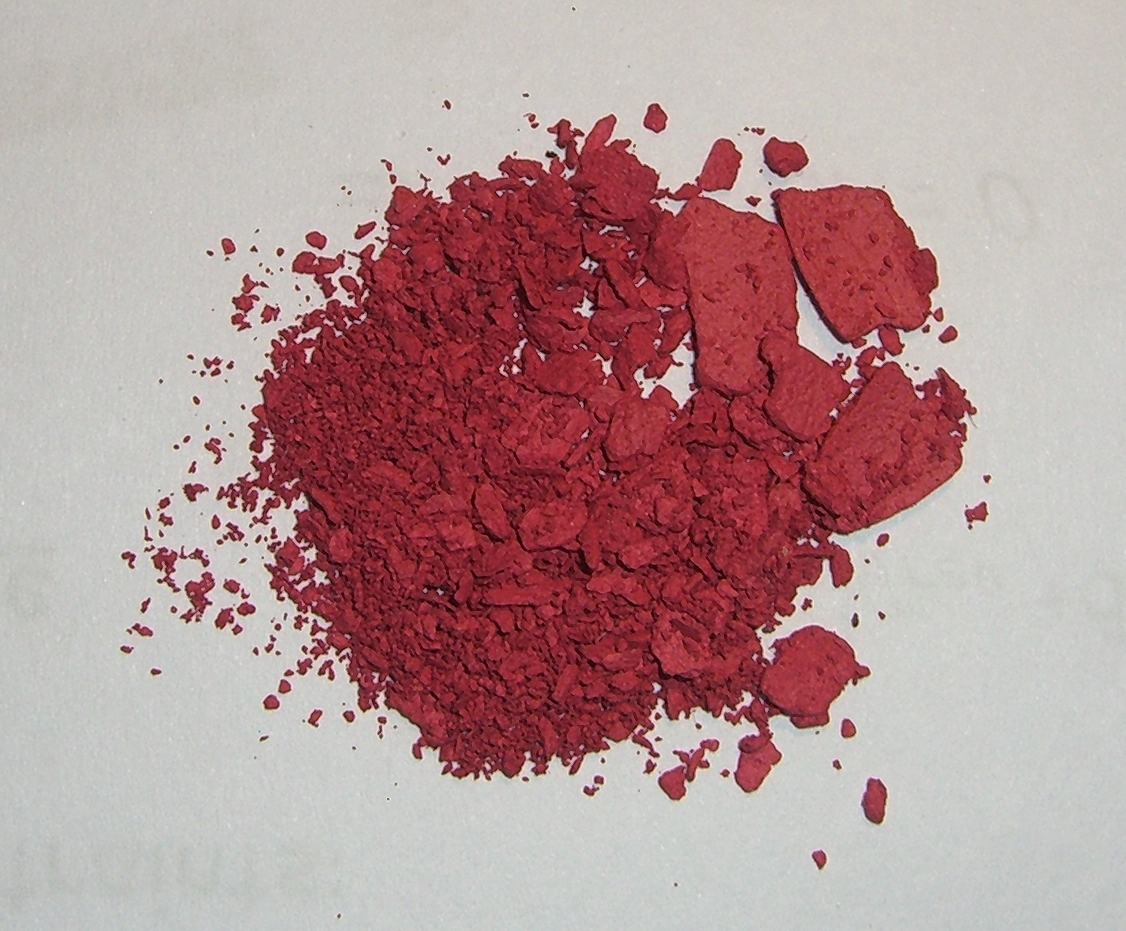

Names
- IUPAC name nickel;N-[(Z)-3-nitrosobut-2-en-2-yl]hydroxylamine
- Other names Bis(butanedione dioximato)nickel

Identifiers
CAS Number	13478-93-8
3D model (JSmol)	Interactive image
ChemSpider	4584372
EC Number	236-782-7
PubChem CID	5475696
UNII	7CZ5340YUM
- InChI: InChI=1S/2C4H8N2O2.Ni/c2*1-3(5-7)4(2)6-8;/h2*5,7H,1-2H3;/b2*4-3-; Key: CNOULSXJEKYGTK-FDGPNNRMSA-N
- SMILES: CC(=C(C)N=O)NO.CC(=C(C)N=O)NO.[Ni]

Properties
Chemical formula	C_{8}H_{14}N_{4}NiO_{4}
Molar mass	288.917 g·mol^{−1}
Appearance	red solid
Density	1.698 g/cm^{3}

Hazards
- GHS labelling
Pictograms	(GHS07: Exclamation mark) (GHS08: Health hazard)
Signal word	Warning
Hazard statements	H315, H317, H319, H335, H351
Precautionary statements	P201, P202, P261, P264, P271, P272, P280, P281, P302+P352, P304+P340, P305+P351+P338, P308+P313, P312, P321, P332+P313, P333+P313, P337+P313, P362, P363, P403+P233, P405, P501
- Except where otherwise noted, data are given for materials in their standard state (at 25 °C [77 °F], 100 kPa). Infobox references

Nickel bis(dimethylglyoximate) is the coordination complex with the formula Ni[ONC(CH_{3})C(CH_{3})NOH]_{2}. The compound is a bright red solid. It achieved prominence for its use in the qualitative analysis of nickel.

== Structure ==
The geometry of the nickel(II) ion is square planar. It is surrounded by two equivalents of the conjugate base (dmgH^{−}) of dimethylglyoxime (dmgH_{2}). The pair of organic ligands are joined through hydrogen bonds to give a macrocyclic ligand. The complex is distinctively colored and insoluble leading to its use as a chelating agent in the gravimetric analysis of nickel.

The use of dimethylglyoxime as a reagent to detect nickel was reported by L. A. Chugaev in 1905.

This reaction is fairly selective thanks to the ionic radius of nickel allowing the compact stacking of Ni(dmgH)_{2} in lattice, causing substantially more pronounced insolubility compared to complexes of dmg with other metals.
