= Dimethylglyoxime =

- Dimethylglyoxime

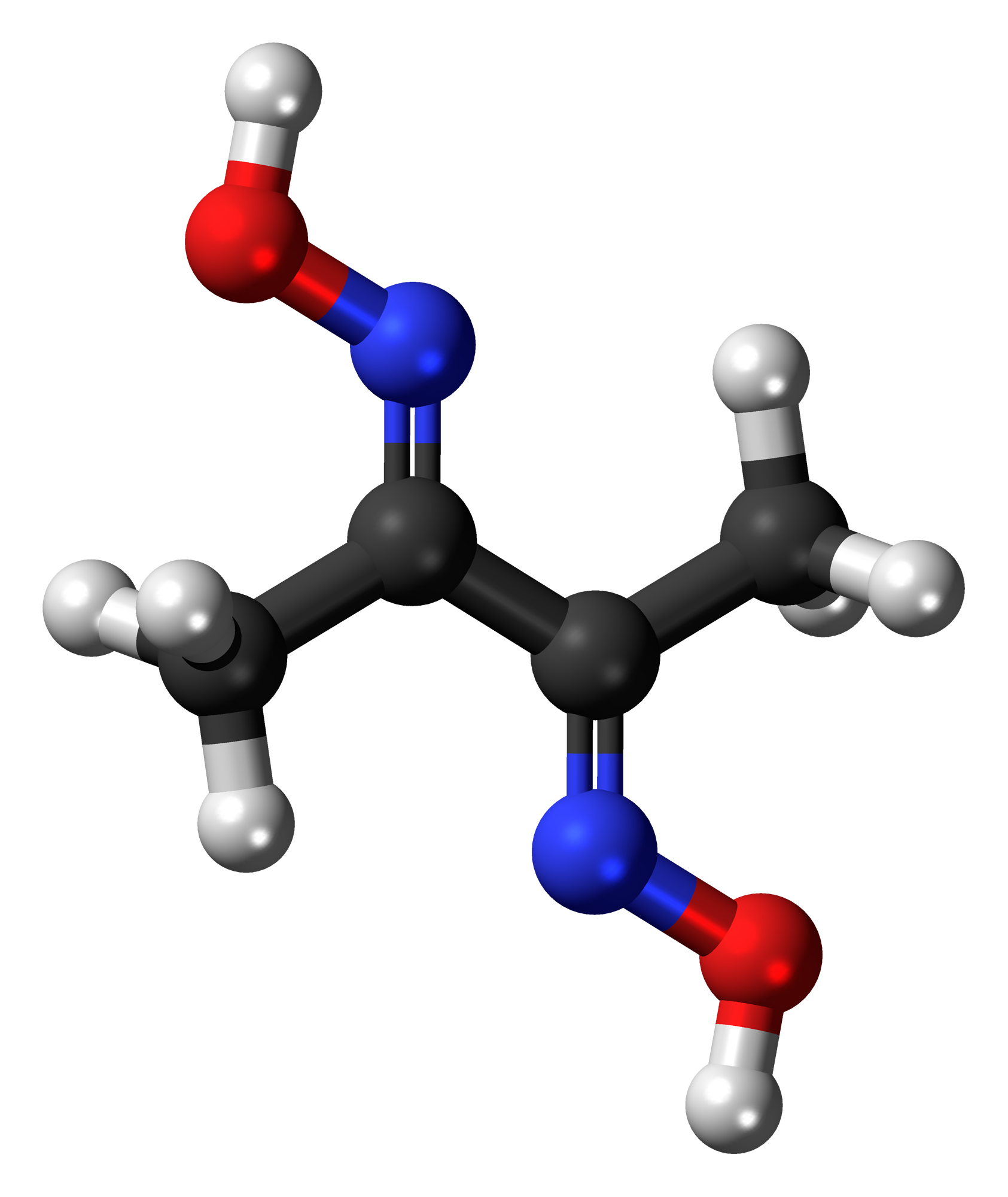

Names
- IUPAC name N,N′-Dihydroxy-2,3-butanediimine
- Other names: Dimethylglyoxime; Diacetyl dioxime; Butane-2,3-dioxime; Chugaev's reagent

Identifiers
CAS Number	95-45-4; 17117-97-4 (E)
3D model (JSmol)	Interactive image
ChEMBL	ChEMBL3184098
ChemSpider	10606175
ECHA InfoCard	100.002.201
EC Number	202-420-1
PubChem CID	135399895
RTECS number	EK2975000
UNII	2971MFT1KY
CompTox Dashboard (EPA)	DTXSID2044393
- InChI: InChI=1S/C4H8N2O2/c1-3(5-7)4(2)6-8/h7-8H,1-2H3/b5-3-,6-4+ Key: JGUQDUKBUKFFRO-CIIODKQPSA-N; InChI=1/C4H8N2O2/c1-3(5-7)4(2)6-8/h7-8H,1-2H3/b5-3-,6-4+ Key: JGUQDUKBUKFFRO-CIIODKQPBA
- SMILES: C\C(=N\O)\C(\C)=N\O

Properties
Chemical formula	C_{4}H_{8}N_{2}O_{2}
Molar mass	116.120 g·mol^{−1}
Appearance	White/Off White Powder
Density	1.37 g/cm^{3}
Melting point	240 to 241 °C (464 to 466 °F; 513 to 514 K)
Boiling point	decomposes
Solubility in water	low

Structure
Dipole moment	0

Hazards
- Occupational safety and health (OHS/OSH)
Main hazards	Toxic, Skin/Eye Irritant
- GHS labelling
Pictograms	(GHS02: Flammable) (GHS06: Toxic)
Signal word	Danger
Hazard statements	H228, H301
Precautionary statements	P210, P240, P241, P264, P270, P280, P301+P310, P321, P330, P370+P378, P405, P501
NFPA 704 (fire diamond)	2
Safety data sheet (SDS)	External MSDS

Related compounds
Related compounds	Hydroxylamine salicylaldoxime
- Except where otherwise noted, data are given for materials in their standard state (at 25 °C [77 °F], 100 kPa). verify (what is ?) Infobox references

Dimethylglyoxime is a chemical compound described by the formula CH_{3}C(NOH)C(NOH)CH_{3}. Its abbreviation is dmgH_{2} for neutral form, and dmgH^{−} for anionic form, where H stands for hydrogen. This colourless solid is the dioxime derivative of the diketone butane-2,3-dione (also known as diacetyl). DmgH_{2} is used in the analysis of palladium or nickel. Its coordination complexes are of theoretical interest as models for enzymes and as catalysts. Many related ligands can be prepared from other diketones, e.g. benzil.

== Preparation and reactions ==
Dimethylglyoxime can be prepared from butanone first by reaction with ethyl nitrite to give biacetyl monoxime. The second oxime is installed using sodium hydroxylamine monosulfonate:

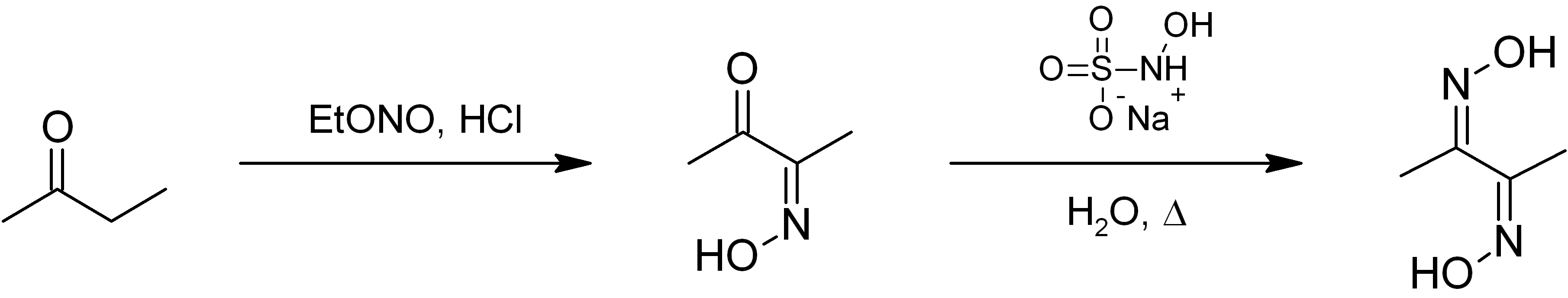

2,3-Butanediamine is produced by reduction of dimethylglyoxime with lithium aluminium hydride.

== Complexes ==
Dimethylglyoxime forms complexes with metals including nickel, palladium and cobalt. These complexes are used to separate those cations from solutions of metal salts and in gravimetric analysis. It is also used in precious metals refining to precipitate palladium from solutions of palladium chloride.

Dimethylglyoxime Complexes
Reaction of Ni-dmg-Formation

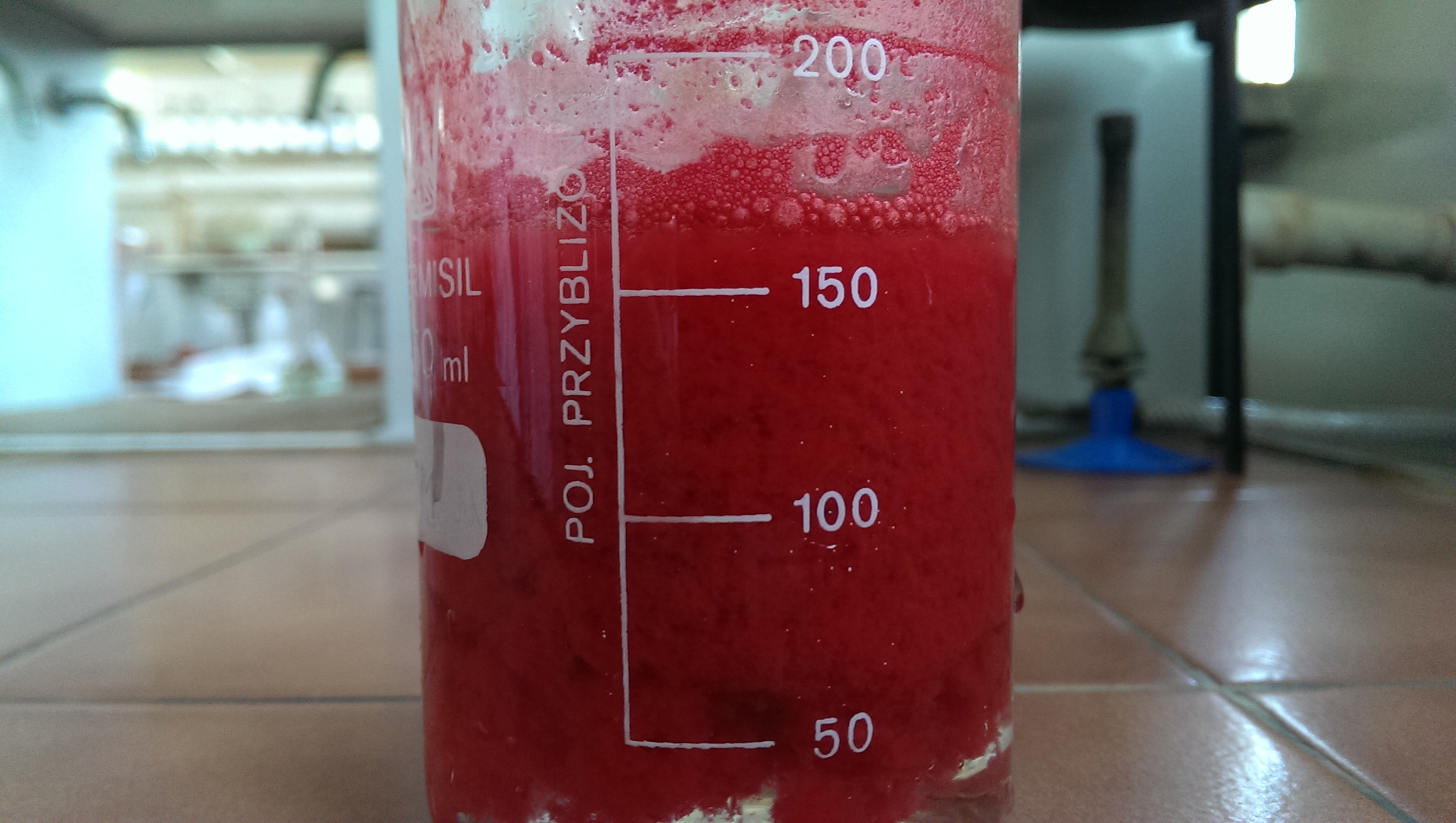
Sample of Ni(dmgH)_{2}

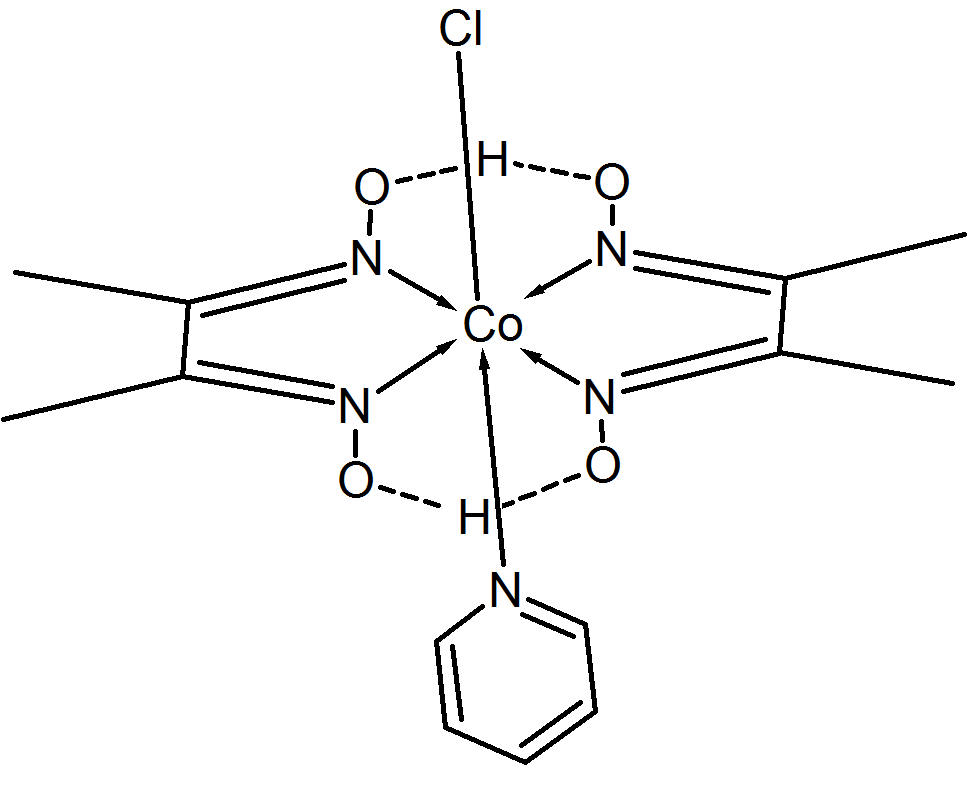
Structure of chloro(pyridine)cobaloxime
