= Cymene =

Group of chemical compounds

Cymene describes organic compounds with the formula C_{10}H_{14}, condensed formula CH_{3}C_{6}H_{4}CH(CH_{3})_{2}. Three isomers exist: 1,2- 1,3-, and 1,4-. All are colorless liquids, immiscible in water, with similar boiling points. They are classified as aromatic hydrocarbons. They bear two substituents: an isopropyl (CH(CH_{3})_{2}) group and a methyl group.

Cymenes
Name	o-Cymene	m-Cymene	p-Cymene
Structural formula			
CAS number	527-84-4	535-77-3	99–87–6
melting point (°C)	−71.54	−63.75	−67.94
boiling point (°C)	178.15	175.05	177.10

== Production and reactions ==
m- and p-Cymene are prepared by alkylation of toluene with propylene:

CH_{3}C_{6}H_{5} + 2 CH_{3}CH=CH_{2} → CH_{3}C_{6}H_{4}CH(CH_{3})_{2}

These alkylations are catalyzed by various Lewis acids, such as aluminium trichloride.

m- and p-Cymene are mainly of interest as precursors to the respective cresols, which exploits the Hock rearrangements.
