= Demulsifier =

Chemical used to separate emulsions

Demulsifiers, or emulsion breakers, are a class of specialty chemicals used to separate emulsions, for example, water in oil. They are commonly used in the processing of crude oil, which is typically produced along with significant quantities of saline water. This water (and salt) must be removed from the crude oil prior to refining. If the majority of the water and salt are not removed, significant corrosion problems can occur in the refining process.

Demulsifiers are typically based on the following chemistry:

- Acid catalysed phenol-formaldehyde resins
- Base catalysed phenol-formaldehyde resins
- Epoxy resins
- Polyethyleneimines
- Polyamines
- Di-epoxides
- Polyols
- dendrimer

The above are usually ethoxylated (and/or propoxylated) to provide the desired degree of water/oil solubility. The addition of ethylene oxide increases water solubility, propylene oxide decreases it.

Commercially available demulsifier formulations are typically a mixture of two to four different chemistries, in carrier solvent(s) such as xylene, heavy aromatic naphtha (HAN), Isopropanol, methanol, 2-Ethylhexanol or diesel.

== Manufacturers ==
Demulsifiers are manufactured by chemical manufacturers including:

- Arkema
- Baker Hughes
- BASF
- ChampionX
- Clariant
- Dow Chemical Company
- Lubrizol
- Nouryon
- PureChem Services (CES)
- SI Group
- Chembiotec Additives
- Solvay
- Stepan
- Starborn Chemical
- Dorf Ketal Chemicals
