= Divinylbenzene =

Organic compound, C6H4(CH=CH2)2

- Skeletal formulae of both isomers

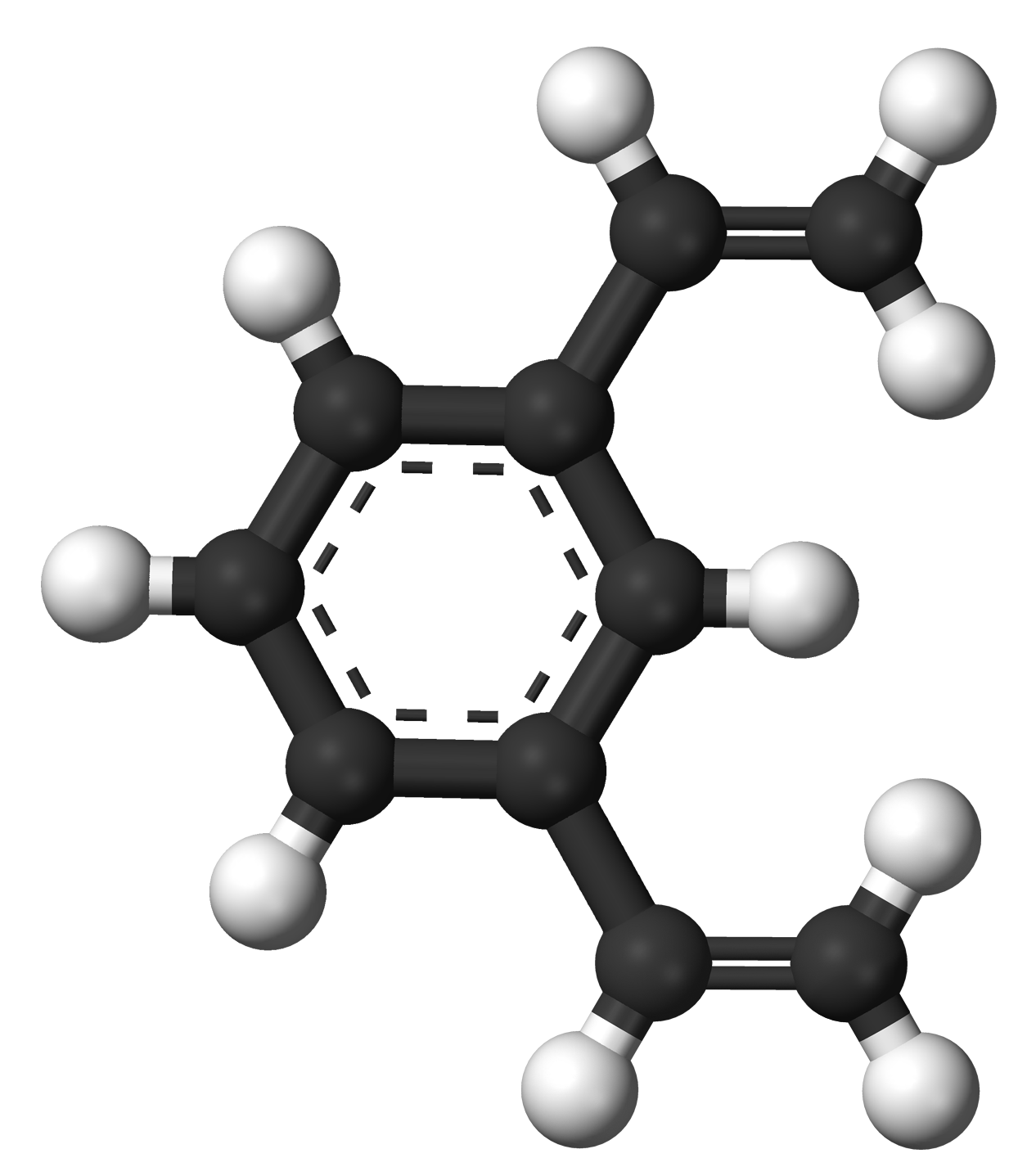
Ball-and-stick model of m-Divinylbenzene
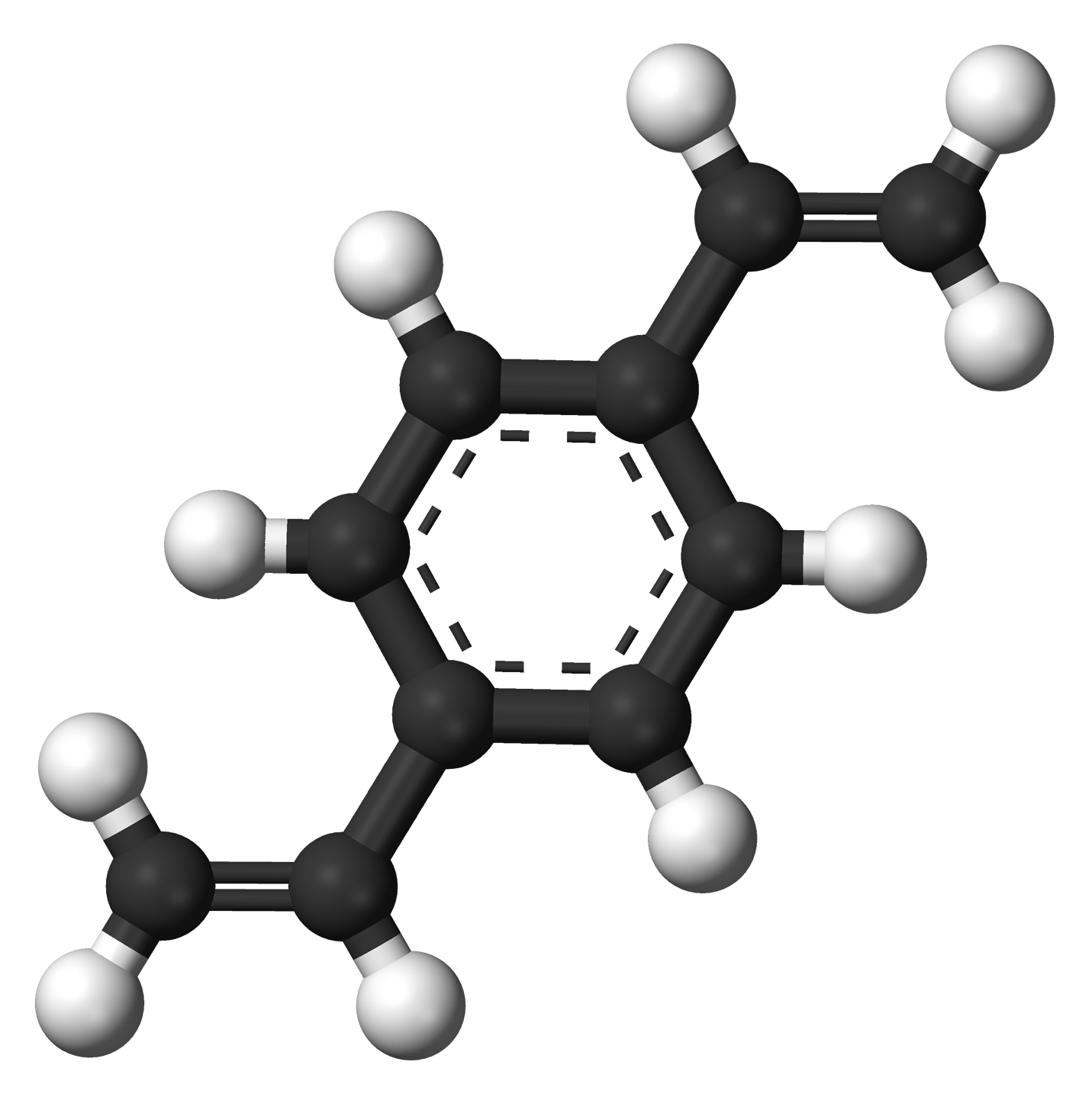
Ball-and-stick model of p-Divinylbenzene

Names
- Other names Diethylene benzene, DVB, Vinylstyrene

Identifiers
CAS Number	1321-74-0; m-: 108-57-6; p-: 105-06-6
3D model (JSmol)	Interactive image; m-: Interactive image; p-: Interactive image
ChemSpider	60033; m-: 7653; p-: 59432
ECHA InfoCard	100.013.932
EC Number	215-325-5; m-: 203-595-7; p-: 203-266-8
PubChem CID	66666; m-: 7941; p-: 66041
RTECS number	CZ9370000; m-: CZ9450000
UNII	IZ715T4SBU; m-: 4S46QL2WFU; p-: QN8RGZ4ML2
UN number	3532 3534
CompTox Dashboard (EPA)	DTXSID2025216
- InChI: p-: InChI=1S/C10H10/c1-3-9-5-7-10(4-2)8-6-9/h3-8H,1-2H2 Key: WEERVPDNCOGWJF-UHFFFAOYSA-N
- SMILES: C=CC1=CC=CC=C1C=C; m-: C=CC1=CC(=CC=C1)C=C; p-: C=CC1=CC=C(C=C1)C=C

Properties
Chemical formula	C_{10}H_{10}
Molar mass	130.190 g·mol^{−1}
Appearance	pale, straw-colored liquid
Density	0.914 g/mL
Melting point	−66.9 to −52 °C (−88.4 to −61.6 °F; 206.2 to 221.2 K)
Boiling point	195 °C (383 °F; 468 K)
Solubility in water	0.005% (20°C)
Solubility in other solvents	Soluble in ethanol and ether
Vapor pressure	0.7 mmHg (20°C)

Hazards
Flash point	76 °C (169 °F; 349 K)
Explosive limits	1.1%-6.2%
- NIOSH (US health exposure limits)
PEL (Permissible)	none
REL (Recommended)	TWA 10 ppm (50 mg/m^{3})
IDLH (Immediate danger)	N.D.
- Except where otherwise noted, data are given for materials in their standard state (at 25 °C [77 °F], 100 kPa). verify (what is ?) Infobox references

Divinylbenzene (DVB) is an organic compound with the chemical formula C_{6}H_{4}(CH=CH_{2})_{2} and structure H_{2}C=CH−C_{6}H_{4}−HC=CH_{2} (a benzene ring with two vinyl groups as substituents). It is related to styrene (vinylbenzene, C_{6}H_{5}−CH=CH_{2}) by the addition of a second vinyl group. It is a colorless liquid manufactured by the thermal dehydrogenation of isomeric diethylbenzenes. Under synthesis conditions, o-divinylbenzene converts to naphthalene and thus is not a component of the usual mixtures of DVB.

== Production and use ==
It is produced by dehydrogenation of diethylbenzene:

C_{6}H_{4}(C_{2}H_{5})_{2} → C_{6}H_{4}(C_{2}H_{3})_{2} + 2 H_{2}

Divinylbenzene is usually encountered as a 2:1 mixture of m- and p-divinylbenzene, containing also the corresponding isomers of ethylvinylbenzene.

Styrene and divinylbenzene react to form the copolymer styrene-divinylbenzene, S-DVB or Sty-DVB. The resulting cross-linked polymer is mainly used for the production of ion exchange resin and Merrifield resins for peptide synthesis.

== Nomenclature ==
- Ortho: variously known as 1,2-diethenylbenzene, 1,2-divinylbenzene, o-vinylstyrene, o-divinylbenzene
- Meta: known as 1,3-diethenylbenzene, 1,3-divinylbenzene, m-vinylstyrene, m-divinylbenzene
- Para: known as 1,4-diethenylbenzene, 1,4-divinylbenzene, p-vinylstyrene, p-divinylbenzene.

These compounds are systematically called diethenylbenzene, although this nomenclature is rarely encountered.
