= Diethylbenzenes =

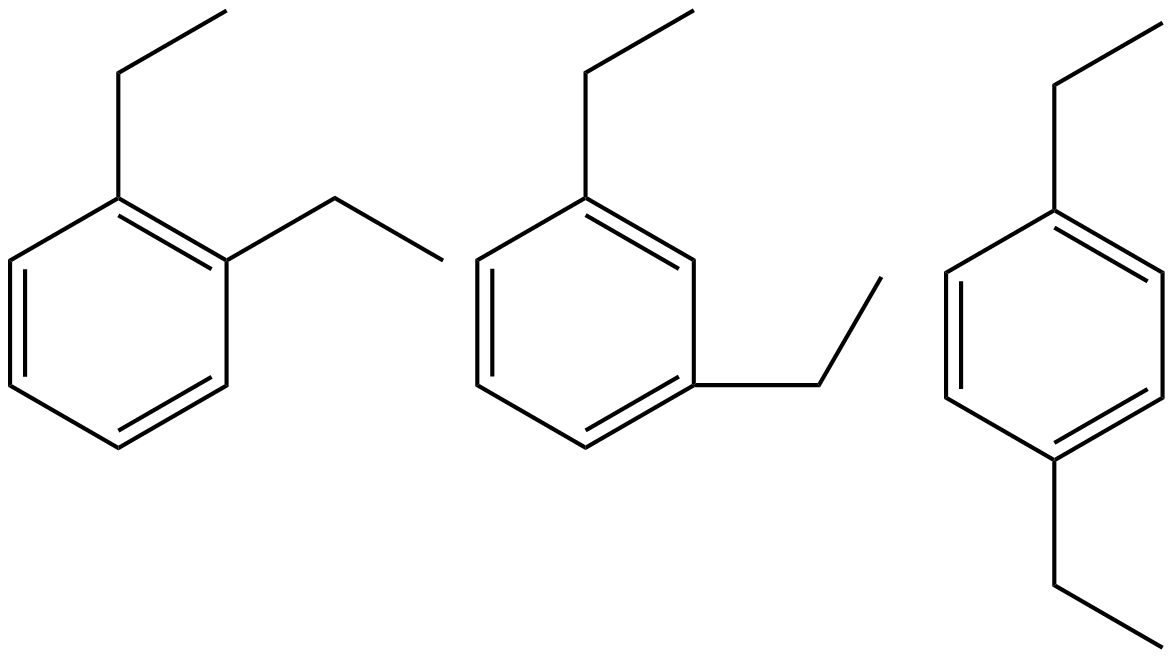
- The three isomers of diethylbenzene: ortho-, meta-, and para-diethylbenzene (left to right)

Identifiers
CAS Number	25340-17-4; 1,2: 135-01-3; 1,3: 141-93-5; 1,4: 105-05-5
3D model (JSmol)	1,2: Interactive image; 1,3: Interactive image; 1,4: Interactive image
ChemSpider	1,2: 8335; 1,3: 8531; 1,4: 7448
ECHA InfoCard	100.042.599
EC Number	1,2: 205-170-1; 1,3: 205-511-4; 1,4: 203-265-2
PubChem CID	1,2: 8657; 1,3: 8864; 1,4: 7734
RTECS number	CZ5600000
UNII	9A18Z78Q73; 1,2: 25HOX6T1LU; 1,3: ZM2X7I1G8Y; 1,4: 0PSM16X42D
UN number	2049
CompTox Dashboard (EPA)	DTXSID4027866
- InChI: 1,2: InChI=1S/C10H14/c1-3-9-7-5-6-8-10(9)4-2/h5-8H,3-4H2,1-2H3 Key: KVNYFPKFSJIPBJ-UHFFFAOYSA-N; 1,3: InChI=1S/C10H14/c1-3-9-6-5-7-10(4-2)8-9/h5-8H,3-4H2,1-2H3 Key: AFZZYIJIWUTJFO-UHFFFAOYSA-N; 1,4: InChI=1S/C10H14/c1-3-9-5-7-10(4-2)8-6-9/h5-8H,3-4H2,1-2H3 Key: DSNHSQKRULAAEI-UHFFFAOYSA-N
- SMILES: 1,2: CCC1=CC=CC=C1CC; 1,3: CCC1=CC(=CC=C1)CC; 1,4: CCC1=CC=C(C=C1)CC

Properties
Chemical formula	C_{10}H_{14}
Molar mass	134.222 g·mol^{−1}
Density	0.87 g/mL

Hazards
Flash point	134.6 °F / 57 °C
- Except where otherwise noted, data are given for materials in their standard state (at 25 °C [77 °F], 100 kPa). Infobox references

Diethylbenzene (DEB) is any of three isomers with the formula C_{6}H_{4}(C_{2}H_{5})_{2}. Each consists of a benzene ring and two ethyl substituents. The meta and para have the greater commercial significance. All are colorless solids.

Physical Properties
Compound names	m.p. °C	b.p. °C	Density g/cm^{3}	Refractive Index
1,2-Diethylbenzene, o-diethylbenzene	31.2	183.5	0.8800	1.5035
1,3-Diethylbenzene, m-diethylbenzene	83.9	181.1	0.8602	1.4955
1,4-Diethylbenzene, p-diethylbenzene	42.8	183.8	0.8620	1.4967

== Production and applications ==
Diethylbenzenes arise as side-products of the alkylation of benzene with ethylene, which can be described as two steps. The first step is the industrial route to ethylbenzene, which is produced on a large scale as a precursor to styrene.

C_{6}H_{6} + C_{2}H_{4} → C_{6}H_{5}C_{2}H_{5}

The diethylbenzene is an inadvertent side product.

C_{6}H_{5}C_{2}H_{5} + C_{2}H_{4} → C_{6}H_{4}(C_{2}H_{5})_{2}

Using shape-selective zeolite catalysts, the para isomer can be produced in high selectivity.

Much diethylbenzene is recycled by transalkylation to give ethylbenzene:

C_{6}H_{4}(C_{2}H_{5})_{2} + C_{6}H_{6} → 2 C_{6}H_{5}C_{2}H_{5}

== Uses ==
Diethylbenzene is used in a mixture with methyl and/or ethyl biphenyls as a low temperature heat transfer fluid.

Diethylbenzene is dehydrogenated to give divinylbenzene (DVB):

C_{6}H_{4}(C_{2}H_{5})_{2} → C_{6}H_{4}(C_{2}H_{3})_{2} + 2 H_{2}

DVB is used in the production of crosslinked polystyrene.
