= Tetramethylbenzene =

Group of chemical compounds

The tetramethylbenzenes constitute a group of substances of aromatic hydrocarbons, which structure consists of a benzene ring with four methyl groups (–CH_{3}) as a substituent. Through their different arrangement, they form three structural isomers with the molecular formula C_{10}H_{14}. They also belong to the group of C_{4}-benzenes. The best-known isomer is durene.

Tetramethylbenzenes
Common name	prehnitene	isodurene	durene
Systematic name	1,2,3,4-tetramethylbenzene	1,2,3,5-tetramethylbenzene	1,2,4,5-tetramethylbenzene
Structural formula			
CAS Registry Number	488-23-3	527-53-7	95-93-2
