= O-Cymene =

Organic compound

o-Cymene

Names
- Preferred IUPAC name 1-Methyl-2-(propan-2-yl)benzene
- Other names: o-Cymene; 2-isopropyltoluene; 2-methylcumene; 1-isopropyl-2-methylbenzene

Identifiers
CAS Number	527-84-4
3D model (JSmol)	Interactive image
ChEBI	CHEBI:28768
ChemSpider	10253
EC Number	208-426-0
PubChem CID	10703
UNII	2T13HF3266
- InChI: InChI=1S/C10H14/c1-8(2)10-7-5-4-6-9(10)3/h4-8H,1-3H3 Key: WWRCMNKATXZARA-UHFFFAOYSA-N
- SMILES: CC1=CC=CC=C1C(C)C

Properties
Chemical formula	C_{10}H_{14}
Molar mass	134.22
Appearance	colorless liquid
Density	0.88 g/cm^{3}
Melting point	−71.5 °C (−96.7 °F; 201.7 K)
Boiling point	178 °C (352 °F; 451 K)
Solubility in water	23.3 mg/L

Hazards
- Occupational safety and health (OHS/OSH)
Main hazards	Flammable
- GHS labelling
Pictograms	(GHS02: Flammable)
Signal word	Warning
Hazard statements	H226
Precautionary statements	P210, P233, P240, P241, P242, P243, P280, P303+P361+P353, P370+P378, P403+P235, P501
Flash point	50.6 °C (123.1 °F; 323.8 K)
- Except where otherwise noted, data are given for materials in their standard state (at 25 °C [77 °F], 100 kPa). Infobox references

o-Cymene is an organic compound classified as an aromatic hydrocarbon. Its structure consists of a benzene ring ortho-substituted with a methyl group and an isopropyl group. It is a flammable colorless liquid which is nearly insoluble in water but soluble in organic solvents.

== Isomers and production ==
In addition to o-cymene, there are two other geometric isomers called m-cymene, in which the alkyl groups are meta-substituted, and p-cymene, in which they are para-substituted. p-Cymene is the only isomer found in nature. The three isomers form the group of cymenes.

Cymenes can be produced by alkylation of toluene with propylene.
