= P-Cymene =

p-Cymene
Skeletal formula
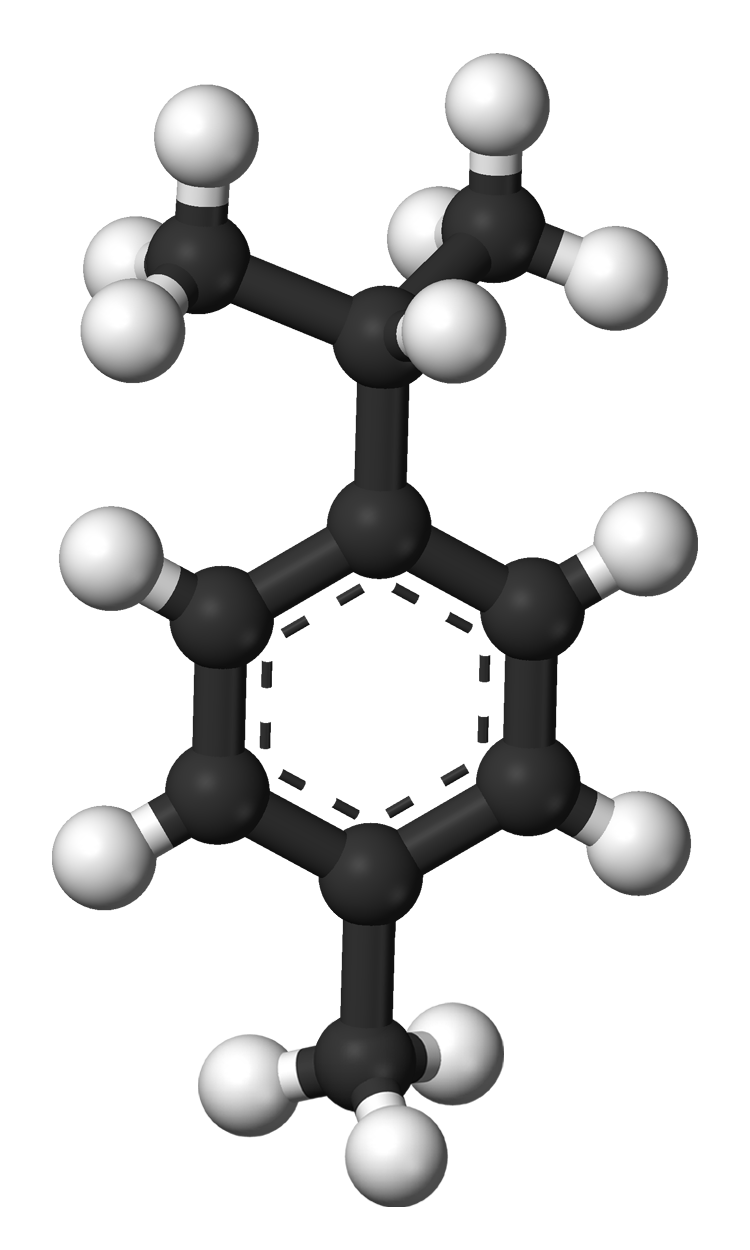
Ball-and-stick model

Names
- Preferred IUPAC name 1-Methyl-4-(propan-2-yl)benzene
- Other names para-Cymene; 4-Isopropyltoluene; 4-Methylcumene; Paracymene

Identifiers
CAS Number	99-87-6
3D model (JSmol)	Interactive image
Beilstein Reference	1903377
ChEBI	CHEBI:28768
ChEMBL	ChEMBL442915
ChemSpider	7183
ECHA InfoCard	100.002.542
EC Number	202-796-7
Gmelin Reference	305912
KEGG	C06575
PubChem CID	7463
RTECS number	GZ5950000
UNII	1G1C8T1N7Q
UN number	2046
CompTox Dashboard (EPA)	DTXSID3026645
- InChI: InChI=1S/C10H14/c1-8(2)10-6-4-9(3)5-7-10/h4-8H,1-3H3 Key: HFPZCAJZSCWRBC-UHFFFAOYSA-N; InChI=1/C10H14/c1-8(2)10-6-4-9(3)5-7-10/h4-8H,1-3H3 Key: HFPZCAJZSCWRBC-UHFFFAOYAD
- SMILES: c1cc(ccc1C(C)C)C

Properties
Chemical formula	C_{10}H_{14}
Molar mass	134.222 g·mol^{−1}
Appearance	Colourless liquid
Density	0.857 g/cm^{3}
Melting point	−68 °C (−90 °F; 205 K)
Boiling point	177 °C (351 °F; 450 K)
Solubility in water	23.4 mg/L
Magnetic susceptibility (χ)	−1.028×10^{−4} cm^{3}/mol
Refractive index (n_{D})	1.4908 (at 20 °C)

Hazards
- GHS labelling
Pictograms	(GHS02: Flammable) (GHS08: Health hazard) (GHS09: Environmental hazard)
Signal word	Danger
Hazard statements	H226, H304, H411
Precautionary statements	P210, P233, P240, P241, P242, P243, P273, P280, P301+P310, P303+P361+P353, P331, P370+P378, P391, P403+P235, P405, P501
Flash point	47 °C (117 °F; 320 K)
Autoignition temperature	435 °C (815 °F; 708 K)
- Except where otherwise noted, data are given for materials in their standard state (at 25 °C [77 °F], 100 kPa). verify (what is ?) Infobox references

p-Cymene is a naturally occurring aromatic organic compound. It is classified as an alkylbenzene related to monocyclic monoterpenes. Its structure consists of a benzene ring para-substituted with a methyl group and an isopropyl group. p-Cymene is insoluble in water, but miscible with organic solvents.

== Isomers and production ==
In addition to p-cymene, two less common geometric isomers are o-cymene, in which the alkyl groups are ortho-substituted, and m-cymene, in which they are meta-substituted. p-Cymene is the only natural isomer, as expected from the terpene rule. All three isomers form the group of cymenes.

Cymene is also produced by alkylation of toluene with propene.

== Related compounds ==
It is a constituent of a number of essential oils, most commonly the oil of cumin and thyme. Significant amounts are formed in sulfite pulping process from the wood terpenes.

p-Cymene is a common ligand for ruthenium. The parent compound is [(η^{6}-cymene)RuCl_{2}]_{2}. This half-sandwich compound is prepared by the reaction of ruthenium trichloride with the terpene α-phellandrene. The osmium complex is also known.

Hydrogenation gives the saturated derivative p-menthane.
