= N-Butylbenzene =

n-Butylbenzene

Names
- Preferred IUPAC name Butylbenzene
- Other names 1-Butylbenzene; 1-Phenylbutane

Identifiers
CAS Number	104-51-8
3D model (JSmol)	Interactive image
Abbreviations	NBB; PhBu; Phn-Bu; PhnBu; Ph^{n}Bu
ChEBI	CHEBI:44194
ChEMBL	ChEMBL195441
ChemSpider	7419
DrugBank	DB01845
ECHA InfoCard	100.002.918
EC Number	203-209-7
Gmelin Reference	261411
KEGG	C18150
PubChem CID	7705
UNII	S8XZ2901RZ
UN number	2709
CompTox Dashboard (EPA)	DTXSID6022472
- InChI: InChI=1S/C10H14/c1-2-3-7-10-8-5-4-6-9-10/h4-6,8-9H,2-3,7H2,1H3 Key: OCKPCBLVNKHBMX-UHFFFAOYSA-N
- SMILES: CCCCC1=CC=CC=C1

Properties
Chemical formula	C_{10}H_{14}
Molar mass	134.222 g·mol^{−1}
Appearance	Colorless liquid
Density	0.8601 g/cm^{3} at 20 °C
Melting point	−87.9 °C (−126.2 °F; 185.2 K)
Boiling point	183.3 °C (361.9 °F; 456.4 K)
Solubility in water	11.8 mg/L
Solubility	alcohol, ether, benzene

Hazards
- GHS labelling
Pictograms	(GHS02: Flammable) (GHS07: Exclamation mark) (GHS09: Environmental hazard)
Signal word	Warning
Hazard statements	H226, H315, H319, H410
Precautionary statements	P210, P233, P240, P241, P242, P243, P264, P273, P280, P302+P352, P303+P361+P353, P305+P351+P338, P321, P332+P313, P337+P313, P362, P370+P378, P391, P403+P235, P501
Flash point	71 °C; 160 °F; 344 K
Autoignition temperature	410 °C (770 °F; 683 K)

Related compounds
Related compounds	iso-Butylbenzene, sec-Butylbenzene, tert-Butylbenzene
- Except where otherwise noted, data are given for materials in their standard state (at 25 °C [77 °F], 100 kPa). Infobox references

n-Butylbenzene is the organic compound with the formula C_{10}H_{14} or C_{6}H_{5}C_{4}H_{9}. Of two isomers of butylbenzene, n-butylbenzene consists of a phenyl group attached to the 1 position of a butyl group. It is a slightly greasy, colorless liquid.

The synthesis of n-butylbenzene by the reaction of chlorobenzene and butylmagnesium bromide was one of the first demonstrations of the Kumada coupling using nickel diphosphine catalysts. This mild and efficient process contrasted with older methods.

== See also ==
- C_{4}-Benzenes
