= M-Cymene =

Organic compound

m-Cymene

Names
- Preferred IUPAC name 1-Methyl-3-(propan-2-yl)benzene
- Other names: m-Cymene; 3-isopropyltoluene; 3-methylcumene; 1-isopropyl-3-methylbenzene

Identifiers
CAS Number	535-77-3
3D model (JSmol)	Interactive image
ChEBI	CHEBI:28768
ChemSpider	10355
EC Number	208-617-9
PubChem CID	10812
UNII	10ZH8R921S
- InChI: InChI=1S/C10H14/c1-8(2)10-6-4-5-9(3)7-10/h4-8H,1-3H3 Key: XCYJPXQACVEIOS-UHFFFAOYSA-N
- SMILES: CC1=CC(=CC=C1)C(C)C

Properties
Chemical formula	C_{10}H_{14}
Molar mass	134.22
Appearance	colorless liquid
Density	0.86 g/cm^{3}
Melting point	−63.8 °C (−82.8 °F; 209.3 K)
Boiling point	175 °C (347 °F; 448 K)
Solubility in water	42.5 mg/L

Hazards
- Occupational safety and health (OHS/OSH)
Main hazards	Flammable
- GHS labelling
Pictograms	(GHS02: Flammable)
Signal word	Warning
Hazard statements	H226
Precautionary statements	P210, P233, P240, P241, P242, P243, P280, P303+P361+P353, P370+P378, P403+P235, P501
Flash point	47.8 °C (118.0 °F; 320.9 K)
- Except where otherwise noted, data are given for materials in their standard state (at 25 °C [77 °F], 100 kPa). Infobox references

m-Cymene is an organic compound classified as an aromatic hydrocarbon. Its structure consists of a benzene ring meta-substituted with a methyl group and an isopropyl group. It is a flammable colorless liquid which is nearly insoluble in water but soluble in organic solvents.

== Isomers and production ==
In addition to m-cymene, there are two other geometric isomers called o-cymene, in which the alkyl groups are ortho-substituted, and p-cymene, in which they are para-substituted. p-Cymene is the most common and only natural isomer. The three isomers form the group of cymenes.

Cymenes can be produced by alkylation of toluene with propylene.
