= Tert-Butylbenzene =

Organic compound

tert-Butylbenzene

Names
- Preferred IUPAC name tert-Butylbenzene
- Other names: t-butylbenzene; 1,1-dimethylethylbenzene

Identifiers
CAS Number	98-06-6
3D model (JSmol)	Interactive image
Abbreviations	Me_{3}CPh; Pht-Bu; PhtBu; Ph^{t}Bu
ChEMBL	ChEMBL1797277
ChemSpider	7088
ECHA InfoCard	100.002.394
EC Number	202-632-4
PubChem CID	7366
UNII	M1R2NME7S2
UN number	2709
CompTox Dashboard (EPA)	DTXSID3047138
- InChI: InChI=1S/C10H14/c1-10(2,3)9-7-5-4-6-8-9/h4-8H,1-3H3 Key: YTZKOQUCBOVLHL-UHFFFAOYSA-N
- SMILES: CC(C)(C)C1=CC=CC=C1

Properties
Chemical formula	C_{10}H_{14}
Molar mass	134.222 g·mol^{−1}
Appearance	colorless liquid
Density	0.867 g/cm^{3}
Melting point	−57.9 °C (−72.2 °F; 215.2 K)
Boiling point	169 °C (336 °F; 442 K)
Solubility in water	insoluble
Solubility in organic solvents	miscible

Hazards
- Occupational safety and health (OHS/OSH)
Main hazards	Flammable
- GHS labelling
Pictograms	(GHS02: Flammable) (GHS07: Exclamation mark)
Signal word	Warning
Hazard statements	H226, H315, H319
Precautionary statements	P210, P233, P240, P241, P242, P243, P261, P264, P271, P280, P302+P352, P303+P361+P353, P304+P312, P304+P340, P305+P351+P338, P312, P321, P332+P313, P362, P370+P378, P403+P235, P501
Flash point	34.4 °C (93.9 °F; 307.5 K)
Autoignition temperature	450 °C (842 °F; 723 K)

Related compounds
Related compounds	iso-Butylbenzene, sec-Butylbenzene, n-Butylbenzene
- Except where otherwise noted, data are given for materials in their standard state (at 25 °C [77 °F], 100 kPa). Infobox references

tert-Butylbenzene is an organic compound classified as an aromatic hydrocarbon. Its structure consists of a benzene ring substituted with a tert-butyl group. It is a flammable colorless liquid which is nearly insoluble in water but miscible with organic solvents.

== Production ==
tert-Butylbenzene can be produced by the treatment of benzene with isobutene or by the reaction of benzene with tert-butyl chloride in the presence of anhydrous aluminium chloride, the latter is depicted below:

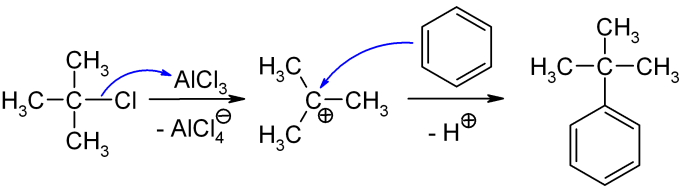
