= Prehnitene =

Organic compound

Names
- Preferred IUPAC name 1,2,3,4-Tetramethylbenzene
- Other names Prehnitene

Identifiers
CAS Number	488-23-3
3D model (JSmol)	Interactive image
Beilstein Reference	1904390
ChEBI	CHEBI:38997
ChEMBL	ChEMBL1797278
ChemSpider	9844
ECHA InfoCard	100.006.976
EC Number	207-673-1
Gmelin Reference	101866
PubChem CID	10263
UNII	96WT7D2WXJ
CompTox Dashboard (EPA)	DTXSID4060072
- InChI: InChI=1S/C10H14/c1-7-5-6-8(2)10(4)9(7)3/h5-6H,1-4H3 Key: UOHMMEJUHBCKEE-UHFFFAOYSA-N
- SMILES: CC1=C(C(=C(C=C1)C)C)C

Properties
Chemical formula	C_{10}H_{14}
Molar mass	134.22
Appearance	colorless liquid
Density	0.90 g/cm^{3}
Melting point	−6.2 °C (20.8 °F; 266.9 K)
Boiling point	205 °C (401 °F; 478 K)
Solubility in water	33.9 mg/l

Hazards
- Occupational safety and health (OHS/OSH)
Main hazards	Flammable
- GHS labelling
Pictograms	(GHS07: Exclamation mark)
Signal word	Warning
Hazard statements	H315, H319, H335
Precautionary statements	P261, P264, P271, P280, P302+P352, P304+P340, P305+P351+P338, P312, P321, P332+P313, P337+P313, P362, P403+P233, P405, P501
Flash point	68.3 °C (154.9 °F; 341.4 K)
- Except where otherwise noted, data are given for materials in their standard state (at 25 °C [77 °F], 100 kPa). Infobox references

Prehnitene or 1,2,3,4-tetramethylbenzene is an organic compound with the formula C_{6}H_{2}(CH_{3})_{4}, classified as an aromatic hydrocarbon. It is a flammable colorless liquid which is nearly insoluble in water but soluble in organic solvents. It occurs naturally in coal tar. Prehnitene is one of three isomers of tetramethylbenzene, the other two being isodurene (1,2,3,5-tetramethylbenzene) and durene (1,2,4,5-tetramethylbenzene). It is a relatively easily oxidized benzene derivative, with E_{1/2} of 2.0 V vs NHE.

== Production ==
Industrially, prehnitene can be isolated from the reformed fraction of oil refineries. It may also be produced by methylation of toluene, xylenes and the trimethylbenzenes hemimellitene and pseudocumene.
