= Isodurene =

Organic compound

Names
- Preferred IUPAC name 1,2,3,5-Tetramethylbenzene
- Other names Isodurene

Identifiers
CAS Number	527-53-7
3D model (JSmol)	Interactive image
ChEMBL	ChEMBL1797133
ChemSpider	10245
ECHA InfoCard	100.007.653
EC Number	208-417-1
PubChem CID	10695
UNII	0JBI5Y5A5Z
UN number	1993
CompTox Dashboard (EPA)	DTXSID6026119
- InChI: InChI=1S/C10H14/c1-7-5-8(2)10(4)9(3)6-7/h5-6H,1-4H3 Key: BFIMMTCNYPIMRN-UHFFFAOYSA-N
- SMILES: CC1=CC(=C(C(=C1)C)C)C

Properties
Chemical formula	C_{10}H_{14}
Molar mass	134.22
Appearance	colorless liquid
Density	0.89 g/cm^{3}
Melting point	−23.7 °C (−10.7 °F; 249.5 K)
Boiling point	198 °C (388 °F; 471 K)
Solubility in water	27.9 mg/L

Hazards
- Occupational safety and health (OHS/OSH)
Main hazards	Flammable
- GHS labelling
Pictograms	(GHS07: Exclamation mark)
Signal word	Warning
Hazard statements	H315, H319
Precautionary statements	P264, P280, P302+P352, P305+P351+P338, P321, P332+P313, P337+P313, P362
Flash point	63.3 °C (145.9 °F; 336.4 K)
- Except where otherwise noted, data are given for materials in their standard state (at 25 °C [77 °F], 100 kPa). Infobox references

Isodurene or 1,2,3,5-tetramethylbenzene is an organic compound with the formula C_{6}H_{2}(CH_{3})_{4}, classified as an aromatic hydrocarbon. It is a flammable colorless liquid which is nearly insoluble in water but soluble in organic solvents. It occurs naturally in coal tar. Isodurene is one of three isomers of tetramethylbenzene, the other two being prehnitene (1,2,3,4-tetramethylbenzene) and durene (1,2,4,5-tetramethylbenzene).

== Preparation ==
Isoodurene can be prepared from mesitylene, which is converted to mesityl bromide. The latter reacts with magnesium to give the Grignard reagent, which can be alkylated with dimethyl sulfate.

Industrially, isodurene can be isolated from the reformed fraction of oil refineries. It may also be produced by methylation of toluene, xylenes, and trimethylbenzenes.
