= Durene =

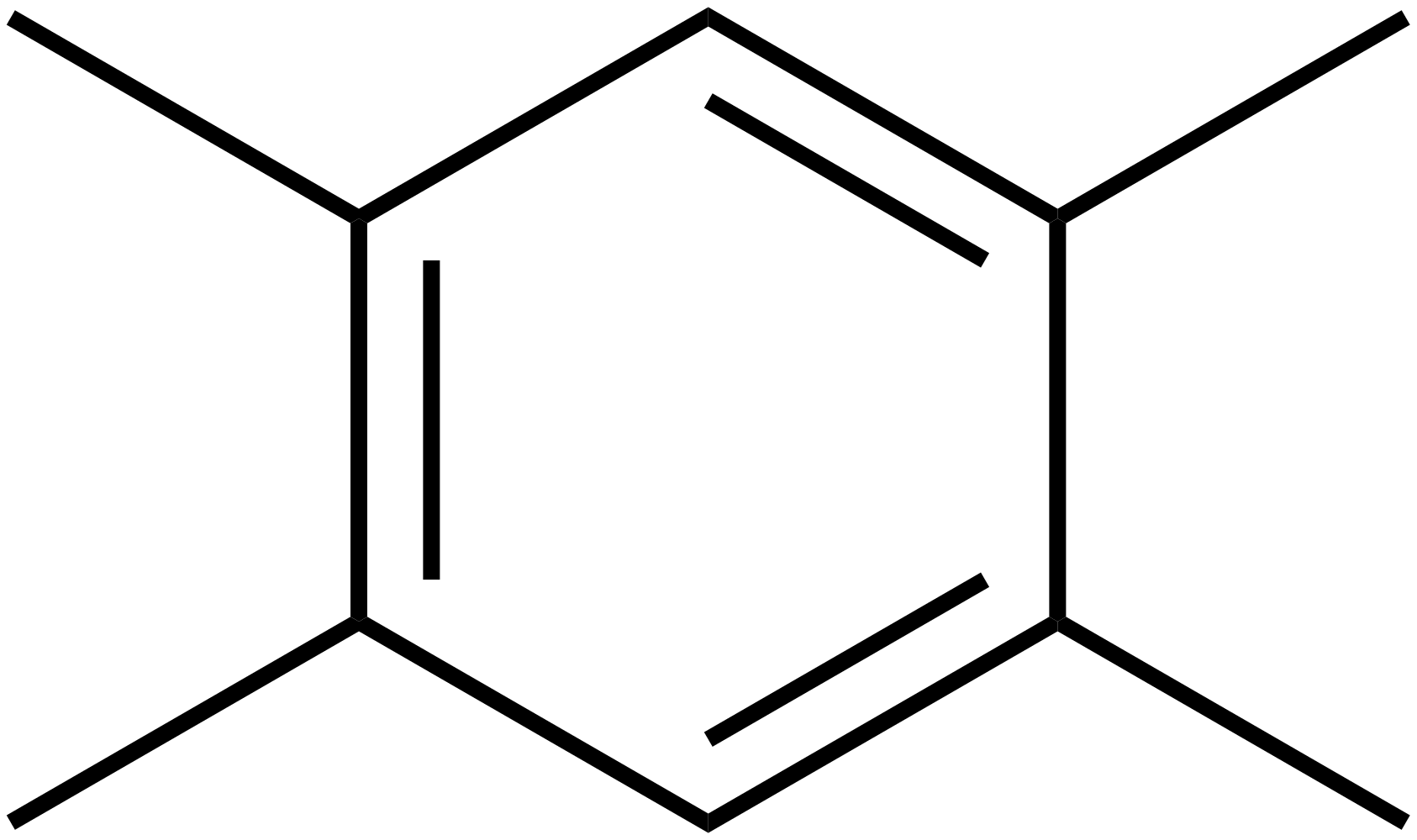

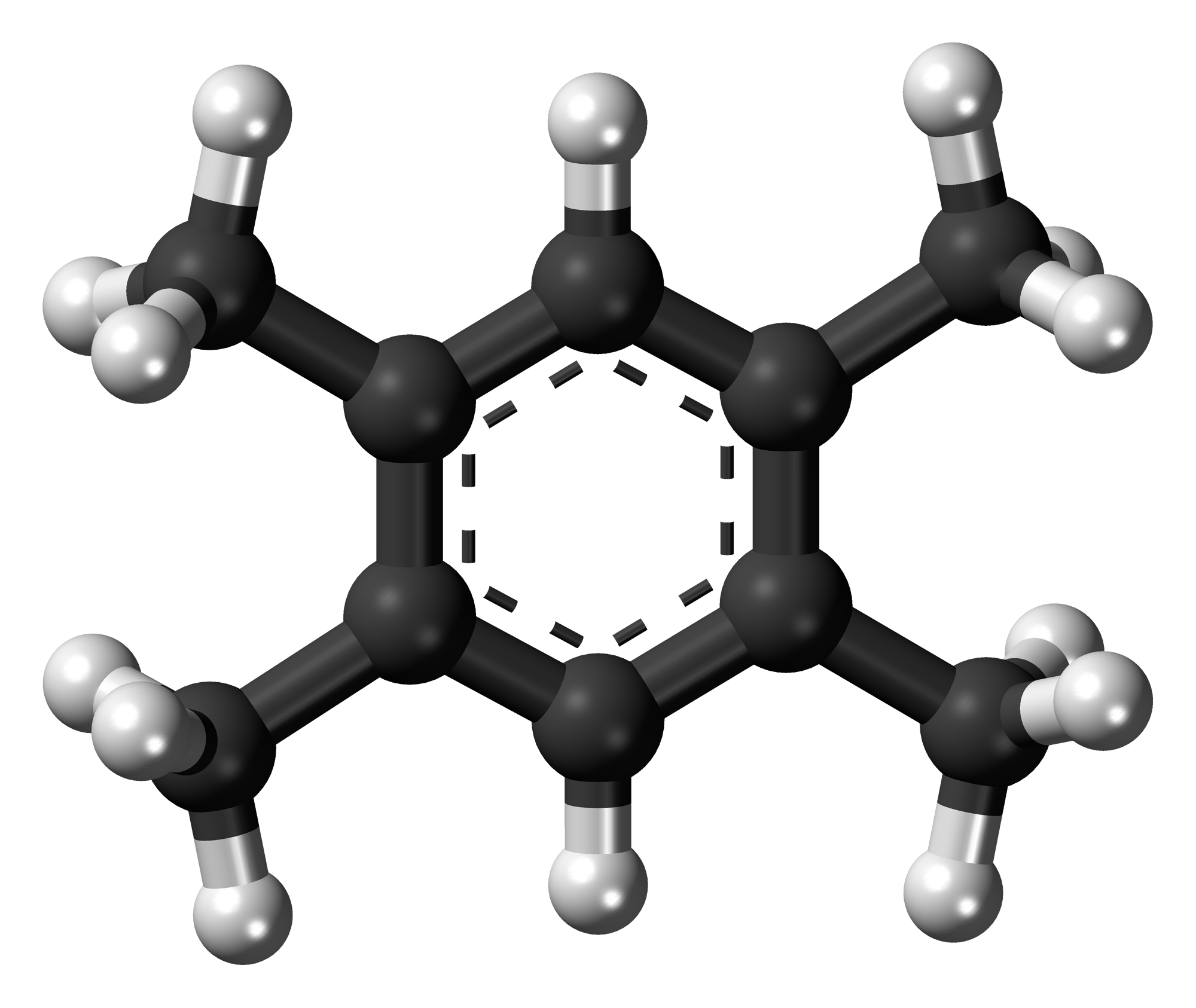

Names
- Preferred IUPAC name 1,2,4,5-Tetramethylbenzene
- Other names Durol

Identifiers
CAS Number	95-93-2
3D model (JSmol)	Interactive image
ChEBI	CHEBI:38978
ChemSpider	6999
ECHA InfoCard	100.002.242
KEGG	C14534
PubChem CID	7269
UNII	181426CFYB
CompTox Dashboard (EPA)	DTXSID1029124
- InChI: InChI=1S/C10H14/c1-7-5-9(3)10(4)6-8(7)2/h5-6H,1-4H3 Key: SQNZJJAZBFDUTD-UHFFFAOYSA-N; InChI=1/C10H14/c1-7-5-9(3)10(4)6-8(7)2/h5-6H,1-4H3 Key: SQNZJJAZBFDUTD-UHFFFAOYAJ
- SMILES: c1c(c(cc(c1C)C)C)C

Properties
Chemical formula	C_{10}H_{14}
Molar mass	134.21816
Density	0.868 g/cm^{3}
Melting point	79.2 °C (174.6 °F; 352.3 K)
Boiling point	192 °C (378 °F; 465 K) at 760mmHg
Magnetic susceptibility (χ)	−101.2·10^{−6} cm^{3}/mol

Hazards
- Occupational safety and health (OHS/OSH)
Main hazards	Flammable
Flash point	73.9 °C (165.0 °F; 347.0 K)
- Except where otherwise noted, data are given for materials in their standard state (at 25 °C [77 °F], 100 kPa). verify (what is ?) Infobox references

Durene, or 1,2,4,5-tetramethylbenzene, is an organic compound with the formula C_{6}H_{2}(CH_{3})_{4}. It is a colourless solid with a sweet odor. The compound is classified as an alkylbenzene. It is one of three isomers of tetramethylbenzene, the other two being prehnitene (1,2,3,4-tetramethylbenzene) and isodurene (1,2,3,5-tetramethylbenzene). Durene has an unusually high melting point (79.2 °C), reflecting its high molecular symmetry.

== Production ==
It is a component of coal tar and was first prepared from pseudocumene in 1870. It is produced by methylation of other methylated benzene compounds such as p-xylene and pseudocumene.

C_{6}H_{4}(CH_{3})_{2} + 2 CH_{3}Cl → C_{6}H_{2}(CH_{3})_{4} + 2 HCl

In industry, a mixture of xylenes and trimethylbenzenes is alkylated with methanol. Durene can be separated from its isomers by selective crystallization, exploiting its high melting point. The original synthesis of durene involved a similar reaction starting from toluene.

Durene is a significant byproduct of the production of gasoline from methanol via the "MTG (Methanol to Gasoline) process".

== Reactions and uses ==
It is a relatively easily oxidized benzene derivative, with E_{1/2} of 2.03 V vs NHE. Its nucleophilicity is comparable to that of phenol. It is readily halogenated on the ring for example. Nitration gives the dinitro derivative, a precursor to duroquinone. In industry, it is the precursor to pyromellitic dianhydride, which is used for manufacturing curing agents, adhesives, coating materials. It is used in the manufacture of some raw materials for engineering plastics (polyimides) and cross-linking agent for alkyd resins. It is also a suitable starting material for the synthesis of hexamethylbenzene.

With a simple proton NMR spectrum comprising two signals due to the 2 aromatic hydrogens (2H) and four methyl groups (12H), durene is used as an internal standard.

== Safety ==
Durene is not a skin irritant nor a skin sensitizer or eye irritant. Durene is only slightly toxic on an acute toxicologic basis and only poses an acute health hazard when ingested in excessive quantities.
