= Sec-Butylbenzene =

Organic compound

sec-Butylbenzene

Names
- Preferred IUPAC name (Butan-2-yl)benzene
- Other names: sec-butylbenzene; s-butylbenzene; 1-methylpropylbenzene

Identifiers
CAS Number	135-98-8
3D model (JSmol)	Interactive image
Abbreviations	SBB; Phs-Bu; PhsBu; Ph^{s}Bu
Beilstein Reference	1903902
ChEBI	CHEBI:35097
ChEMBL	ChEMBL27516
ChemSpider	8356
ECHA InfoCard	100.004.752
EC Number	205-227-0
Gmelin Reference	261109
KEGG	C14142
PubChem CID	8680
UNII	B70I0RSX3J
CompTox Dashboard (EPA)	DTXSID2022333
- InChI: InChI=1S/C10H14/c1-3-9(2)10-7-5-4-6-8-10/h4-9H,3H2,1-2H3 Key: ZJMWRROPUADPEA-UHFFFAOYSA-N
- SMILES: CCC(C)C1=CC=CC=C1

Properties
Chemical formula	C_{10}H_{14}
Molar mass	134.222 g·mol^{−1}
Appearance	colorless liquid
Density	0.863 g/cm^{3}
Melting point	−75.5 °C (−103.9 °F; 197.7 K)
Boiling point	174 °C (345 °F; 447 K)
Solubility in water	insoluble
Solubility in organic solvents	miscible

Hazards
- Occupational safety and health (OHS/OSH)
Main hazards	Flammable
- GHS labelling
Pictograms	(GHS02: Flammable) (GHS07: Exclamation mark) (GHS08: Health hazard) (GHS09: Environmental hazard)
Signal word	Danger
Hazard statements	H226, H304, H315, H319, H411
Precautionary statements	P210, P233, P240, P241, P242, P243, P264, P273, P280, P301+P310, P302+P352, P303+P361+P353, P305+P351+P338, P321, P331, P332+P313, P337+P313, P362, P370+P378, P391, P403+P235, P405, P501
Flash point	52.0 °C (125.6 °F; 325.1 K)
Autoignition temperature	418 °C (784 °F; 691 K)

Related compounds
Related compounds	iso-Butylbenzene, n-Butylbenzene, tert-Butylbenzene
- Except where otherwise noted, data are given for materials in their standard state (at 25 °C [77 °F], 100 kPa). Infobox references

sec-Butylbenzene is an organic compound classified as an aromatic hydrocarbon. Its structure consists of a benzene ring substituted with a sec-butyl group. It is a flammable colorless liquid which is nearly insoluble in water but miscible with organic solvents.

== Production ==
sec-Butylbenzene can be produced by the reaction of benzene with either n-butyl alcohol or sec-butyl alcohol in the presence of anhydrous aluminium chloride and hydrochloric acid.
