= Isobutylbenzene =

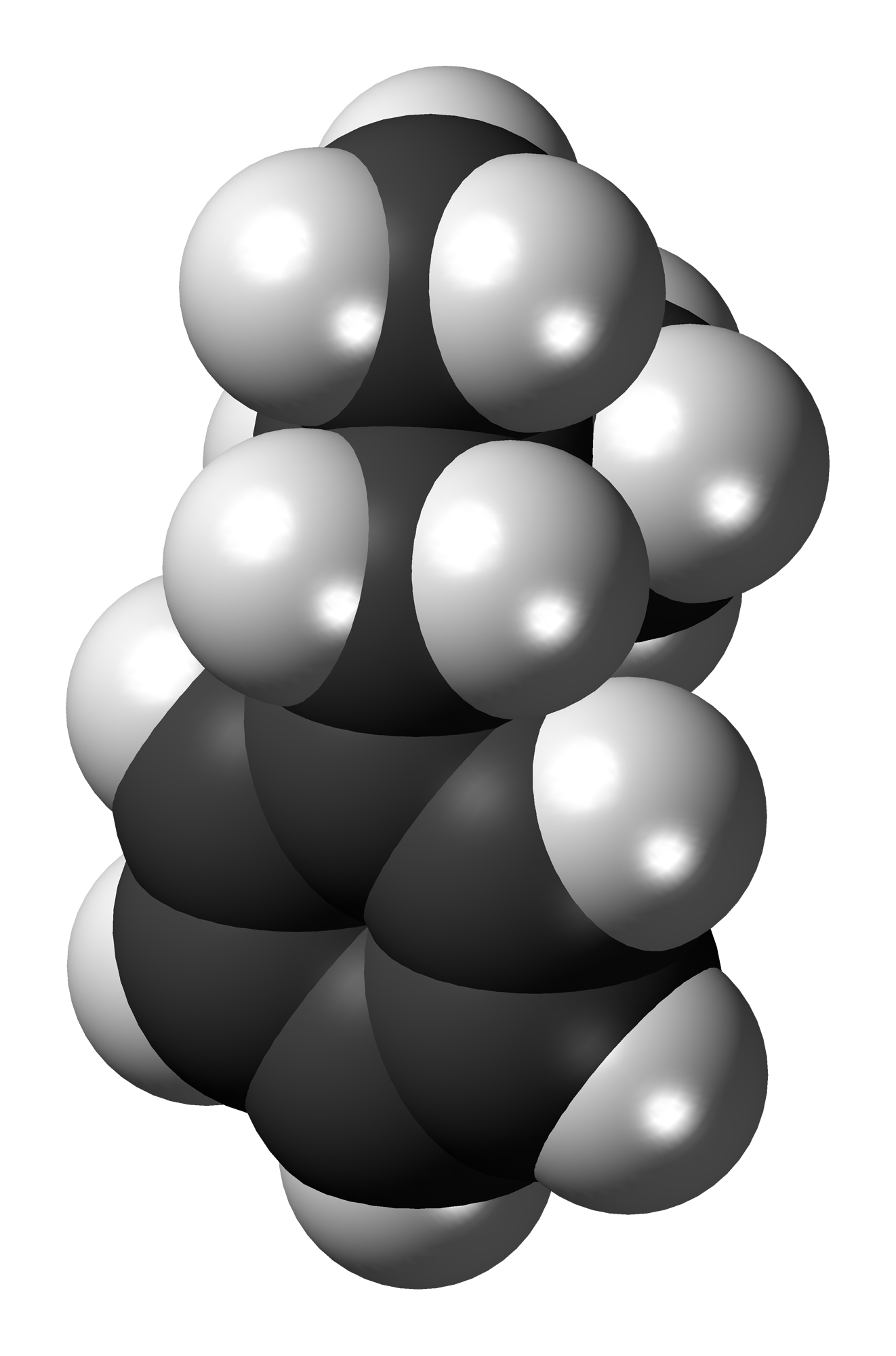

Names
- Preferred IUPAC name (2-Methylpropyl)benzene
- Other names Isobutylbenzene

Identifiers
CAS Number	538-93-2
3D model (JSmol)	Interactive image
Abbreviations	IBB; Phi-Bu; PhiBu; Ph^{i}Bu
Beilstein Reference	1852218
ChEBI	CHEBI:43261
ChEMBL	ChEMBL195882
ChemSpider	10410
DrugBank	DB04078
ECHA InfoCard	100.007.916
EC Number	208-706-2
Gmelin Reference	261101
PubChem CID	10870
UNII	FI94T26KGB
UN number	2709
CompTox Dashboard (EPA)	DTXSID6027181
- InChI: InChI=1S/C10H14/c1-9(2)8-10-6-4-3-5-7-10/h3-7,9H,8H2,1-2H3 Key: KXUHSQYYJYAXGZ-UHFFFAOYSA-N; InChI=1S/C10H14/c1-9(2)8-10-6-4-3-5-7-10/h3-7,9H,8H2,1-2H3
- SMILES: CC(C)CC1=CC=CC=C1

Properties
Chemical formula	C_{10}H_{14}
Molar mass	134.222 g·mol^{−1}
Appearance	Colorless liquid
Odor	Aromatic
Density	0.853 g/cm^{3}, liquid
Melting point	−51 °C (−60 °F; 222 K)
Boiling point	170 °C (338 °F; 443 K)
Vapor pressure	4.2 mmHg (37.7 °C)
Refractive index (n_{D})	1.486

Hazards
- GHS labelling
Pictograms	(GHS02: Flammable) (GHS07: Exclamation mark) (GHS08: Health hazard)
Signal word	Danger
Hazard statements	H226, H304, H315, H319, H335, H336
Precautionary statements	P210, P233, P240, P241, P242, P243, P261, P264, P271, P280, P301+P310, P302+P352, P303+P361+P353, P304+P340, P305+P351+P338, P312, P321, P331, P332+P313, P337+P313, P362, P370+P378, P403+P233, P403+P235, P405, P501
NFPA 704 (fire diamond)	2
Safety data sheet (SDS)	ICSC 0113

Related compounds
Related compounds	n-Butylbenzene, sec-Butylbenzene, tert-Butylbenzene, Cumene
- Except where otherwise noted, data are given for materials in their standard state (at 25 °C [77 °F], 100 kPa). Infobox references

Isobutylbenzene is a chemical compound with the molecular formula C_{10}H_{14}. It is used in chemical synthesis as a fuel and in pharmaceuticals. For instance, it is used to make pain killers like ibuprofen.

Isobutylbenzene is a colorless flammable liquid that is a respiratory irritant.

Industrial production is through catalytic carbometalation: toluene adds to propene in the presence of a sodium–potassium catalyst on activated carbon.
