= O-Xylene (data page) =

Chemical data page

This page provides supplementary chemical data on o-Xylene.

== Material Safety Data Sheet ==
The handling of this chemical may incur notable safety precautions. It is highly recommend that you seek the Material Safety Datasheet (MSDS) for this chemical from a reliable source such as eChemPortal, and follow its directions. MSDS is available from MATHESON TRI-GAS, INC. in the SDSdata.org database.

== Structure and properties ==
Structure and properties
Index of refraction, n_{D}	1.5058 at 20°C
Abbe number	?
Dielectric constant, ε_{r}	2.568 ε_{0} at 20 °C
Bond strength	?
Bond length	?
Bond angle	?
Magnetic susceptibility	?
Surface tension	30.10 dyn/cm at 20°C
Viscosity	1.1049 mPa·s at 0°C; 0.8102 mPa·s at 20°C; 0.6270 mPa·s at 40°C; 0.4168 mPa·s at 80°C; 0.2626 mPa·s at 140°C
Solubility	0.171 g/L at 25°C; 0.21 g/L at 45°C

== Thermodynamic properties ==
Phase behavior
Triple point	247.8 K (−25.3 °C), ? Pa
Critical point	631 K (358 °C), 3700 kPa
Std enthalpy change of fusion, Δ_{fus}H^{~~o~~}	13.6 kJ/mol
Std entropy change of fusion, Δ_{fus}S^{~~o~~}	54.87 J/(mol·K) at −25.3
Std enthalpy change of vaporization, Δ_{vap}H^{~~o~~}	36.24 kJ/mol at 144.5°C
Std entropy change of vaporization, Δ_{vap}S^{~~o~~}	? J/(mol·K)
Solid properties
Std enthalpy change of formation, Δ_{f}H^{~~o~~}_{solid}	? kJ/mol
Standard molar entropy, S^{~~o~~}_{solid}	? J/(mol K)
Heat capacity, c_{p}	? J/(mol K)
Liquid properties
Std enthalpy change of formation, Δ_{f}H^{~~o~~}_{liquid}	−24.4 kJ/mol
Standard molar entropy, S^{~~o~~}_{liquid}	247 J/(mol K)
Enthalpy of combustion, Δ_{c}H^{~~o~~}	−4552 kJ/mol
Heat capacity, c_{p}	187.0 J/(mol K) at 25°C
Gas properties
Std enthalpy change of formation, Δ_{f}H^{~~o~~}_{gas}	19.0 kJ/mol
Standard molar entropy, S^{~~o~~}_{gas}	353.6 J/(mol K)
Heat capacity, c_{p}	132.5 J/(mol K) at 25°C
van der Waals' constants	a = 3038 L^{2} kPa/mol^{2} b = 0.1755 liter per mole

== Vapor pressure of liquid ==
P in mm Hg	1	10	40	100	400	760
T in °C	−3.8	32.1	59.5	81.3	121.7	144.4

Table data obtained from CRC Handbook of Chemistry and Physics 44th ed.

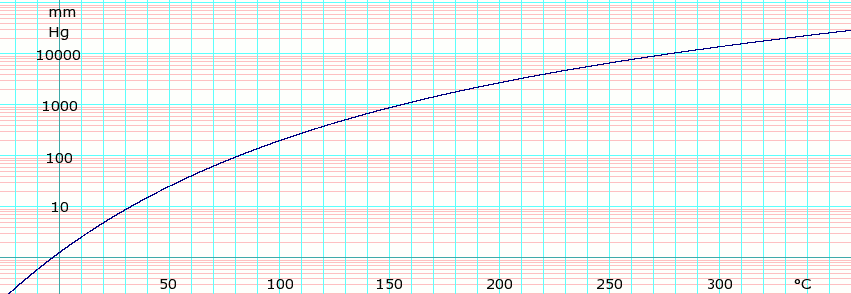
log_{10} of o-Xylene vapor pressure. Uses formula: $\scriptstyle \log_e P_{mmHg} =$$\scriptstyle \log_e (\frac {760} {101.325}) - 10.06059\log_e(T+273.15) - \frac {7946.229} {T+273.15} + 83.32184 + 5.939742 \times 10^{-6} (T+273.15)^2$ obtained from CHERIC

== Distillation data ==
See also:

- m-xylene (data page)
- p-xylene (data page)

Vapor-liquid Equilibrium for o-Xylene/m-Xylene; P = 26.66 kPa
BP Temp. °C	% by mole m-xylene
BP Temp. °C	liquid	vapor
100.1	0.0	0.0
99.8	4.7	5.6
99.6	9.7	11.4
99.2	17.8	20.6
98.8	25.9	29.3
98.4	34.1	38.1
97.9	42.5	46.8
97.6	49.6	53.9
97.2	57.4	61.5
96.8	65.5	69.2
96.5	73.5	76.5
96.1	80.8	83.2
95.8	88.6	90.2
95.6	93.7	94.6
95.3	100.0	100.0

Vapor-liquid Equilibrium for o-Xylene/Carbon tetrachloride P = 760 mm Hg
BP Temp. °C	% by mole carbon tetrachloride
BP Temp. °C	liquid	vapor
142.0	1.8	6.5
136.0	6.4	22.9
130.4	11.2	36.9
125.0	16.1	49.4
120.7	20.4	57.3
116.1	25.3	64.6
111.8	30.2	70.9
107.9	35.2	75.9
104.2	40.4	80.3
104.1	40.5	80.5
99.4	47.8	85.2
95.1	55.4	88.9
91.6	62.4	91.6
88.2	70.0	94.0
85.3	77.1	95.8
82.6	84.1	97.2
80.0	91.0	98.5
77.7	97.6	99.6

Vapor-liquid Equilibrium for o-Xylene/Ethanol; P = 101.3 kPa
BP Temp. °C	% by mole ethanol
BP Temp. °C	liquid	vapor
78.3	99.52	99.66
78.7	98.59	99.03
78.7	97.73	98.52
79.0	95.78	97.40
79.3	90.59	95.09
79.7	86.79	94.16
80.0	85.01	93.70
80.2	80.91	92.91
80.3	76.77	92.36
82.0	67.69	91.21
83.8	48.66	89.25
88.1	25.11	87.32
97.3	10.94	81.49
112.8	5.22	65.91
137.3	0.65	22.90

Vapor-liquid Equilibrium for o-Xylene/Methanol; P = 101.3 kPa
BP Temp. °C	% by mole Methanol
BP Temp. °C	liquid	vapor
64.7	98.78	99.10
64.8	98.33	98.81
64.8	97.67	98.45
64.9	96.70	97.96
65.3	93.34	96.82
65.7	86.84	95.68
66.3	84.24	95.31
66.7	83.30	95.65
67.3	76.74	94.97
68.4	49.33	94.52
71.5	21.76	93.84
102.1	2.49	80.00

== Spectral data ==
UV-Vis
λ_{max}	? nm
Extinction coefficient, ε	?
IR
Major absorption bands	? cm^{−1}
NMR
Proton NMR
Carbon-13 NMR
Other NMR data
MS
Masses of main fragments

This box:
- Except where noted otherwise, data relate to Standard temperature and pressure.
- Reliability of data general note.
