= Petrochemical =

Chemical product derived from petroleum

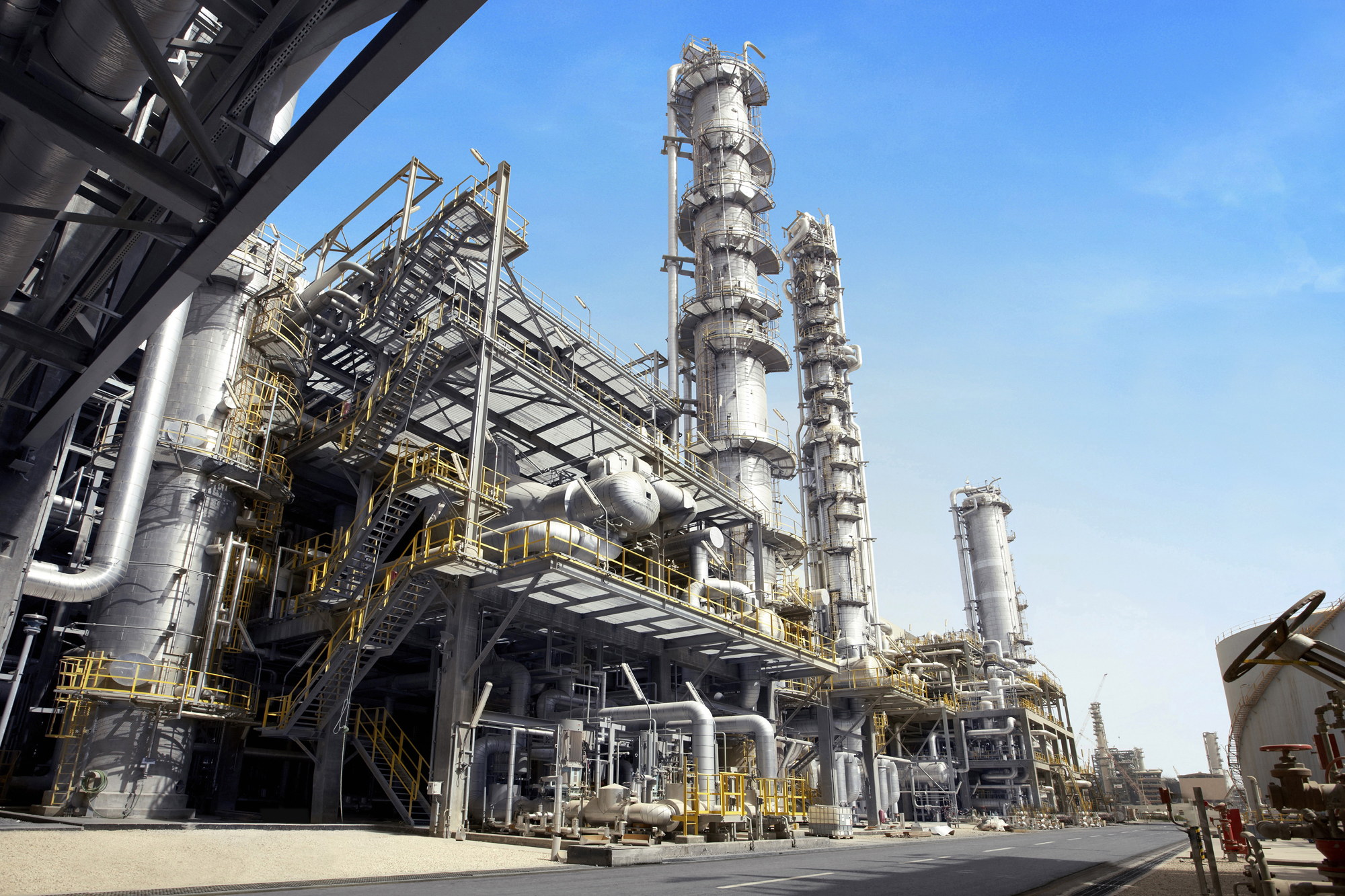
Petrochemical plant in Saudi Arabia

Petrochemicals (sometimes abbreviated as petchems) are the chemical products obtained from petroleum by refining. Some chemical compounds made from petroleum are also obtained from other fossil fuels, such as coal or natural gas, or renewable sources such as maize, palm fruit or sugar cane.

The two most common petrochemical classes are olefins (including ethylene and propylene) and aromatics (including benzene, toluene and xylene isomers).

Oil refineries produce olefins and aromatics by fluid catalytic cracking of petroleum fractions. Chemical plants produce olefins by steam cracking of natural gas liquids like ethane and propane. Aromatics are produced by catalytic reforming of naphtha. Olefins and aromatics are the building-blocks for a wide range of materials such as solvents, detergents, and adhesives. Olefins are the basis for polymers and oligomers used in plastics, resins, fibers, elastomers, lubricants, and gels.

Global ethylene production was 190 million tonnes and propylene was 120 million tonnes in 2019. Aromatics production is approximately 70 million tonnes. The largest petrochemical industries are located in the United States and Western Europe; however, major growth in new production capacity is in the Middle East and Asia. There is substantial inter-regional petrochemical trade.

Primary petrochemicals are divided into three groups depending on their chemical structure:

- Olefins includes ethene, propene, butenes and butadiene. Ethylene and propylene are important sources of industrial chemicals and plastics products. Butadiene is used in making synthetic rubber.
- Aromatics includes benzene, toluene and xylenes, as a whole referred to as BTX and primarily obtained from petroleum refineries by extraction from the reformate produced in catalytic reformers using naphtha obtained from petroleum refineries. Alternatively, BTX can be produced by aromatization of alkanes. Benzene is a raw material for dyes and synthetic detergents, and benzene and toluene for isocyanates MDI and TDI used in making polyurethanes. Manufacturers use xylenes to produce plastics and synthetic fibers.
- Synthesis gas is a mixture of carbon monoxide and hydrogen used to produce methanol and other chemicals. Steam crackers are not to be confused with steam reforming plants used to produce hydrogen for ammonia production. Ammonia is used to make the fertilizer urea and methanol is used as a solvent and chemical intermediate.
- Methane, ethane, propane and butanes obtained primarily from natural gas processing plants.
- Methanol and formaldehyde.

In 2007, the amounts of ethylene and propylene produced in steam crackers were about 115 Mt (megatonnes) and 70 Mt, respectively. The output ethylene capacity of large steam crackers ranged up to as much as 1.0 – 1.5 Mt per year.

The adjacent diagram schematically depicts the major hydrocarbon sources and processes used in producing petrochemicals.

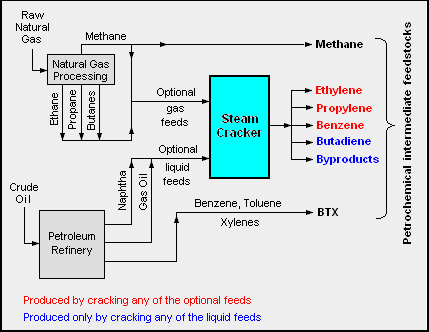
Petrochemical feed-stock sources

Like commodity chemicals, petrochemicals are made on a very large scale. Petrochemical manufacturing units differ from commodity chemical plants in that they often produce a number of related products. Compare this with specialty chemical and fine chemical manufacture where products are made in discrete batch processes.

Petrochemicals are predominantly made in a few manufacturing locations around the world, for example in Jubail and Yanbu Industrial Cities in Saudi Arabia, Texas and Louisiana in the US, in Teesside in the Northeast of England in the United Kingdom, in Tarragona in Catalonia, in Rotterdam in the Netherlands, in Antwerp in Belgium, in Jamnagar, Dahej in Gujarat, India and in Singapore. Not all of the petrochemical or commodity chemical materials produced by the chemical industry are made in one single location but groups of related materials are often made in adjacent manufacturing plants to induce industrial symbiosis as well as material and utility efficiency and other economies of scale. This is known in chemical engineering terminology as integrated manufacturing. Specialty and fine chemical companies are sometimes found in similar manufacturing locations as petrochemicals but, in most cases, they do not need the same level of large-scale infrastructure (e.g., pipelines, storage, ports, and power, etc.) and therefore can be found in multi-sector business parks.

The large-scale petrochemical manufacturing locations have clusters of manufacturing units that share utilities and large-scale infrastructures such as power stations, storage tanks, port facilities, road and rail terminals. In the United Kingdom, for example, there are four main locations for such manufacturing: near the River Mersey in North West England, on the Humber on the East coast of Yorkshire, in Grangemouth near the Firth of Forth in Scotland, and in Teesside as part of the Northeast of England Process Industry Cluster (NEPIC). To demonstrate the clustering and integration, some 50% of the United Kingdom's petrochemical and commodity chemicals are produced by the NEPIC industry cluster companies in Teesside.

== History ==
In 1835, Henri Victor Regnault, a French chemist left vinyl chloride in the sun and found white solid at the bottom of the flask which was polyvinyl chloride. In 1839, Eduard Simon discovered polystyrene by accident by distilling storax. In 1856, William Henry Perkin discovered the first synthetic dye, Mauveine. In 1888, Friedrich Reinitzer, an Austrian plant scientist observed cholesteryl benzoate had two different melting points. In 1909, Leo Hendrik Baekeland invented bakelite made from phenol and formaldehyde. In 1920, Union Carbide built in West Virginia first petrochemical plant in the world. In 1928, synthetic fuels were invented using Fischer-Tropsch process. In 1929, Walter Bock invented synthetic rubber Buna-S which is made up of styrene and butadiene and used to make car tires. In 1933, Otto Röhm polymerized the first acrylic glass methyl methacrylate. In 1935, Michael Perrin invented polyethylene. In 1937, Wallace Hume Carothers invented nylon. In 1938, Otto Bayer invented polyurethane. In 1941, Roy Plunkett invented Teflon. In 1946, he invented Polyester. Polyethylene terephthalate (PET) bottles are made from ethylene and paraxylene. In 1949, Fritz Stastny turned polystyrene into foam. After World War II, polypropylene was discovered in the early 1950s. In 1965, Stephanie Kwolek invented Kevlar.

== Olefins ==
The following is a partial list of major commercial petrochemicals and their derivatives:

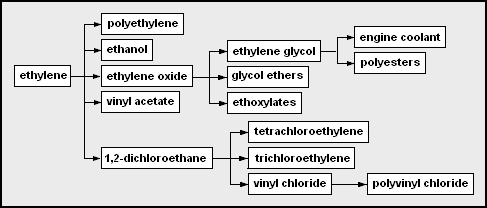
Chemicals produced from ethylene

- ethylene – the simplest olefin; used as a chemical feedstock and ripening stimulant
  - polyethylene – polymerized ethylene; LDPE, HDPE, LLDPE
  - ethanol – via ethylene hydration (chemical reaction adding water) of ethylene
  - ethylene oxide – via ethylene oxidation
    - ethylene glycol – via ethylene oxide hydration
      - engine coolant – ethylene glycol, water and inhibitor mixture
      - polyesters – any of several polymers with ester linkages in the main chain
    - glycol ethers – via glycol condescension
    - ethoxylates
  - vinyl acetate
  - 1,2-dichloroethane
    - trichloroethylene
    - tetrachloroethylene – also called perchloroethylene; used as a dry cleaning solvent and degreaser
    - vinyl chloride – monomer for polyvinyl chloride
      - polyvinyl chloride (PVC) – a type of plastic used for piping, tubing, other things

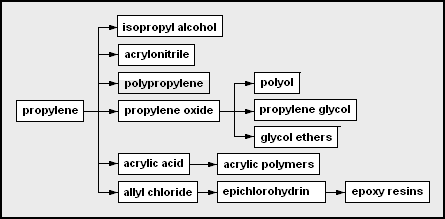
Chemicals produced from propylene

- propylene – used as a monomer and a chemical feedstock
  - isopropyl alcohol – 2-propanol; often used as a solvent or rubbing alcohol
  - acrylonitrile – useful as a monomer in forming Orlon, ABS
  - polypropylene – polymerized propylene
  - propylene oxide
    - polyether polyol – used in the production of polyurethanes
    - propylene glycol – used in engine coolant and aircraft deicer fluid
    - glycol ethers – from the condensation of glycols
  - acrylic acid
    - acrylic polymers
  - allyl chloride
    - epichlorohydrin – chloro-oxirane; used in epoxy resin formation
      - epoxy resins – a type of polymerizing glue from bisphenol A, epichlorohydrin, and some amine
- butene
  - isomers of butylene – useful as monomers or co-monomers
    - isobutylene – feed for making methyl tert-butyl ether (MTBE) or monomer for copolymerization with a low percentage of isoprene to make butyl rubber
  - 1,3-butadiene (or buta-1,3-diene) – a diene often used as a monomer or co-monomer for polymerization to elastomers such as polybutadiene, styrene-butadiene rubber, or a plastic such as acrylonitrile-butadiene-styrene (ABS)
    - synthetic rubbers – synthetic elastomers made of any one or more of several petrochemical (usually) monomers such as 1,3-butadiene, styrene, isobutylene, isoprene, chloroprene; elastomeric polymers are often made with a high percentage of conjugated diene monomers such as 1,3-butadiene, isoprene, or chloroprene
- higher olefins
  - polyolefins – such poly-alpha-olefins, which are used as lubricants
  - alpha-olefins – used as monomers, co-monomers, and other chemical precursors. For example, a small amount of 1-hexene can be copolymerized with ethylene into a more flexible form of polyethylene.
  - other higher olefins
  - detergent alcohols

== Aromatics ==
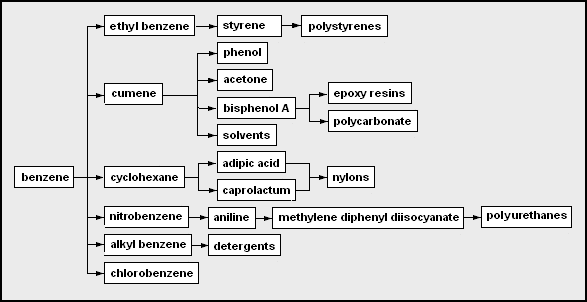
Chemicals produced from benzene

The most economically significant aromatic petrochemicals are the so-called BTX fractions (benzene, toluene, and mixed xylenes), which are derived from naphtha via fractional distillation. Heavier distillates contain heavier aromatics. Naphthalene, the simplest polyaromatic compound, is found in crude oil and coal tar. The heaviest aromatic compounds found in bitumen are called asphaltenes.

- benzene – the simplest aromatic hydrocarbon
  - ethylbenzene – made from benzene and ethylene
    - styrene – made by dehydrogenation of ethylbenzene; used as a monomer
      - polystyrenes – polymers with styrene as a monomer
  - cumene – isopropylbenzene; a feedstock in the cumene process
    - phenol – hydroxybenzene; often made by the cumene process
    - acetone – dimethyl ketone; also often made by the cumene process
    - bisphenol A – a type of "double" phenol used in polymerization in epoxy resins and making a common type of polycarbonate
      - epoxy resins – a type of polymerizing glue from bisphenol A, epichlorohydrin, and some amine
      - polycarbonate – a plastic polymer made from bisphenol A and phosgene (carbonyl dichloride)
    - solvents – liquids used for dissolving materials; examples often made from petrochemicals include ethanol, isopropyl alcohol, acetone, benzene, toluene, xylenes
  - cyclohexane – a 6-carbon aliphatic cyclic hydrocarbon sometimes used as a non-polar solvent
    - adipic acid – a 6-carbon dicarboxylic acid, which can be a precursor used as a co-monomer together with a diamine to form an alternating copolymer form of nylon.
      - nylons – types of polyamides, some are alternating copolymers formed from copolymerizing dicarboxylic acid or derivatives with diamines
    - caprolactam – a 6-carbon cyclic amide
      - nylons – types of polyamides, some are from polymerizing caprolactam
  - nitrobenzene – can be made by single nitration of benzene
    - aniline – aminobenzene
      - methylene diphenyl diisocyanate (MDI) – used as a co-monomer with diols or polyols to form polyurethanes or with di- or polyamines to form polyureas
  - alkylbenzene – a general type of aromatic hydrocarbon, which can be used as a precursor for a sulfonate surfactant (detergent)
    - detergents – often include surfactants types such as alkylbenzene sulfonates and nonylphenol ethoxylates
  - chlorobenzene

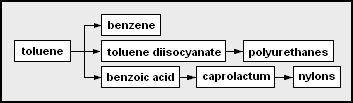
Chemicals produced from toluene

- toluene – methylbenzene; can be a solvent or precursor for other chemicals
  - benzene
  - toluene diisocyanate (TDI) – used as co-monomers with polyether polyols to form polyurethanes or with di- or polyamines to form polyureas polyurethanes
  - benzoic acid – carboxybenzene
    - caprolactam

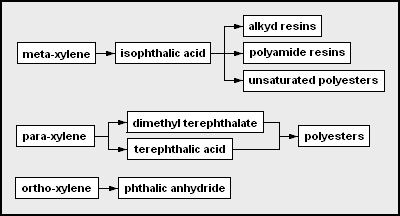
Chemicals produced from xylenes

- mixed xylenes – any of three dimethylbenzene isomers, could be a solvent but more often precursor chemicals
  - ortho-xylene – both methyl groups can be oxidized to form (ortho-)phthalic acid
    - phthalic anhydride
  - para-xylene – both methyl groups can be oxidized to form terephthalic acid
    - dimethyl terephthalate – can be copolymerized to form certain polyesters
      - polyesters – although there can be many types, polyethylene terephthalate is made from petrochemical products and is very widely used in petrol stations
    - purified terephthalic acid – often copolymerized to form polyethylene terephthalate
      - polyesters
  - meta-xylene
    - isophthalic acid
      - alkyd resins
      - polyamide resins
      - unsaturated polyesters

== See also ==
- Petroleum – Naturally occurring combustible liquid
- Petroleum product – Products ultimately derived from crude oil
- Petrodollar – International spending of petroleum export revenues
- Petrostate – Countries that primarily produce oil or natural gas
- Instrumentation in petrochemical industries
- Organization of the Petroleum Exporting Countries – International petroleum organization
- Asia Petrochemical Industry Conference (APIC)
- Northeast of England Process Industry Cluster – Economic cluster (NEPIC)
