= Aniline (disambiguation) =

Aniline is an organic compound with the formula C_{6}H_{5}NH_{2}.

- Aniline (data page)

Aniline may also refer to:

- Mauveine (also known as aniline dye), the first synthetic organic dye
- Aniline leather, leather treated with aniline as a dye
- Aniline Yellow, a yellow azo dye and an aromatic amine
- Aniline Blue WS, a mixture of methyl blue and water blue
- Aniline point, the temperature at which equal volumes of aniline and diesel oil are completely miscible

== See also ==
- ANLN or anillin, a protein
