= Land use regression model =

Pollution analysis algorithm

A land use regression model (LUR model) is an algorithm often used for analyzing pollution, particularly in densely populated areas.

The model is based on predictable pollution patterns to estimate concentrations in a particular area. This requires some linkage to the environmental characteristics of the area, especially characteristics that influence pollutant emission intensity and dispersion efficiency. LUR modeling is a useful approach for screening studies and can substitute for dispersion models given insufficient input data or dispersion models.

Multiple regression equations are used to describe the relationship between sample locations and environmental variables, often relying on geographic information systems (GIS) to collect measurements. This results in an equation that can predict pollution concentrations at unmeasured locations based on data for the predictor variables in specific locations. A raster graphic image of the area is generated and intersected with area-level population data to formulate the exposure distribution.

== Application examples ==
=== Health impact assessments ===
LUR models were originally developed to assess the exposure resulting from air pollution as a result of vehicular traffic, but they have since been expanded to cover air pollution epidemiology. The EPA has an ongoing grant for these types of assessments, where they collect hourly updates across three major U.S. cities to study how pollution concentrations change over time and track health effects reported by those who live there.

==== Liaoning Province, China ====
A study incorporating annual satellite aerosol optical depth (AOD) observations and five specific canyon indicators (building height, coverage ratio, shape coefficient, floor-area ration, and skyscraper-building ratio) was used to successfully enhance the LUR's modeling accuracy. The area picked for this study had been affected by rapid urbanization which resulted in serious environmental atmospheric pollution and measured a few key pollutants, in particular (PM_{2.5}, PM_{10}, SO_{2}, NO_{2}, NO_{x}, CO, and O_{3}).

==== Ontario, Canada ====
LUR was used to predict the concentration of benzene, toluene, ethylbenzene, m/p-xylene, and o-xylene (BTEX) concentrations in Ontario. 39 locations were monitored for 2 weeks to support LUR models to have predictor variables and best estimate BTEX concentrations.

==== Gothenburg, Sweden ====
A 20-year study examined urban pollution in Gothenburg (an urban area in Sweden) about the NO_{2} concentration. The results were accurate in the effects of altitude and traffic intensity on pollution in a certain region. The model was used to estimate outdoor concentrations in urban areas, but not accurate in less populated regions, such as islands or rural areas.

== Further development ==
LUR can be expanded to encapsulate less studied areas with similar characteristics.

=== Mobile monitoring ===
Mobile monitoring is an alternative to traditional fixed-site measuring systems. Mobile monitoring enables good spatial coverage even with few monitoring devices. Mobile monitoring enables investigations given monetary constraints.

=== Additional prediction variables ===
Adding prediction variables can increase the accuracy and/or explanatory power of LUR models. Examples include holidays traffic variants and seasonal meteorological variations.

=== Geographically weighted models ===
The incorporation of Geographically Weighted Regression (GWR) into LURs involves applying a spatial weighting function to the spatial coordinates that divide a study area into various local neighborhoods. This can reduce the effects of spatial non-stationarity, a defect that occurs when variables form inconsistent relationships over large areas, misrepresenting data points as unchanging.

== Alternatives ==
Alternatives to LUR include kriging, atmospheric dispersion modeling and Bayesian Maximum Entropy modeling.
