= C2-Benzenes =

The C_{2}benzenes are a class of organic aromatic compounds which contain a benzene ring and two other carbon atoms. For the hydrocarbons with no further unsaturation, there are four isomers. There are three xylenes and one ethylbenzene. The substances are:

== Xylenes ==
- o-Xylene (1,2-Dimethylbenzene)
- m-Xylene (1,3-Dimethylbenzene)
- p-Xylene (1,4-Dimethylbenzene)

== Other ==
=== Saturated ===
- Ethylbenzene (not a true xylene but present in mixtures called "mixed xylenes")

=== Unsaturated ===
- Styrene
- Phenylacetylene

== Gallery ==
1,2-Dimethylbenzene

1,3-Dimethylbenzene

1,4-Dimethylbenzene

Ethylbenzene

Styrene

Phenylacetylene
