= Aniline (data page) =

Chemical data page

This page provides supplementary chemical data on aniline.

== Material Safety Data Sheet ==
The handling of this chemical may incur notable safety precautions. It is highly recommend that you seek the Material Safety Datasheet (MSDS) for this chemical from a reliable source and follow its directions.

- Mallinckrodt Baker
- Science Stuff

== Structure and properties ==
Structure and properties
| Dielectric constant, ε_{r} | 6.89 ε_{0} at 20 °C |
| Surface tension | 44.0 dyn/cm at 10 °C; 42.9 dyn/cm at 20 °C; 24.4 dyn/cm at 180 °C |

== Thermodynamic properties ==
Phase behavior
| Triple point | 267.13 K (–6.02 °C), ? Pa |
| Std entropy change of fusion, Δ_{fus}S^{~~o~~} | 39.57 J/(mol·K) at –6.3 °C |
Solid properties
| Std enthalpy change of formation, Δ_{f}H^{~~o~~}_{solid} | ? kJ/mol |
| Standard molar entropy, S^{~~o~~}_{solid} | ? J/(mol K) |
| Heat capacity, c_{p} | ? J/(mol K) |
Liquid properties
Gas properties
| Std enthalpy change of formation, Δ_{f}H^{~~o~~}_{gas} | 87 kJ/mol |
| Standard molar entropy, S^{~~o~~}_{gas} | ? J/(mol K) |
| Heat capacity, c_{p} | 148.7 J/(mol K) at 25 °C |
| van der Waals' constants | a = 2685 L^{2} kPa/mol^{2} b = 0.1369 liter per mole |

== Vapor pressure of liquid ==
| P in mm Hg | 1 | 10 | 40 | 100 | 400 | 760 | 1520 | 3800 | 7600 | 15200 | 30400 | 45600 |
| T in °C | 34.8 | 69.4 | 96.7 | 119.9 | 161.9 | 184.4 | 212.8 | 254.8 | 292.7 | 342.0 | 400.0 | — |

Table data obtained from CRC Handbook of Chemistry and Physics 44th ed.

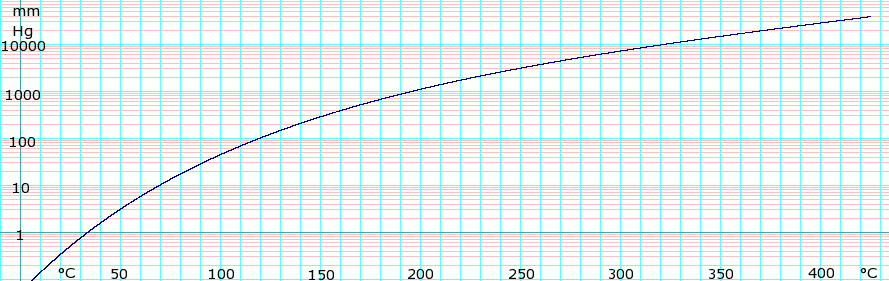
log_{10} of Aniline vapor pressure. Uses formula: $\scriptstyle \log_e P_{mmHg} =$$\scriptstyle \log_e (\frac {760} {101.325}) - 22.11315\log_e(T+273.15) - \frac {13079.73} {T+273.15} + 166.0812 + 1.233275 \times 10^{-5} (T+273.15)^2$ obtained from CHERIC

== Distillation data ==
See also:

- m-xylene (data page)
- p-xylene (data page)

Vapor-liquid Equilibrium for Aniline/Water; P = 745 mm Hg
| BP Temp. °C | % by mole water |
| BP Temp. °C | liquid | vapor |
| 98.5 | | 96.5 |
| 101 | 24.7 | 94.8 |
| 105 | 20.0 | 94.3 |
| 109.8 | 15.3 | 92.4 |
| 115.8 | 11.7 | 89.3 |
| 121 | 9.3 | 86.2 |
| 126 | 7.6 | 81.6 |
| 131 | 5.9 | 75.9 |
| 140 | 4.25 | 70.8 |
| 152 | 2.50 | 60.5 |
| 160 | 1.70 | 48.7 |
| 168 | 1.05 | 34.1 |

Vapor-liquid Equilibrium for Aniline/n-hexane; P = 101.325 kPa
| BP Temp. °C | % by mole hexane |
| BP Temp. °C | liquid | vapor |
| 150.2 | 1.50 | 62.50 |
| 136.4 | 2.50 | 76.00 |
| 116.0 | 5.30 | 88.70 |
| 90.0 | 11.00 | 96.00 |
| 79.5 | 16.85 | 97.66 |
| 75.7 | 20.99 | 98.07 |
| 74.1 | 27.35 | 98.31 |
| 73.25 | 37.90 | 98.42 |
| 73.20 | 52.00 | 98.62 |
| 73.15 | 71.46 | 98.78 |
| 72.15 | 81.26 | 98.93 |
| 71.50 | 86.50 | 99.06 |
| 70.70 | 90.93 | 99.16 |
| 69.80 | 95.32 | 99.36 |
| 69.10 | 97.86 | 99.61 |

== Spectral data ==
UV-Vis
Ionization potential
7.72(62281) eV(cm^{−1})
λ_{max}
230 nm (E_{2}-band)
280 nm (B-band)
Extinction coefficient, ε
8 600 (E_{2}-band)
1 430 (B-band)
IR
Major absorption bands

(liquid film)
| Wave number | transmittance |
| 3663 cm^{−1} | 77% |
| 3429 cm^{−1} | 32% |
| 3354 cm^{−1} | 20% |
| 3214 cm^{−1} | 44% |
| 3088 cm^{−1} | 62% |
| 3072 cm^{−1} | 55% |
| 3037 cm^{−1} | 38% |
| 3010 cm^{−1} | 67% |
| 2930 cm^{−1} | 81% |
| 2904 cm^{−1} | 79% |
| 2640 cm^{−1} | 79% |
| 2627 cm^{−1} | 81% |
| 1929 cm^{−1} | 77% |
| 1839 cm^{−1} | 79% |
| 1705 cm^{−1} | 77% |
| 1621 cm^{−1} | 7% |
| 1601 cm^{−1} | 5% |
| 1557 cm^{−1} | 70% |
| 1525 cm^{−1} | 66% |
| 1496 cm^{−1} | 4% |
| 1467 cm^{−1} | 34% |
| 1332 cm^{−1} | 74% |
| 1312 cm^{−1} | 57% |
| 1277 cm^{−1} | 25% |
| 1176 cm^{−1} | 32% |
| 1154 cm^{−1} | 68% |
| 1053 cm^{−1} | 77% |
| 1028 cm^{−1} | 64% |
| 996 cm^{−1} | 60% |
| 881 cm^{−1} | 53% |
| 754 cm^{−1} | 8% |
| 693 cm^{−1} | 10% |
| 620 cm^{−1} | 47% |
| 529 cm^{−1} | 50% |
| 504 cm^{−1} | 18% |

NMR
Proton NMR

Carbon-13 NMR

Other NMR data

MS
Masses of
main fragments

=== UV Absorbance Spectroscopy of Aniline ===
Aniline is a benzenoid compound. The NH_{2} group attached to the benzene ring means that there is a lone pair of electrons that can enter into conjugation with the benzene ring resulting in delocalization in the aniline.

Aniline absorbs in the K (220 - 250 nm) and the B (250 - 290 nm) bands exhibited by benzenoid compounds. The K and B bands arise from π to π* transitions as a result of the a group containing multiple bond being attached to the benzene ring. When dissolved in ethanol, λ_{max} for aniline is 230 nm, but in dilute aqueous acid λ_{max} is 203 nm. In the latter case the anilinium cation is formed and the lone pair is no longer available for conjugation with the benzene ring. Consequently, the absorption of the molecule shifts to the lower λ_{max} value and behaves like benzene.

== Regulatory data ==
Regulatory data
| Flash point | 70 °C |
| RTECS | ? |
| Autoignition temperature | 615 °C |
