= BTX (chemistry) =

Mixtures of benzene, toluene, and the three xylene isomers

Structural diagrams of the BTX hydrocarbons.

In the petroleum refining and petrochemical industries, the initialism BTX refers to mixtures of benzene, toluene, and the three xylene isomers, all of which are aromatic hydrocarbons. The xylene isomers are distinguished by the designations ortho- (or o-), meta- (or m-), and para- (or p-) as indicated in the adjacent diagram. If ethylbenzene is included, the mixture is sometimes referred to as BTEX.

The BTX aromatics are very important petrochemical materials. Global consumption of benzene, estimated at more than 40,000,000 tons in 2010, showed an unprecedented growth of more than 3,000,000 tons from the level seen in 2009. Likewise, the para-xylene consumption showed unprecedented growth in 2010, growing by 2,800,000 tons, a full ten percent growth from 2009.

Toluene is also a valuable petrochemical for use as a solvent and intermediate in chemical manufacturing processes and as a high octane gasoline component.

== Properties of BTX hydrocarbons ==
The table below lists some of the properties of the BTX aromatic hydrocarbons, all of which are liquids at typical room conditions:

Properties
	benzene	toluene	ethylbenzene	p-xylene	m-xylene	o-xylene
Molecular formula	C_{6}H_{6}	C_{7}H_{8}	C_{8}H_{10}	C_{8}H_{10}	C_{8}H_{10}	C_{8}H_{10}
Molecular mass, g/mol	78.12	92.15	106.17	106.17	106.17	106.17
Boiling point, °C	80.1	110.6	136.2	138.4	139.1	144.4
Melting point, °C	5.5	–95.0	–95.0	13.3	–47.9	25.2

== Production of BTX hydrocarbons ==
BTX content of Pyrolysis Gasoline and Reformate
	Pyrolysis Gasoline		Reformate	
	Standard severity	Medium severity	CCR	SR
BTX content, wt %	58	42	51	42
Benzene, wt % of BTX	48	44	17	14
Toluene, wt % of BTX	33	31	39	39
Xylenes, wt % of BTX	19	25	44	47
CCR = Continuous catalytic regenerative reformer SR = Semi-regenerative catalytic reformer

Benzene, toluene, and xylenes can be made by various processes. However, most BTX production is based on the recovery of aromatics derived from the catalytic reforming of naphtha in a petroleum refinery.

Catalytic reforming usually utilizes a feedstock naphtha that contains non-aromatic hydrocarbons with 6 to 12 carbon atoms and typically produces a reformate product containing C_{6} to C_{8} aromatics (benzene, toluene, xylenes) as well as paraffins and heavier aromatics containing 9 to 12 carbon atoms.

Another process for producing BTX aromatics involves the steam cracking of hydrocarbons which typically produces a cracked naphtha product commonly referred to as pyrolysis gasoline, pyrolysis gas or pygas. The pyrolysis gasoline typically consists of C_{6} to C_{8} aromatics, heavier aromatics containing 9 to 12 carbon atoms, and non-aromatic cyclic hydrocarbons (naphthenes) containing 6 or more carbon atoms.

The adjacent table compares the BTX content of pyrolysis gasoline produced at standard cracking severity or at medium cracking severity with the BTX content of catalytic reformate produced by either a continuous catalytic regenerative (CCR) reformer or by a semi-regenerative catalytic reformer. About 70 percent of the global production of benzene is by extraction from either reformate or pyrolysis gasoline.

The BTX aromatics can be extracted from catalytic reformate or from pyrolysis gasoline by many different methods. Most of those methods, but not all, involve the use of a solvent either for liquid-liquid extraction or extractive distillation. Many different solvents are suitable, including sulfolane (C_{4}H_{8}O_{2}S), furfural (C_{5}H_{4}O_{2}), tetraethylene glycol (C_{8}H_{18}O_{5}), dimethylsulfoxide (C_{2}H_{6}OS), and N-methyl-2-pyrrolidone (C_{5}H_{9}NO).

Below is a schematic flow diagram of one method, involving extractive distillation, for extraction of the BTX aromatics from a catalytic reformate:

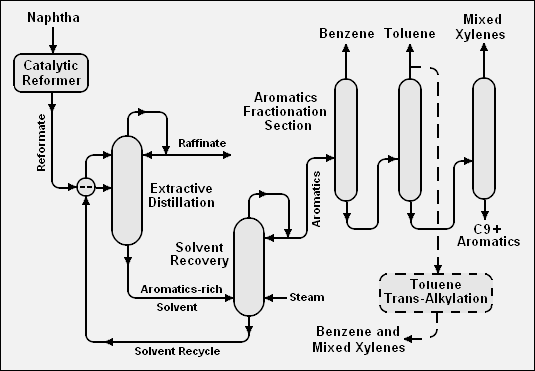
Schematic flow diagram for the extraction of BTX aromatics from a catalytic reformate.

== Petrochemicals produced from BTX ==
There are a very large number of petrochemicals produced from the BTX aromatics. The following diagram shows the chains leading from the BTX components to some of the petrochemicals that can be produced from those components:

Diagram of the chain of petrochemicals derived from the BTX aromatics.

== See also ==
- Aromaticity – Chemical property
- Catalysis – Process of increasing the rate of a chemical reaction
- Pyrolysis – Thermal decomposition of materials
