= M-Xylene (data page) =

Chemical data page

This page provides supplementary chemical data on m-Xylene.

== Material Safety Data Sheet ==
The handling of this chemical may incur notable safety precautions. It is highly recommend that you seek the Material Safety Datasheet (MSDS) for this chemical from a reliable source such as SIRI, and follow its directions.

== Structure and properties ==
Structure and properties
Index of refraction, n_{D}	1.49722 at 20 °C
Abbe number	?
Dielectric constant, ε_{r}	2.374 ε_{0} at 20 °C
Bond strength	?
Bond length	?
Bond angle	?
Magnetic susceptibility	?
Surface tension	31.15 dyn/cm at 0 °C; 28.90 dyn/cm at 20 °C; 20.46 dyn/cm at 100 °C
Viscosity	0.8059 mPa·s at 0 °C; 0.6200 mPa·s at 20 °C; 0.4970 mPa·s at 40 °C; 0.3455 mPa·s at 80 °C; 0.2418 mPa·s at 130 °C
Solubility	0.203 g/L at 0 °C; 0.161 g/L at 25 °C; 0.22 g/L at 40 °C

== Thermodynamic properties ==
Phase behavior
Triple point	219.6 K (–53.5 °C), ? Pa
Critical point	618 K (345 °C), ? Pa
Std enthalpy change of fusion, Δ_{fus}H^{~~o~~}	11.57 kJ/mol
Std entropy change of fusion, Δ_{fus}S^{~~o~~}	51.36 J/(mol·K) at –47.88 °C
Std enthalpy change of vaporization, Δ_{vap}H^{~~o~~}	35.66 kJ/mol at 139.2 °C
Std entropy change of vaporization, Δ_{vap}S^{~~o~~}	? J/(mol·K)
Solid properties
Std enthalpy change of formation, Δ_{f}H^{~~o~~}_{solid}	? kJ/mol
Standard molar entropy, S^{~~o~~}_{solid}	? J/(mol K)
Heat capacity, c_{p}	? J/(mol K)
Liquid properties
Std enthalpy change of formation, Δ_{f}H^{~~o~~}_{liquid}	–25.4 kJ/mol
Standard molar entropy, S^{~~o~~}_{liquid}	253.80 J/(mol K)
Enthalpy of combustion, Δ_{c}H^{~~o~~}	–4549 kJ/mol
Heat capacity, c_{p}	184.5 J/(mol K) at 25 °C
Gas properties
Std enthalpy change of formation, Δ_{f}H^{~~o~~}_{gas}	17.2 kJ/mol
Standard molar entropy, S^{~~o~~}_{gas}	358.2 J/(mol K)
Heat capacity, c_{p}	125.8 J/(mol K)
van der Waals' constants	a = 3076 L^{2} kPa/mol^{2} b = 0.1772 liter per mole

== Vapor pressure of liquid ==
P in mm Hg	1	10	40	100	400	760
T in °C	–6.9	28.3	55.3	76.8	116.7	139.1

Table data obtained from CRC Handbook of Chemistry and Physics 44th ed.

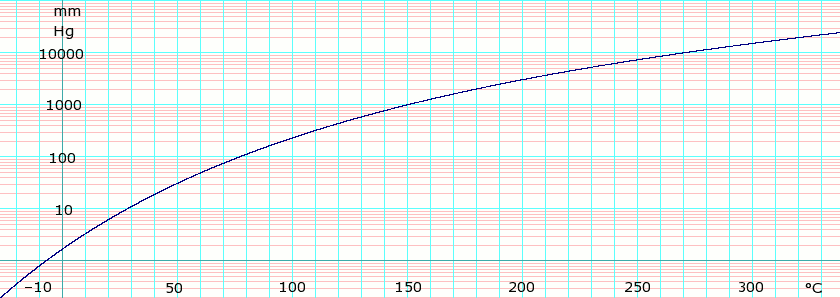
log_{10} of m-Xylene vapor pressure. Uses formula: $\scriptstyle \log_e P_{mmHg} =$$\scriptstyle \log_e (\frac {760} {101.325}) - 9.106679\log_e(T+273.15) - \frac {7556.611} {T+273.15} + 76.86698 + 5.403634 \times 10^{-6} (T+273.15)^2$ obtained from CHERIC

== Distillation data ==
See also:

- p-xylene (data page)
- o-xylene (data page)

Vapor-liquid Equilibrium for m-Xylene/Carbon tetrachloride P = 760 mm Hg
BP Temp. °C	% by mole carbon tetrachloride
BP Temp. °C	liquid	vapor
137.0	1.8	5.8
131.9	6.5	21.9
126.8	11.4	35.6
122.0	16.4	46.5
118.1	20.8	55.2
113.9	25.8	62.6
110.2	30.6	68.7
106.4	35.7	73.9
102.8	41.2	78.8
102.3	41.9	79.6
98.1	48.8	84.3
94.1	56.2	88.0
90.6	63.5	91.1
87.5	70.4	93.5
84.6	77.5	95.5
82.1	84.3	97.1
79.7	91.1	98.4
77.5	97.7	99.6

Vapor-liquid Equilibrium for m-Xylene/Toluene; P = 760 mm Hg
BP Temp. °C	% by mole toluene
BP Temp. °C	liquid	vapor
133.20	11.1	35.8
129.87	18.6	46.2
119.68	52.3	71.8
118.56	56.1	74.1
117.91	59.3	76.0
117.37	62.5	77.9
116.32	67.7	80.2
116.36	68.8	81.6
115.97	69.8	82.2
115.30	73.6	84.4

Vapor-liquid Equilibrium for m-Xylene/Benzene; P = 760 mm Hg
BP Temp. °C	% by mole benzene
BP Temp. °C	liquid	vapor
124.80	10.2	44.7
118.94	17.5	59.8
115.40	21.4	65.5
112.30	28.4	73.2
106.35	34.0	78.0
102.08	42.7	83.3
99.15	49.4	86.5
96.70	59.5	90.3
90.89	68.1	93.0

Vapor-liquid Equilibrium for m-Xylene/Aniline; P = 745 mm Hg
BP Temp. °C	% by mole m-xylene
BP Temp. °C	liquid	vapor
167	10.0	45.5
160	19.5	58.0
153	34.0	71.5
146	53.0	83.0
143	71.5	89.0
141	82.0	93.0

== Spectral data ==
UV-Vis
λ_{max}	? nm
Extinction coefficient, ε	?
IR
Major absorption bands	? cm^{−1}
NMR
Proton NMR
Carbon-13 NMR
Other NMR data
MS
Masses of main fragments

This box:
- Except where noted otherwise, data relate to Standard temperature and pressure.
- Reliability of data general note.
