= Xylene =

Organic compounds with the formula (CH3)2C6H4

The three xylene isomers: o-xylene, m-xylene, and p-xylene

In organic chemistry, xylene or xylol (from Greek ξύλον (xylon) 'wood'; IUPAC name: dimethylbenzene) is any of three organic compounds with the formula (CH_{3})_{2}C_{6}H_{4}. They are derived from the substitution of two hydrogen atoms with methyl groups in a benzene ring; which hydrogens are substituted determines which of three structural isomers results. It is a colorless, flammable, slightly greasy liquid of great industrial value.

The mixture is referred to as both xylene and, more precisely, xylenes. Mixed xylenes refers to a mixture of the xylenes plus ethylbenzene. The four compounds have identical molecular formulas, C_{8}H_{10}. Typically the four compounds are produced together by various catalytic reforming and pyrolysis methods.

== Occurrence and production ==
Xylenes are an important petrochemical produced by catalytic reforming and also by coal carbonisation in the manufacture of coke fuel. They also occur in crude oil in concentrations of about 0.5–1%, depending on the source. Small quantities occur in gasoline and aircraft fuels.

Xylenes are produced mainly as part of the BTX aromatics (benzene, toluene, and xylenes) extracted from the product of catalytic reforming known as reformate.

Several million tons are produced annually. In 2011, a global consortium began construction of one of the world's largest xylene plants in Singapore.

== History ==
Xylene was first isolated and named in 1850 by the French chemist Auguste Cahours (1813–1891), having been discovered as a constituent of wood tar.

== Industrial production ==
Xylenes are produced by the methylation of toluene and benzene. Commercial or laboratory-grade xylene produced usually contains about 40–65% of m-xylene and up to 20% each of o-xylene, p-xylene and ethylbenzene. The ratio of isomers can be shifted to favor the highly valued p-xylene via the patented UOP-Isomar process or by transalkylation of xylene with itself or trimethylbenzene. These conversions are catalyzed by zeolites.

ZSM-5 is used to facilitate some isomerization reactions leading to mass production of modern plastics.

== Properties ==
The physical properties of the isomers of xylene differ slightly. The melting point ranges from −47.87 °C (−54.17 °F) (m-xylene) to 13.26 °C (55.87 °F) (p-xylene)—as usual, the para isomer's melting point is much higher because it packs more readily in the crystal structure. The boiling point for each isomer is around 140 °C (284 °F). The density of each isomer is around 0.87 g/mL (7.3 lb/US gal; 8.7 lb/imp gal) and thus is less dense than water. The odor of xylene is detectable at concentrations as low as 0.08 to 3.7 ppm (parts of xylene per million parts of air) and can be tasted in water at 0.53 to 1.8 ppm.

Xylene isomers
General
Common name	Xylenes (mixture)	o-Xylene	m-Xylene	p-Xylene
Systematic name	Dimethylbenzene	1,2-Dimethylbenzene	1,3-Dimethylbenzene	1,4-Dimethylbenzene
Other names	Xylol	o-Xylol; Orthoxylene	m-Xylol; Metaxylene	p-Xylol; Paraxylene
Molecular formula	C_{8}H_{10}			
SMILES		Cc1c(C)cccc1	Cc1cc(C)ccc1	Cc1ccc(C)cc1
Molar mass	106.16 g/mol			
Appearance	Clear, colorless liquid			
CAS number	[1330-20-7]	[95-47-6]	[108-38-3]	[106-42-3]
Properties
Density and phase	0.864 g/mL, liquid	0.88 g/mL, liquid	0.86 g/mL, liquid	0.86 g/mL, liquid
Solubility in water	Practically insoluble			
Soluble in non-polar solvents such as aromatic hydrocarbons
Melting point	−47.4 °C (−53.3 °F; 225.8 K)	−25 °C (−13 °F; 248 K)	−48 °C (−54 °F; 225 K)	13 °C (55 °F; 286 K)
Boiling point	138.5 °C (281.3 °F; 411.6 K)	144 °C (291 °F; 417 K)	139 °C (282 °F; 412 K)	138 °C (280 °F; 411 K)
Viscosity		0.812 cP at 20 °C (68 °F)	0.62 cP at 20 °C (68 °F)	0.34 cP at 30 °C (86 °F)
Hazards
SDS	Xylenes	o-Xylene	m-Xylene	p-Xylene
EU pictograms	(GHS02: Flammable) (GHS07: Exclamation mark) (GHS08: Health hazard)			
NFPA 704	2 3 0			
Flash point	30 °C (86 °F)	17 °C (63 °F)	25 °C (77 °F)	25 °C (77 °F)
H & P phrases	H225, H226, H304, H312, H315, H319, H332, H335, H412 P210, P233, P240, P241, P242, P243, P261, P264, P271, P273, P280, P301+P310, P302+P352, P303+P361+P353, P304+P312, P304+P340, P305+P351+P338, P312, P321, P322, P331, P332+P313, P337+P313, P362, P363, P370+P378, P403+P233, P403+P235, P405, P501			
RTECS number		ZE2450000	ZE2275000	ZE2625000
Related compounds
Related aromatic hydrocarbons	Toluene, mesitylene, benzene, ethylbenzene			
Related compounds	Xylenols – types of phenols			
Except where noted otherwise, data are given for materials in their standard state (at 25 °C, 100 kPa); Infobox disclaimer and references

Xylenes form azeotropes with water and a variety of alcohols. The azeotrope with water consists of 60% xylenes and boils at 94.5 °C. As with many alkylbenzene compounds, xylenes form complexes with various halocarbons. The complexes of different isomers often have dramatically different properties from each other.

== Applications ==
=== Terephthalic acid and related derivatives ===
p-Xylene is the principal precursor to terephthalic acid and dimethyl terephthalate, both monomers used in the production of polyethylene terephthalate (PET) plastic bottles and polyester clothing. 98% of p-xylene production, and half of all xylenes produced is consumed in this manner. o-Xylene is an important precursor to phthalic anhydride. The demand for isophthalic acid is relatively modest, so m-xylene is rarely sought (and hence the utility of its conversion to the o- and p-isomers).

=== Solvent applications and industrial purposes ===
Xylenes are used as a solvent in printing, rubber, and leather industries. It is a common component of ink, rubber, and adhesives. In thinning paints and varnishes, it can be substituted for toluene where slower drying is desired, and thus is used by conservators of art objects in solubility testing. Similarly it is a cleaning agent, e.g., for steel, silicon wafers, and integrated circuits. In dentistry, xylene can be used to dissolve gutta percha, a material used for endodontics (root-canal treatments). In the petroleum industry, xylene is also a frequent component of paraffin solvents, used when the tubing becomes clogged with paraffin wax. It was formerly used in permanent markers as solvent for the ink, but was replaced with alcohol-based formulas in the early 1990s. This allowed markers to be made entirely of plastic, as there no longer was a risk of dissolving plastic. It also eliminated glass tubes in markers for storing ink, which were replaced with polyester felt or plastic tubes.

=== Laboratory use ===
Xylene is used in the laboratory to make baths with dry ice to cool reaction vessels, and as a solvent to remove synthetic immersion oil from the microscope objective in light microscopy. In histology, xylene is the most widely used clearing agent. Xylene is used to remove paraffin from dried microscope slides prior to staining. After staining, microscope slides are put in xylene prior to mounting with a coverslip.

=== Precursor to other compounds ===
In one large-scale application, para-xylene is converted to terephthalic acid. The major application of ortho-xylene is as a precursor to phthalate esters, used as plasticizer. Meta-xylene is converted to isophthalic acid derivatives, which are components of alkyd resins.

== Chemical properties ==
Generally, two kinds of reactions occur with xylenes: those involving the methyl groups and those involving the ring C–H bonds. Being benzylic and hence weakened, the C–H bonds of the methyl groups are susceptible to free-radical reactions, including halogenation to the corresponding xylene dichlorides (bis(chloromethyl)benzenes), while mono-bromination yields xylyl bromide, a tear gas agent. Oxidation and ammoxidation also target the methyl groups, affording dicarboxylic acids and the dinitriles. Electrophiles attack the aromatic ring, leading to chloro- and nitroxylenes.

== Health and safety ==
Xylene is flammable but of modest acute toxicity, with LD_{50} ranges from 200 to 5000 mg/kg for animals. Oral LD_{50} for rats is 4300 mg/kg. The principal mechanism of detoxification is oxidation to methylbenzoic acid and hydroxylation to hydroxylene.

The main effect of inhaling xylene vapor is depression of the central nervous system (CNS), with symptoms such as headache, dizziness, nausea and vomiting. At an exposure of 100 ppm, one may experience nausea or a headache. At an exposure between 200 and 500 ppm, symptoms can include feeling "high", dizziness, weakness, irritability, vomiting, and slowed reaction time.

The side effects of exposure to low concentrations of xylene (< 200 ppm) are reversible and do not cause permanent damage. Long-term exposure may lead to headaches, irritability, depression, insomnia, agitation, extreme tiredness, tremors, hearing loss, impaired concentration and short-term memory loss. A condition called chronic solvent-induced encephalopathy, commonly known as "organic-solvent syndrome" has been associated with xylene exposure. There is very little information available that isolates xylene from other solvent exposures in the examination of these effects.

Hearing disorders have been also linked to xylene exposure, both from studies with experimental animals, as well as clinical studies.

Xylene is also a skin irritant and strips the skin of its oils, making it more permeable to other chemicals. The use of impervious gloves and masks, along with respirators where appropriate, is recommended to avoid occupational health issues from xylene exposure.

Xylenes are metabolized to methylhippuric acids. The presence of methylhippuric acid can be used as a biomarker to determine exposure to xylene.

== See also ==
- Alkylbenzene – Family of organic compounds
- C2-Benzenes
- Hydrodealkylation – Chemical reaction
- Transalkylation – Chemical reaction which transfers an alkyl group between molecules
- Xylene cyanol – Dye used as an electrophoretic color marker
