= P-Xylene (data page) =

Chemical data page

This page provides supplementary chemical data on p-xylene.

== Material Safety Data Sheet ==
The handling of this chemical may incur notable safety precautions. It is highly recommend that you seek the Material Safety Datasheet (MSDS) for this chemical from a reliable source and follow its directions.

- MATHESON TRI-GAS, INC.

== Structure and properties ==
Structure and properties
Index of refraction, n_{D}	1.4958 at 20 °C
Dielectric constant, ε_{r}	2.2 ε_{0} at 20 °C
Surface tension	29.92 dyn/cm at 5 °C; 28.27 dyn/cm at 20 °C; 24.2 dyn/cm at 60 °C
Viscosity	0.7385 mPa·s at 10 °C; 0.6475 mPa·s at 20 °C; 0.5134 mPa·s at 40 °C; 0.3519 mPa·s at 80 °C; 0.2424 mPa·s at 130 °C
Solubility	0.160 g/L at 0 °C; 0.181 g/L at 25 °C; 0.22 g/L at 40 °C

== Thermodynamic properties ==
Phase behavior
Triple point	286.3 K (13.15 °C), ? Pa
Critical point	617 K (344 °C), 3500 kPa
Std enthalpy change of fusion, Δ_{fus}H^{~~o~~}	17.1 kJ/mol
Std entropy change of fusion, Δ_{fus}S^{~~o~~}	59.8 J/(mol·K)
Std enthalpy change of vaporization, Δ_{vap}H^{~~o~~}	35.7 kJ/mol at 138 °C
Std entropy change of vaporization, Δ_{vap}S^{~~o~~}	? J/(mol·K)
Solid properties
Std enthalpy change of formation, Δ_{f}H^{~~o~~}_{solid}	? kJ/mol
Standard molar entropy, S^{~~o~~}_{solid}	? J/(mol K)
Heat capacity, c_{p}	? J/(mol K)
Liquid properties
Std enthalpy change of formation, Δ_{f}H^{~~o~~}_{liquid}	−24.4 kJ/mol
Standard molar entropy, S^{~~o~~}_{liquid}	247 J/(mol K)
Enthalpy of combustion, Δ_{c}H^{~~o~~}	−4552 kJ/mol
Heat capacity, c_{p}	181.7 J/(mol K)
Gas properties
Std enthalpy change of formation, Δ_{f}H^{~~o~~}_{gas}	1.796000E+04 kJ/kg-mol at 25 °C
Standard molar entropy, S^{~~o~~}_{gas}	? J/(mol K)
Heat capacity, c_{p}	163.2 J/(mol K) at 120 °C
van der Waals' constants	a = 3134 L^{2} kPa/mol^{2} b = 0.1809 liter per mole

== Vapor pressure of liquid ==
P in mm Hg	1	10	40	100	400	760
T in °C	−8.1	27.3	54.4	75.9	115.9	138.3

Table data obtained from CRC Handbook of Chemistry and Physics 44th ed.

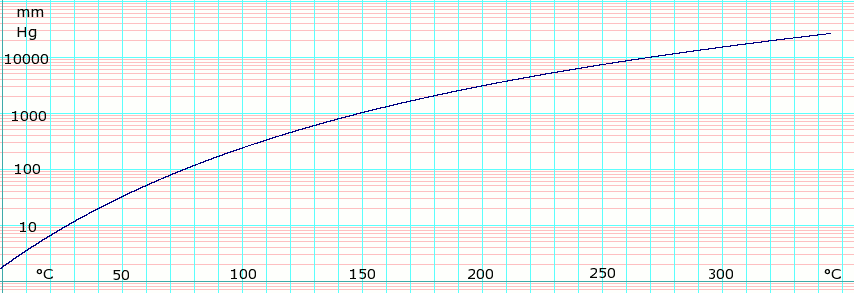
log_{10} of p-Xylene vapor pressure. Uses formula: $\scriptstyle \log_e P_{mmHg} =$$\scriptstyle \log_e (\frac {760} {101.325}) - 9.527348\log_e(T+273.15) - \frac {7637.951} {T+273.15} + 79.55720 + 5.748969 \times 10^{-6} (T+273.15)^2$ obtained from CHERIC

== Distillation data ==
Vapor-liquid Equilibrium for p-Xylene/o-Xylene; P = 26.66 kPa
BP Temp. °C	% by mole p-xylene
BP Temp. °C	liquid	vapor
100.1	0.0	0.0
99.8	4.9	5.8
99.5	9.9	11.8
99.0	17.4	20.7
98.5	25.1	29.3
98.1	32.6	37.1
97.6	40.6	44.9
97.2	48.6	53.8
96.7	56.9	61.8
96.2	64.9	69.6
95.8	73.1	77.3
95.4	81.4	84.5
94.9	90.7	91.6
94.6	95.4	96.0
94.4	100.0	100.0

Vapor-liquid Equilibrium for p-Xylene/m-Xylene; P = 26.66 kPa
BP Temp. °C	% by mole p-xylene
BP Temp. °C	liquid	vapor
95.30	0.0	0.0
95.20	8.3	8.5
95.15	15.5	15.8
95.05	24.3	24.9
95.00	33.0	33.6
94.90	40.9	41.7
94.85	49.0	49.7
94.75	57.1	57.9
94.70	65.3	66.1
94.60	73.8	74.3
94.55	81.7	82.2
94.50	89.5	89.9
94.45	94.8	94.8
94.40	100.0	100.0

Vapor-liquid Equilibrium for p-Xylene/carbon tetrachloride P = 760 mm Hg
BP Temp. °C	% by mole carbon tetrachloride
BP Temp. °C	liquid	vapor
136.4	1.7	5.9
131.1	6.3	21.6
126.2	11.1	34.9
121.8	15.7	45.3
117.6	20.3	53.9
113.5	25.2	61.6
109.8	30.1	67.9
106.2	35.1	73.1
102.7	40.5	77.9
102.2	41.3	78.7
98.1	48.5	83.6
94.4	55.8	87.6
91.1	62.9	90.8
88.0	70.1	93.4
85.2	77.2	95.4
82.6	84.0	96.9
80.0	91.1	98.4
77.6	97.7	99.7

Vapor-liquid Equilibrium for p-Xylene/Butanone; P = 760 mm Hg
BP Temp. °C	% by mole butanone
BP Temp. °C	liquid	vapor
129.45	4.8	20.8
125.42	7.9	31.7
123.25	10.2	38.1
116.80	16.1	51.1
112.44	21.0	59.4
105.55	30.5	71.0
101.15	38.7	75.5
95.30	50.6	85.2
93.90	54.6	87.2
89.45	67.0	91.7
86.55	77.0	94.7
85.02	81.5	95.9
84.58	83.1	96.2
80.65	97.0	994

Vapor-liquid Equilibrium for p-Xylene/Aniline; P = 745 mm Hg
BP Temp. °C	% by mole p-xylene
BP Temp. °C	liquid	vapor
171	7.5	37.0
165	14.0	50.0
156	26.5	67.5
148	48.5	80.0
142	72.5	89.0
140	83.0	92.0

== Spectral data ==
UV-Vis
Spectrum
λ_{max}	? nm
Extinction coefficient, ε	?
IR
Spectrum	NIST
Major absorption bands	793.94 cm^{−1}
NMR
Spectrum	AIST
Proton NMR	2.296, 7.046
Carbon-13 NMR	134.66, 128.97, 20.90
MS
Spectrum	NIST
Masses of main fragments	106, 91, 77

This box:
- Except where noted otherwise, data relate to Standard temperature and pressure.
- Reliability of data general note.
