= Pyrolysis gasoline =

Naphtha-range product with high aromatics content

Pyrolysis gasoline or pygas is a naphtha-range product with high aromatics content. It is a by-product of high temperature naphtha cracking during ethylene and propylene production, a high octane number mixture that contains aromatics from the aromatization reactions, olefins, and paraffins ranging from C5s to C12s. The mixture has its own CAS Number: 68477-58-7.

Pygas has high potential for use as a gasoline blending mixture and/or as a source of aromatics. Currently, pygas is generally used as a gasoline blending mixture due to its high octane number. Depending on the feedstock used to produce the olefins, steam cracking can produce a benzene-rich liquid by-product called pyrolysis gasoline. Pyrolysis gasoline can be blended with other hydrocarbons as a gasoline additive, or distilled (in BTX process) to separate it into its components, including benzene.

Raw pyrolysis gasoline (RPG, raw pygas) is rich in benzene and is usually subjected to hydrogenation. Hydrogenated pyrolysis gasoline (HPG, hydrogenated pygas) is a common feedstock of BTX plants for benzene and toluene extraction.
