= O-Xylylene dibromide =

Identifiers
CAS Number	91-13-4
3D model (JSmol)	Interactive image
ChemSpider	60032
ECHA InfoCard	100.001.857
EC Number	202-042-7
PubChem CID	66665
UNII	9FRJ55E5UL
CompTox Dashboard (EPA)	DTXSID2059019
- InChI: InChI=1S/C8H8Br2/c9-5-7-3-1-2-4-8(7)6-10/h1-4H,5-6H2 Key: KGKAYWMGPDWLQZ-UHFFFAOYSA-N
- SMILES: C1=CC=C(C(=C1)CBr)CBr

Properties
Chemical formula	C_{8}H_{8}Br_{2}
Molar mass	263.960 g·mol^{−1}
Appearance	off-white solid
Melting point	93–94 °C (199–201 °F; 366–367 K)

Hazards
- Occupational safety and health (OHS/OSH)
Main hazards	lachrymator
- GHS labelling
Pictograms	(GHS05: Corrosive) (GHS07: Exclamation mark)
Signal word	Danger
Hazard statements	H302, H314
Precautionary statements	P260, P264, P270, P280, P301+P312, P301+P330+P331, P303+P361+P353, P304+P340, P305+P351+P338, P310, P321, P330, P363, P405, P501
- Except where otherwise noted, data are given for materials in their standard state (at 25 °C [77 °F], 100 kPa). Infobox references

Xylylene dibromide is an organic compound with the formula C_{6}H_{4}(CH_{2}Br)_{2}. It is an off-white solid that, like other benzyl halides, is strongly lachrymatory. It is a useful reagent owing to the convenient reactivity of the two C-Br bonds. Two other isomers are known, para- and meta-xylylene dibromide.

== Synthesis ==
It is prepared by the photochemical reaction of ortho-xylene with bromine:

C_{6}H_{4}(CH_{3})_{2} + 2 Br_{2} → C_{6}H_{4}(CH_{2}Br)_{2} + 2 HBr

== Reactions ==
Further bromination gives the tetrabromide:

C_{6}H_{4}(CH_{2}Br)_{2} + 2 Br_{2} → C_{6}H_{4}(CHBr_{2})_{2} + 2 HBr

Upon reaction with thiourea followed by hydrolysis of the intermediate bisisothiouronium salts, xylylene dibromide can be converted to the dithiol C_{6}H_{4}(CH_{2}SH)_{2}.

Xylylene dibromide is a precursor to the ephemeral molecule ortho-quinonedimethane, also known as xylylene. This species can be trapped when the dehalogenation is conducted in the presence of iron carbonyl.

Coupling of xylylene dibromide by treatment with lithium metal gives dibenzocyclooctane, precursor to dibenzocyclooctatetraene.

== Related compounds ==
- Xylylene dichloride, the dichloro analogue of the title compound.
- Benzyl bromide, the simplest benzylic bromide.
