= Dibenzocyclooctatetraene =

Names
- Other names Dibenzo[a,e]cyclooctatetraene, Dibenzo[a,e]cyclooctene, DBCOT

Identifiers
CAS Number	262-89-5
3D model (JSmol)	Interactive image
ChemSpider	4525126
PubChem CID	5375696
- InChI: InChI=1S/C16H12/c1-2-6-14-11-12-16-8-4-3-7-15(16)10-9-13(14)5-1/h1-12H/b10-9-,12-11-,13-9?,14-11?,15-10?,16-12? Key: VGQWCQNHAMVTJY-RKUAQPHYSA-N
- SMILES: C1=CC=C/2C(=C1)/C=C\C3=CC=CC=C3/C=C2

Properties
Chemical formula	C_{16}H_{12}
Molar mass	204.272 g·mol^{−1}
Appearance	colorless crystals
Melting point	108.5–109.2 °C (227.3–228.6 °F; 381.6–382.3 K)
- Except where otherwise noted, data are given for materials in their standard state (at 25 °C [77 °F], 100 kPa). Infobox references

Dibenzocyclooctatetraene is an organic compound with the formula (C_{6}H_{4})_{2}(C_{2}H_{2})_{2}. It is the bis(benzo) derivative of both cyclooctatetraene and 1,5-cyclooctadiene. The compound has received much attention as a strongly chelating diolefin ligand.

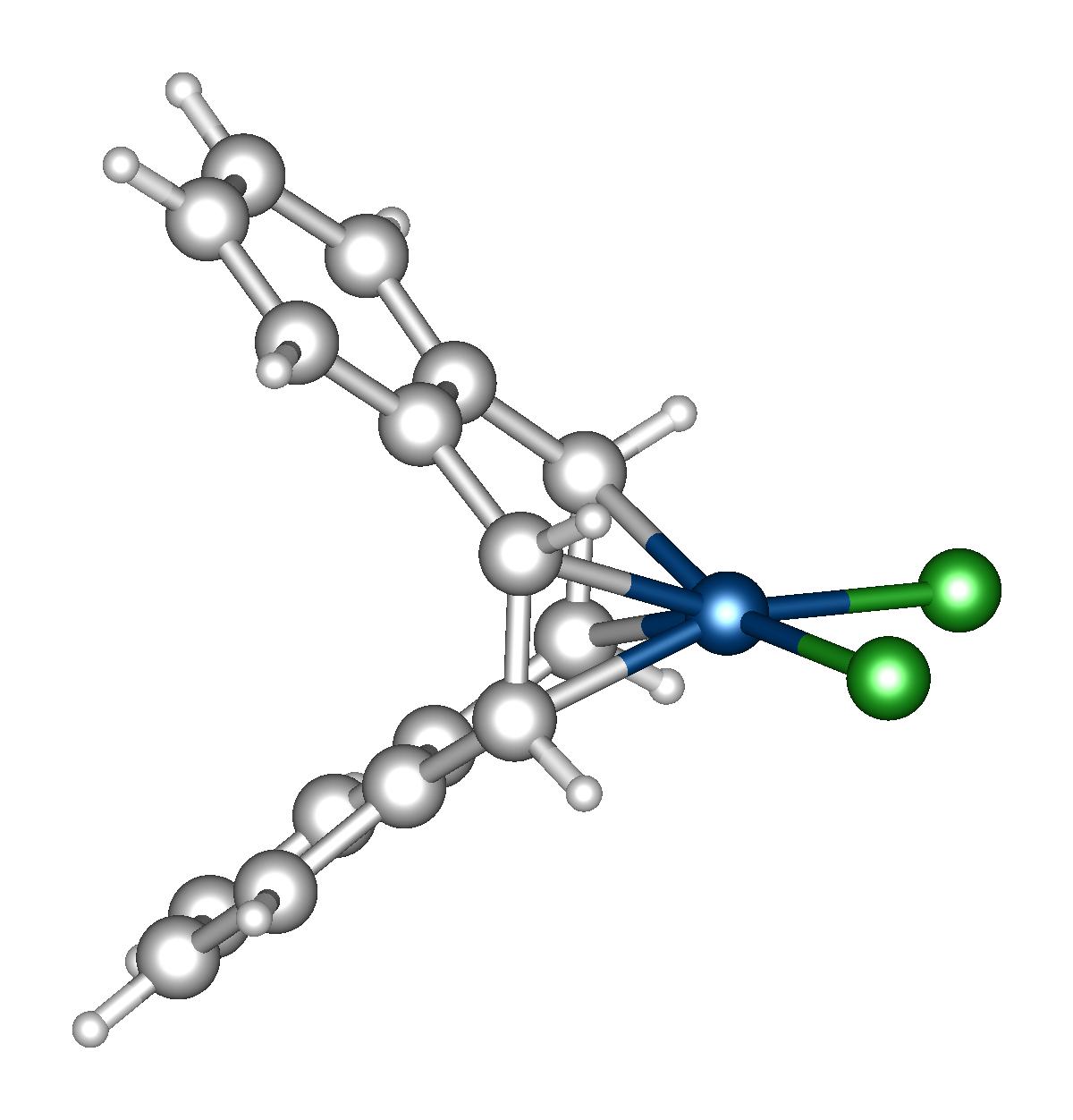
Structure of PtCl_{2}(DBCOT). Color code: dark blue=Pt, gray = C, green = Cl.

The compound can be made by coupling of xylylene dibromide to dibenzocyclooctane, which then can be converted to the diolefin.
