= Tetrachloro-m-xylene =

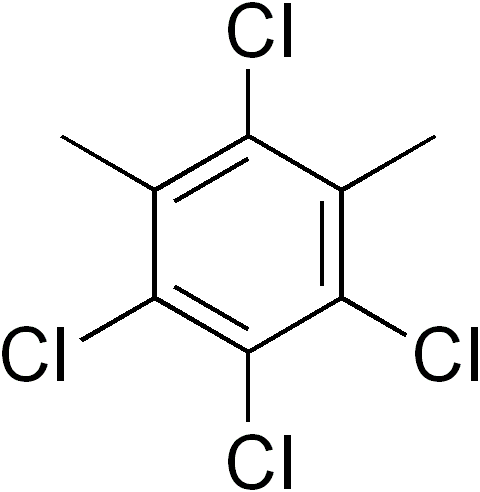
Skeletal formula of TCMX
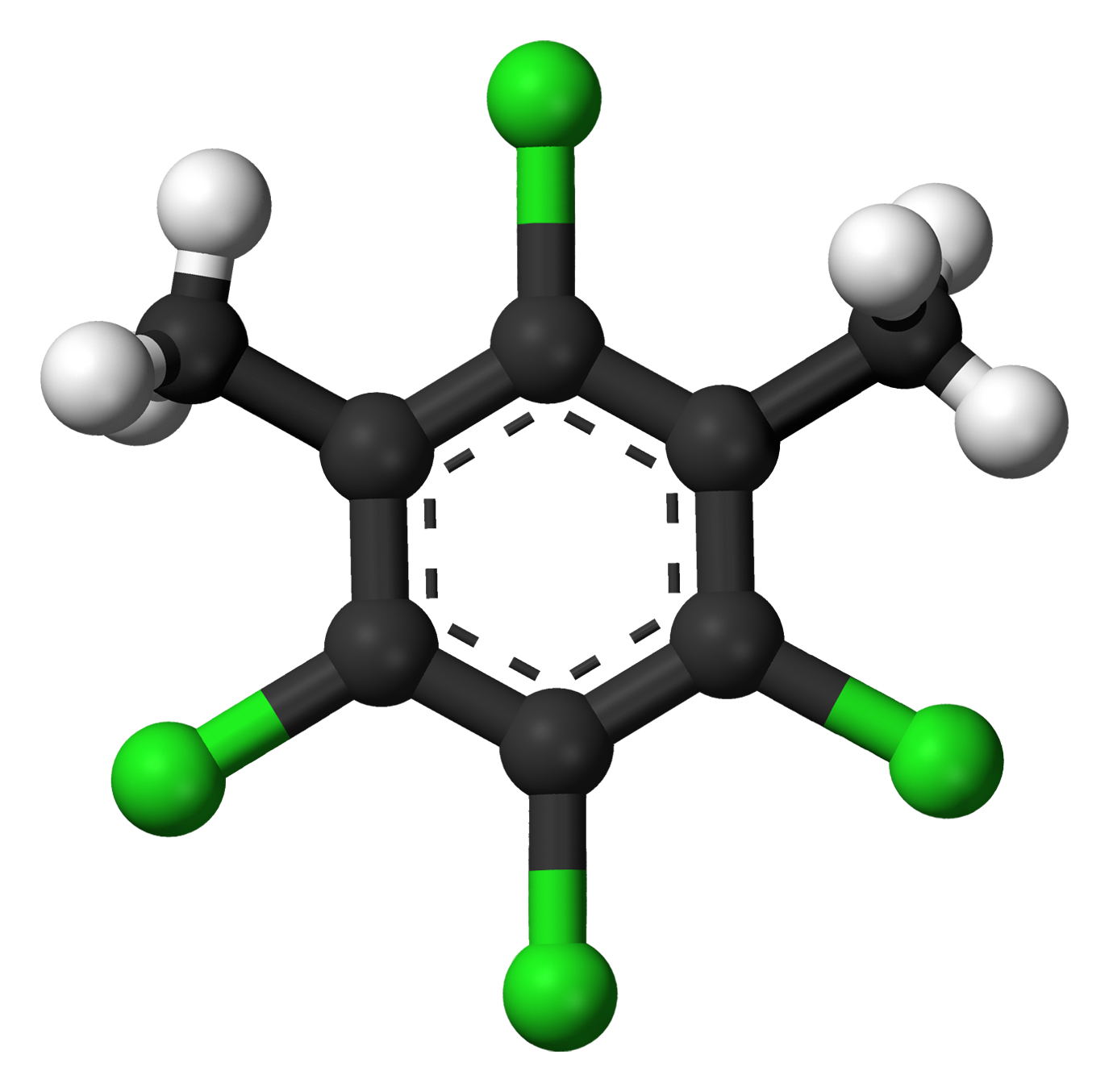
Ball-and-stick model of TCMX

Names
- Preferred IUPAC name 1,2,3,5-Tetrachloro-4,6-dimethylbenzene
- Other names Tetrachlorometaxylene; 2,4,5,6-Tetrachlorometaxylene

Identifiers
CAS Number	877-09-8
3D model (JSmol)	Interactive image
Abbreviations	TCMX
ChemSpider	63327
ECHA InfoCard	100.011.715
EC Number	212-886-8
PubChem CID	70139
UNII	O8XMK3B4S9
CompTox Dashboard (EPA)	DTXSID6075433
- InChI: InChI=1S/C8H6Cl4/c1-3-5(9)4(2)7(11)8(12)6(3)10/h1-2H3 Key: NTUBJKOTTSFEEV-UHFFFAOYSA-N; InChI=1/C8H6Cl4/c1-3-5(9)4(2)7(11)8(12)6(3)10/h1-2H3 Key: NTUBJKOTTSFEEV-UHFFFAOYAN
- SMILES: Clc1c(c(Cl)c(c(Cl)c1Cl)C)C

Properties
Chemical formula	C_{8}H_{6}Cl_{4}
Molar mass	243.94524
Appearance	colorless or white solid
Melting point	223 °C (433 °F; 496 K)
- Except where otherwise noted, data are given for materials in their standard state (at 25 °C [77 °F], 100 kPa). verify (what is ?) Infobox references

Tetrachloro-m-xylene (tetrachlorometaxylene, or TCMX) is the organochlorine compound with the formula C_{6}Cl_{4}(CH_{3})_{2}. It is the chlorinated derivative of m-xylene in which the four aromatic hydrogen atoms are replaced by chlorine. It is prepared by ferric chloride-catalyzed reaction of the xylene with chlorine.

TCMX is used as an internal standard in the analysis of organochlorides, particularly organochloride pesticides.
