= Aniline leather =

Type of leather dyed exclusively with soluble dyes

Aniline leather is a type of leather dyed exclusively with soluble dyes. The dye colours the leather without producing the uniform surface of a topcoat paint or insoluble pigmented sealant, as on other leathers, and so retains the hide's natural surface. Hence, any visible variations on the surface of the undyed leather such as visible pores, scars, or other blemishes will remain visible. For this reason, only high-quality leather is suitable for aniline finishing.

Originally, the dyes used for this process were synthesized from aniline through chemical reactions. These dyes used to be called 'aniline dyes' or 'tar dyes'. In modern times, the dyes used are subject to laws and regulations in many countries, and the use of certain azo compounds is prohibited in the European Union as there are reasons to assume health risks.

Aniline leather may be referred to as "full aniline" to differentiate between this dye treatment and variants. Semi-aniline leather is produced through a very similar process to full-aniline, but has a thin protective top coat added to protect it from wear and staining. Pull-up aniline leather has additional oil or wax applied to the leather to give it a distressed look.
