= Aniline point =

The aniline point of an oil is defined as the minimum temperature at which equal volumes of aniline (C_{6}H_{5}NH_{2}) and lubricant oil are miscible, i.e. form a single phase upon mixing.

The value gives an approximation for the content of aromatic compounds in the oil, since the miscibility of aniline, which is also an aromatic compound suggests the presence of similar (i.e. aromatic) compounds in the oil. The lower the aniline point, the greater is the content of aromatic compounds in the oil.

The aniline point serves as a reasonable proxy for aromaticity of oils consisting mostly of saturated hydrocarbons (i.e. alkanes, paraffins) or unsaturated compounds (mostly aromatics). Significant chemical functionalization of the oil (chlorination, sulfonation, etc.) can interfere with the measurement, due to changes to the solvency of the functionalized oil.

Aniline point indicates if an oil is likely to damage elastomers (rubber compounds) that come in contact with the oil.

== Determination of aniline point ==
Equal volumes of aniline and oil are stirred continuously in a test tube and heated until the two merge into a homogeneous solution. Heating is stopped and the tube is allowed to cool. The temperature at which the two phases separate out is recorded as aniline point.

== See also ==
- Lubricant
- Grease (lubricant)
- Oil analysis
- Viscosity index
- Saponification value
- Cloud point
- Pour point
- Flash point
- Fire point
- Softening point
- Glass transition temperature (Tg)
