= P-Xylene =

p-Xylene
- Skeletal formula Skeletal formula

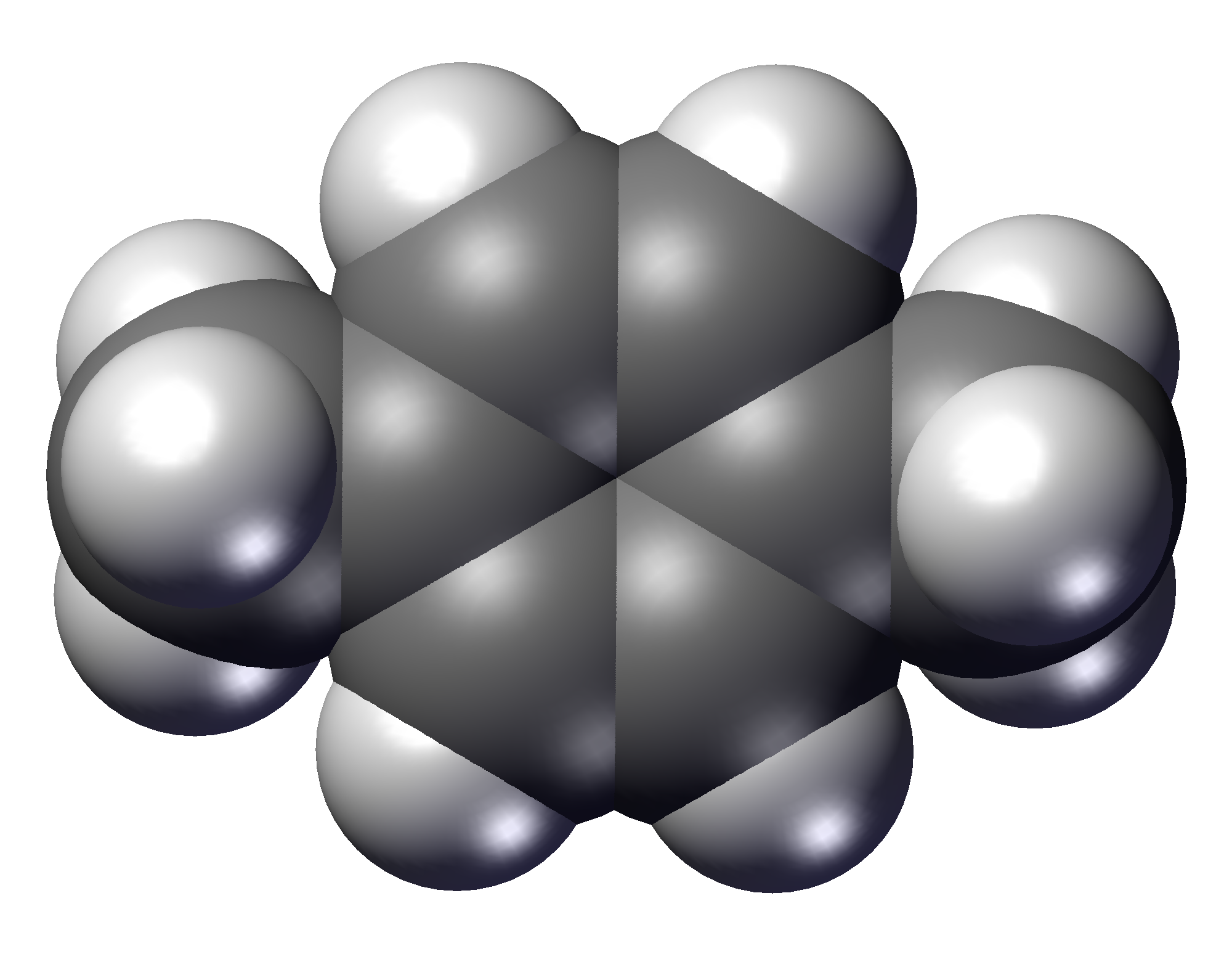
- Space-filling model Space-filling model

Names
- Preferred IUPAC name 1,4-Xylene
- Systematic IUPAC name 1,4-dimethylbenzene
- Other names p-Xylene, p-dimethylbenzene; p-xylol; 1,4-xylene; p-methyltoluene; paraxylene; chromar; scintillar; 4-methyltoluene; NSC 72419; or 1,4-dimethylbenzene.

Identifiers
CAS Number	106-42-3
3D model (JSmol)	Interactive image
Beilstein Reference	1901563
ChEBI	CHEBI:27417
ChEMBL	ChEMBL31561
ChemSpider	7521
ECHA InfoCard	100.003.088
EC Number	203-396-5
Gmelin Reference	2697
KEGG	C06756
PubChem CID	7809
RTECS number	ZE2625000
UNII	6WAC1O477V
CompTox Dashboard (EPA)	DTXSID2021868
- InChI: InChI=1S/C8H10/c1-7-3-5-8(2)6-4-7/h3-6H,1-2H3 Key: URLKBWYHVLBVBO-UHFFFAOYSA-N; InChI=1/C8H10/c1-7-3-5-8(2)6-4-7/h3-6H,1-2H3 Key: URLKBWYHVLBVBO-UHFFFAOYAE
- SMILES: CC1=CC=C(C)C=C1

Properties
Chemical formula	C_{8}H_{10}
Molar mass	106.168 g·mol^{−1}
Appearance	Colorless liquid
Odor	Aromatic
Density	0.861 g/mL
Melting point	13.2 °C (55.8 °F; 286.3 K)
Boiling point	138.35 °C (281.03 °F; 411.50 K)
Solubility in water	Insoluble
Solubility in ethanol	Very soluble
Solubility in diethyl ether	Very soluble
Vapor pressure	9 mmHg (20 °C)
Magnetic susceptibility (χ)	−76.78·10^{−6} cm^{3}/mol
Refractive index (n_{D})	1.49582
Viscosity	0.7385 cP at 0 °C; 0.6475 cP at 20 °C
Dipole moment	0.00 D

Hazards
- Occupational safety and health (OHS/OSH)
Main hazards	Harmful or if swallowed. Vapor maybe toxic. Flammable liquid and vapor.
- GHS labelling
Pictograms	(GHS02: Flammable) (GHS07: Exclamation mark) (GHS08: Health hazard)
Signal word	Danger
Hazard statements	H226, H302, H304, H312, H315, H319, H332, H335, H412
Precautionary statements	P210, P233, P240, P241, P242, P243, P261, P264, P271, P273, P280, P301+P310, P302+P352, P303+P361+P353, P304+P312, P304+P340, P305+P351+P338, P312, P321, P322, P331, P332+P313, P337+P313, P362, P363, P370+P378, P403+P233, P403+P235, P405, P501
NFPA 704 (fire diamond)	2 3 0
Flash point	27 °C (81 °F; 300 K)
Autoignition temperature	528 °C (982 °F; 801 K)
Explosive limits	1.1%-7.0%
Threshold limit value (TLV)	100 ppm (TWA), 150 ppm (STEL)
- Lethal dose or concentration (LD, LC)
LD_{50} (median dose)	4300 mg/kg
LC_{50} (median concentration)	4550 ppm (rat, 4 hr)
LC_{Lo} (lowest published)	3401 ppm (mouse)
- NIOSH (US health exposure limits)
PEL (Permissible)	TWA 100 ppm (435 mg/m^{3})
REL (Recommended)	TWA 100 ppm (435 mg/m^{3}) ST 150 ppm (655 mg/m^{3})
IDLH (Immediate danger)	900 ppm
Safety data sheet (SDS)	External MSDS

Related compounds
Related aromatic hydrocarbons	benzene toluene o-xylene m-xylene

Supplementary data page
- P-Xylene (data page)
- Except where otherwise noted, data are given for materials in their standard state (at 25 °C [77 °F], 100 kPa). verify (what is ?) Infobox references

p-Xylene (para-xylene) is an aromatic hydrocarbon. It is one of the three isomers of dimethylbenzene known collectively as xylenes. The p- stands for para-, indicating that the two methyl groups in p-xylene occupy the diametrically opposite substituent positions 1 and 4. It is in the positions of the two methyl groups, their arene substitution pattern, that it differs from the other isomers, o-xylene and m-xylene. All have the same chemical formula C_{6}H_{4}(CH_{3})_{2}. All xylene isomers are colorless and highly flammable. The odor threshold of p-xylene is 0.62 parts per million (ppm).

== Production ==
The production of p-xylene is industrially significant, with annual demand estimated at 37 million tons in 2014, and still on the increase. p-Xylene is produced by catalytic reforming of petroleum naphtha as part of the BTX aromatics (benzene, toluene and the xylene isomers) extracted from the catalytic reformate. The p-xylene is then separated out in a series of distillation, adsorption or crystallization and reaction processes from the m-xylene, o-xylene, and ethylbenzene. Its melting point is the highest among this series of isomers, but simple crystallization does not allow easy purification due to the formation of eutectic mixtures.

Such separation procedures are major cost factors in the production of p-xylene, and the search for alternative methods continues. For example, a reverse-osmosis technique has been proposed to improve various aspects of the processes.

== Industrial applications ==
p-Xylene is an important chemical feedstock. Among other industrial applications, it is a raw material in the large scale synthesis of various polymers. In particular it is a component in the production of terephthalic acid for polyesters such as polyethylene terephthalate (generally known as PET). It also may be polymerised directly to produce parylene.

== Toxicity and exposure ==
Xylenes are not acutely toxic, for example the LD_{50} (rat, oral) is 4300 mg/kg. Effects vary with animal and xylene isomer.

Concerns with xylenes focus on narcotic effects. Overexposure of p-xylene in humans can cause headache, fatigue, dizziness, listlessness, confusion, irritability, gastrointestinal disturbances including nausea and loss of appetite, flushing of the face, and a feeling of increased body heat. p-Xylene vapor exposure over the recommended exposure limit of 100 parts per million (ppm) can cause irritation to eye, nose, and throat and possible chest tightening and an abnormal gait.

p-Xylene occurs naturally in petroleum and coal tar. It is emitted by most combustion sources, including automobile exhaust and tobacco smoke.

=== Inhalation ===
Inhaling p-xylene can cause dizziness, headache, drowsiness, and nausea. If exposure through inhalation occurs, first aid includes fresh air, rest and possible medical attention. Through the use of ventilation or breathing protection, exposure to p-xylene through inhalation can be prevented.

=== Skin ===
Exposure of p-xylene through the skin can cause dry skin and redness. If skin exposure occurs, first aid includes rinsing and then washing the affected area with soap and water as well as removing any contaminated clothing and thoroughly cleaning and drying before reuse. Exposure can be prevented through the use of protective gloves.

=== Eyes ===
Exposure of p-xylene to eyes can cause redness and pain. If eyes are exposed, first aid includes rinsing of the eyes with water for several minutes, removal of contact lenses if applicable, and medical attention. Eye exposure can be prevented through the use of safety glasses or safety goggles.

=== Ingestion ===
Ingestion of p-xylene can result in a burning sensation, abdominal pain, dizziness, drowsiness, headache, and nausea. If p-xylene is ingested one's mouth should be rinsed and vomiting should not be induced. Further medical attention should be sought. Ingestion can be prevented by not eating, drinking, or smoking when working with p-xylene.

=== Short-term exposure ===
p-Xylene can cause issues with the central nervous system and if swallowed could cause chemical pneumonitis when breathed into the lungs.

=== Long-term exposure ===
Liquid p-xylene exposure to the skin over long periods of time can remove the fat from the skin. The substance may also have effects on the central nervous system. Exposure can enhance hearing loss caused by noise exposure. Animal tests suggest that this substance could cause damage to human development and reproductive systems.
