= Xylylene dichloride =

- 1,2-, 1,3-, and 1,4-xylylene dichloride

Identifiers
CAS Number	1,4: 623-25-6; 1,3: 626-16-4; 1,2: 612-12-4
3D model (JSmol)	1,4: Interactive image; 1,3: Interactive image; 1,2: Interactive image
ChemSpider	1,4: 11671; 1,3: 21168838; 1,2: 21111896
PubChem CID	1,4: 12171; 1,3: 12275; 1,2: 11919
UNII	1,4: 55E5A3M473
UN number	2928, 2811
- InChI: 1,4: InChI=1S/C8H8Cl2/c9-5-7-1-2-8(6-10)4-3-7/h1-4H,5-6H2 Key: ZZHIDJWUJRKHGX-UHFFFAOYSA-N; 1,3: InChI=1S/C8H8Cl2/c9-5-7-2-1-3-8(4-7)6-10/h1-4H,5-6H2 Key: GRJWOKACBGZOKT-UHFFFAOYSA-N; 1,2: InChI=1S/C8H8Cl2/c9-5-7-3-1-2-4-8(7)6-10/h1-4H,5-6H2 Key: FMGGHNGKHRCJLL-UHFFFAOYSA-N
- SMILES: 1,4: C1=CC(=CC=C1CCl)CCl; 1,3: C1=CC(=CC(=C1)CCl)CCl; 1,2: C1=CC=C(C(=C1)CCl)CCl

Properties
Chemical formula	C_{8}H_{8}Cl_{2}
Molar mass	175.05 g·mol^{−1}
Density	1.202
Melting point	34–37 °C (93–99 °F; 307–310 K)

Hazards
- GHS labelling
Pictograms	(GHS05: Corrosive) (GHS06: Toxic) (GHS07: Exclamation mark) (GHS09: Environmental hazard)
Signal word	Danger
Hazard statements	H302, H314, H315, H317, H319, H330, H410
Precautionary statements	P260, P264, P270, P271, P272, P273, P280, P284, P301+P312, P301+P330+P331, P302+P352, P303+P361+P353, P304+P340, P305+P351+P338, P310, P320, P321, P330, P332+P313, P333+P313, P337+P313, P362, P363, P391, P403+P233, P405, P501
- Except where otherwise noted, data are given for materials in their standard state (at 25 °C [77 °F], 100 kPa). Infobox references

The chemical compound xylylene dichloride (C_{6}H_{4}(CH_{2}Cl)_{2}) is a white to light yellow sandlike solid. This compound can be classified as a benzyl halide. Xylylene dichloride is used as a vulcanizing agent to harden rubbers. It catalyzes the crosslinking of phenolic resins.

== Structure and reactivity ==
The structure of xylylene dichloride is characterized by an benzene ring with two chloromethyl groups and four hydrogen atoms bound to it. The chloromethyl groups can be located on different sites on the ring, leading to a few different possible forms. These forms are:

- o-xylylene dichloride: 1,2-bis(chloromethyl)benzene
- m-xylylene dichloride: 1,3-bis(chloromethyl)benzene
- p-xylylene dichloride: 1,4-bis(chloromethyl)benzene

The reactive groups of xylylene dichloride are the two CH_{2}Cl groups.

== Synthesis ==
Xylylene dichloride can be synthesized from benzenedimethanol by reaction with hydrogen chloride. It has also been produced by photochemical chlorination of ortho-xylene.

== Related compounds ==
- Xylylene dibromide, the dibromo analogue of the title compound.
