= Entropy of vaporization =

Increase in entropy during vaporization of a liquid

In thermodynamics, the entropy of vaporization is the increase in entropy upon vaporization of a liquid. This is always positive, since the degree of disorder increases in the transition from a liquid in a relatively small volume to a vapor or gas occupying a much larger space. At standard pressure $P^\ominus$ = 1 bar, the value is denoted as $\Delta S^\ominus _\text{vap}$ and normally expressed in joules per mole-kelvin, J/(mol·K).

For a phase transition such as vaporization or fusion (melting), both phases may coexist in equilibrium at constant temperature and pressure, in which case the difference in Gibbs free energy is equal to zero:

$$\Delta G_\text{vap} = \Delta H_\text{vap} - T_\text{vap} \times \Delta S_\text{vap} = 0,$$

where $\Delta H_\text{vap}$ is the heat or enthalpy of vaporization. Since this is a thermodynamic equation, the symbol $T$ refers to the absolute thermodynamic temperature, measured in kelvins (K). The entropy of vaporization is then equal to the heat of vaporization divided by the boiling point:

$$\Delta S_\text{vap} = \frac{\Delta H_\text{vap}}{T_\text{vap}}.$$

According to Trouton's rule, the entropy of vaporization (at standard pressure) of most liquids has similar values. The typical value is variously given as 85 J/(mol·K), 88 J/(mol·K) and 90 J/(mol·K). Hydrogen-bonded liquids have somewhat higher values of $\Delta S^\ominus _\text{vap}.$

== See also ==
- Entropy of fusion
