= Catalytic reforming =

Chemical process used in oil refining

Catalytic reforming is a chemical process used to convert naphthas from crude oil into liquid products called reformates, which are premium "blending stocks" for high-octane gasoline. The process converts low-octane linear hydrocarbons (paraffins) into branched alkanes (isoparaffins) and cyclic naphthenes, which are then partially dehydrogenated to produce high-octane aromatic hydrocarbons. The dehydrogenation also produces significant amounts of byproduct hydrogen gas, which is fed into other refinery processes such as hydrocracking and hydrodesulfurization. A side reaction is hydrogenolysis, which produces light hydrocarbons of lower value, such as methane, ethane, propane and butanes.

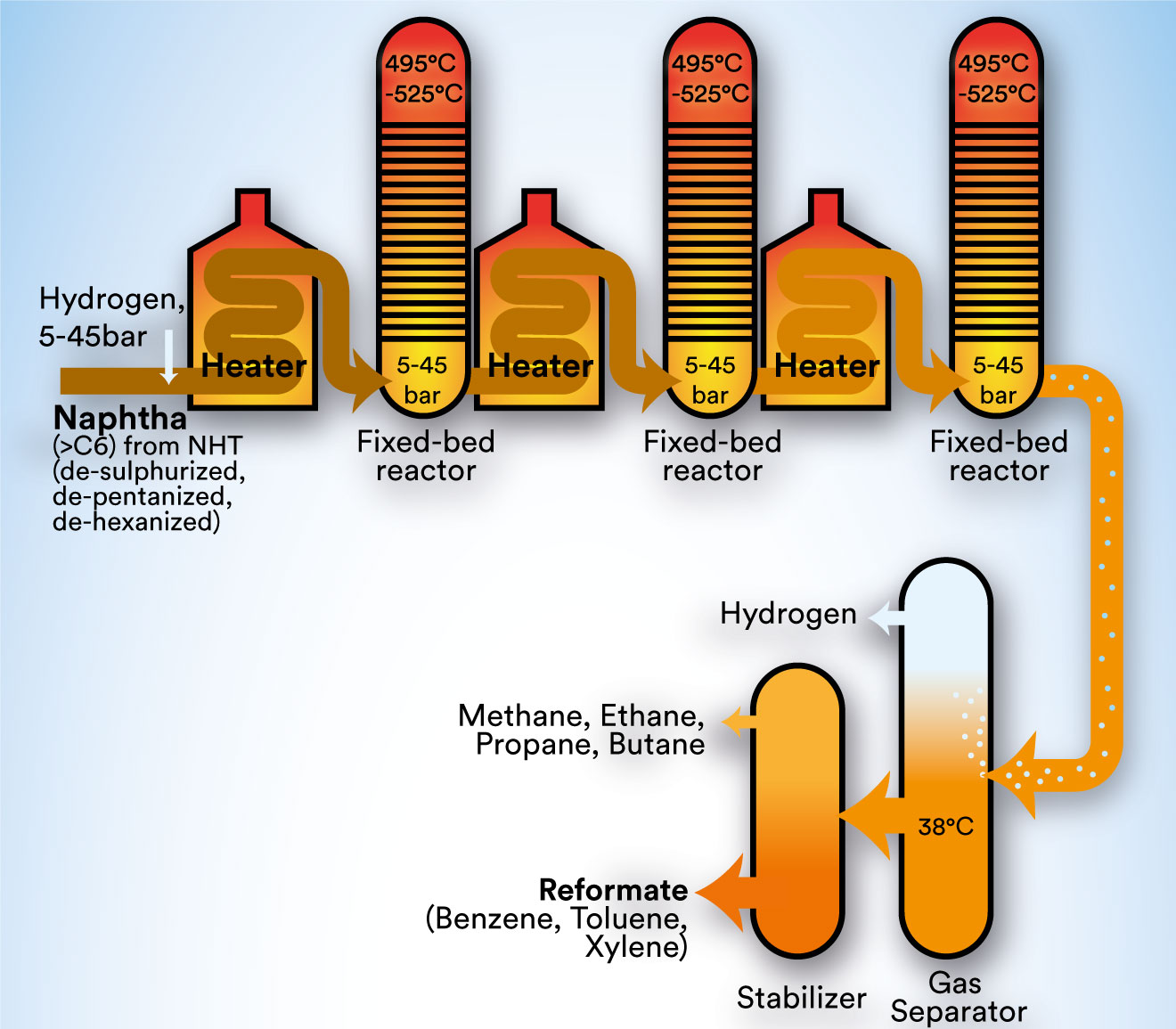
Continuous catalytic reforming (CCR) unit

In addition to a gasoline blending stock, reformate is the main source of aromatic bulk chemicals such as benzene, toluene, xylene and ethylbenzene, which have diverse uses, most importantly as raw materials for conversion into plastics. However, the benzene content of reformate makes it carcinogenic, which has led to governmental regulations effectively requiring further processing to reduce its benzene content.

Catalytic reforming is quite different from and not to be confused with the catalytic steam reforming process used industrially to produce products such as hydrogen, ammonia, and methanol from natural gas, naphtha or other petroleum-derived feedstocks. Nor is this process to be confused with various other catalytic reforming processes that use methanol or biomass-derived feedstocks to produce hydrogen for fuel cells or other uses.

== History ==
In the 1940s, Vladimir Haensel, a research chemist working for Universal Oil Products (UOP), developed a catalytic reforming process using a catalyst containing platinum. Haensel's process was subsequently commercialized by UOP in 1949 for producing a high octane gasoline from low octane naphthas and the UOP process become known as the Platforming process. The first Platforming unit was built in 1949 at the refinery of the Old Dutch Refining Company in Muskegon, Michigan.

In the years since then, many other versions of the process have been developed by some of the major oil companies and other organizations. Today, the large majority of gasoline produced worldwide is derived from the catalytic reforming process.

To name a few of the other catalytic reforming versions that were developed, all of which utilized a platinum and/or a rhenium catalyst:

- Rheniforming: Developed by Chevron.
- CCR Platforming: A Platforming version, designed for continuous catalyst regeneration, developed by Universal Oil Products (UOP).
- Powerforming: Developed by Esso, currently known as ExxonMobil.
- Magnaforming: Developed by Engelhard and Atlantic Richfield Oil Company.
- Ultraforming: Developed by Standard Oil of Indiana, now a part of BP.
- Houdriforming: Developed by the Houdry Process Corporation.
- Octanizing: A catalytic reforming version developed by Axens, a subsidiary of the French Institute of Petroleum (IFP), designed for continuous catalyst regeneration.

== Typical naphtha feedstocks ==
A petroleum refinery includes many unit operations and unit processes. The first unit operation in a refinery is the continuous distillation of the petroleum crude oil being refined. The overhead liquid distillate is called naphtha and will become a major component of the refinery's gasoline (petrol) product after it is further processed through a catalytic hydrodesulfurizer to remove sulfur-containing hydrocarbons and a catalytic reformer to reform its hydrocarbon molecules into more complex molecules with a higher octane rating value. The naphtha is a mixture of very many different hydrocarbon compounds. It has an initial boiling point of about 35 °C (95 °F) and a final boiling point of about 200 °C (392 °F), and it contains paraffin, naphthene (cyclic paraffins) and aromatic hydrocarbons ranging from those containing 6 carbon atoms to those containing about 10 or 11 carbon atoms.

The naphtha from the crude oil distillation is often further distilled to produce a "light" naphtha containing most (but not all) of the hydrocarbons with 6 or fewer carbon atoms and a "heavy" naphtha containing most (but not all) of the hydrocarbons with more than 6 carbon atoms. The heavy naphtha has an initial boiling point of about 140 to 150 °C (284 to 302 °F) and a final boiling point of about 190 to 205 °C (374 to 401 °F). The naphthas derived from the distillation of crude oils are referred to as "straight-run" naphthas.

It is the straight-run heavy naphtha that is usually processed in a catalytic reformer because the light naphtha has molecules with 6 or fewer carbon atoms which, when reformed, tend to crack into butane and lower molecular weight hydrocarbons which are not useful as high-octane gasoline blending components. Also, the molecules with 6 carbon atoms tend to form aromatics which is undesirable because governmental environmental regulations in a number of countries limit the amount of aromatics (most particularly benzene) that gasoline may contain.

There are a great many petroleum crude oil sources worldwide and each crude oil has its own unique composition or "assay". Also, not all refineries process the same crude oils and each refinery produces its own straight-run naphthas with their own unique initial and final boiling points. In other words, naphtha is a generic term rather than a specific term.

The table just below lists some fairly typical straight-run heavy naphtha feedstocks, available for catalytic reforming, derived from various crude oils. It can be seen that they differ significantly in their content of paraffins, naphthenes and aromatics:

Typical Heavy Naphtha Feedstocks
Crude oil name $\Rightarrow$ Location $\Rightarrow$	Barrow Island Australia	Mutineer-Exeter Australia	CPC Blend Kazakhstan	Draugen North Sea
Initial boiling point, °C	149	140	149	150
Final boiling point, °C	204	190	204	180
Paraffins, liquid volume %	46	62	57	38
Naphthenes, liquid volume %	42	32	27	45
Aromatics, liquid volume %	12	6	16	17

Some refinery naphthas include olefinic hydrocarbons, such as naphthas derived from the fluid catalytic cracking and coking processes used in many refineries. Some refineries may also desulfurize and catalytically reform those naphthas. However, for the most part, catalytic reforming is mainly used on the straight-run heavy naphthas, such as those in the above table, derived from the distillation of crude oils.

== Reactions ==
Many chemical reactions occur in the catalytic reforming process. All require the presence of a catalyst, almost always platinum-containing, and a high partial pressure of hydrogen. Depending upon the type or version of catalytic reforming used as well as the desired reaction severity, the reaction conditions range from temperatures of about 495 to 525 °C (923 to 977 °F) and from pressures of about 5 to 45 standard atmospheres (510 to 4,560 kPa).

The four major catalytic reforming reactions are:

The dehydrogenation of naphthenes to convert them into aromatics as exemplified in the conversion methylcyclohexane (a naphthene) to toluene (an aromatic):

noice

The isomerization of normal (meaning straight chain) paraffins to isoparaffins as exemplified in the conversion of normal octane to 2,5-dimethylhexane (an "isoparaffin"):

The dehydrogenation and aromatization of paraffins to aromatics (commonly called dehydrocyclization) as exemplified in the conversion of normal heptane to toluene:

The hydrocracking of paraffins into smaller molecules as exemplified by the cracking of normal heptane into isopentane and ethane:

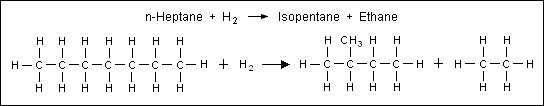

During the reforming reactions, the carbon number of the reactants remains unchanged, except for hydrocracking reactions which break down the hydrocarbons. The hydrocracking of paraffins is the only one of the above four major reforming reactions that consumes hydrogen. The isomerization of normal paraffins does not consume or produce hydrogen. However, both the dehydrogenation of naphthenes and the dehydrocyclization of paraffins produce hydrogen. The overall net production of hydrogen in the catalytic reforming of petroleum naphthas ranges from about 50 to 200 cubic meters of hydrogen gas (at 0 °C and 1 atm) per cubic meter of liquid naphtha feedstock. In the United States customary units, that is equivalent to 300 to 1200 cubic feet of hydrogen gas (at 60 °F and 1 atm) per barrel of liquid naphtha feedstock. In many petroleum refineries, the net hydrogen produced in catalytic reforming supplies a significant part of the hydrogen used elsewhere in the refinery (for example, in hydrodesulfurization processes). The hydrogen is also necessary in order to hydrogenolyze any polymers that form on the catalyst.

In practice, the higher the content of naphthenes in the naphtha feedstock, the better will be the quality of the reformate and the higher the production of hydrogen. Crude oils containing the best naphtha for reforming are typically from Western Africa or the North Sea, such as Bonny light oil or Norwegian Troll.

== Process description ==
The most commonly used type of catalytic reforming unit has three reactors, each with a fixed bed of catalyst, and all of the catalyst is regenerated in situ during routine catalyst regeneration shutdowns which occur approximately once each 6 to 24 months. Such a unit is referred to as a semi-regenerative catalytic reformer (SRR).

Some catalytic reforming units have an extra spare or swing reactor and each reactor can be individually isolated so that any one reactor can be undergoing in situ regeneration while the other reactors are in operation. When that reactor is regenerated, it replaces another reactor which, in turn, is isolated so that it can then be regenerated. Such units, referred to as cyclic catalytic reformers, are not very common. Cyclic catalytic reformers serve to extend the period between required shutdowns.

The latest and most modern type of catalytic reformers are called continuous catalyst regeneration (CCR) reformers. Such units are defined by continuous in-situ regeneration of part of the catalyst in a special regenerator, and by continuous addition of the regenerated catalyst to the operating reactors. As of 2006, two CCR versions available: UOP's CCR Platformer process and Axens' Octanizing process. The installation and use of CCR units is rapidly increasing.

Many of the earliest catalytic reforming units (in the 1950s and 1960s) were non-regenerative in that they did not perform in situ catalyst regeneration. Instead, when needed, the aged catalyst was replaced by fresh catalyst and the aged catalyst was shipped to catalyst manufacturers to be either regenerated or to recover the platinum content of the aged catalyst. Very few, if any, catalytic reformers currently in operation are non-regenerative.

The process flow diagram below depicts a typical semi-regenerative catalytic reforming unit.

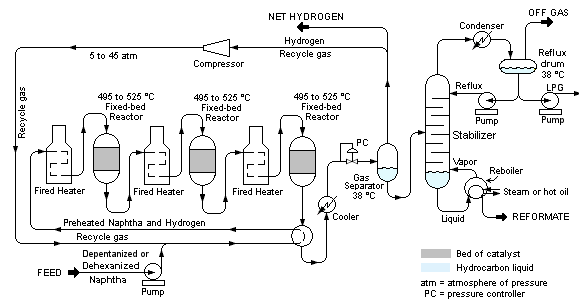
Schematic diagram of a typical semi-regenerative catalytic reformer unit in a petroleum refinery

The liquid feed (at the bottom left in the diagram) is pumped up to the reaction pressure (5–45 standard atmospheres [510–4,560 kPa]) and is joined by a stream of hydrogen-rich recycle gas. The resulting liquid–gas mixture is preheated by flowing through a heat exchanger. The preheated feed mixture is then totally vaporized and heated to the reaction temperature (495–520 °C [923–968 °F]) before the vaporized reactants enter the first reactor. As the vaporized reactants flow through the fixed bed of catalyst in the reactor, the major reaction is the dehydrogenation of naphthenes to aromatics (as described earlier herein) which is highly endothermic and results in a large temperature decrease between the inlet and outlet of the reactor. To maintain the required reaction temperature and the rate of reaction, the vaporized stream is reheated in the second fired heater before it flows through the second reactor. The temperature again decreases across the second reactor and the vaporized stream must again be reheated in the third fired heater before it flows through the third reactor. As the vaporized stream proceeds through the three reactors, the reaction rates decrease and the reactors therefore become larger. At the same time, the amount of reheat required between the reactors becomes smaller. Usually, three reactors are all that is required to provide the desired performance of the catalytic reforming unit.

Some installations use three separate fired heaters as shown in the schematic diagram and some installations use a single fired heater with three separate heating coils.

The hot reaction products from the third reactor are partially cooled by flowing through the heat exchanger where the feed to the first reactor is preheated and then flow through a water-cooled heat exchanger before flowing through the pressure controller (PC) into the gas separator.

Most of the hydrogen-rich gas from the gas separator vessel returns to the suction of the recycle hydrogen gas compressor and the net production of hydrogen-rich gas from the reforming reactions is exported for use in the other refinery processes that consume hydrogen (such as hydrodesulfurization units and/or a hydrocracker unit).

The liquid from the gas separator vessel is routed into a fractionating column commonly called a stabilizer. The overhead offgas product from the stabilizer contains the byproduct methane, ethane, propane and butane gases produced by the hydrocracking reactions as explained in the above discussion of the reaction chemistry of a catalytic reformer, and it may also contain some small amount of hydrogen. That offgas is routed to the refinery's central gas processing plant for removal and recovery of propane and butane. The residual gas after such processing becomes part of the refinery's fuel gas system.

The bottoms product from the stabilizer is the high-octane liquid reformate that will become a component of the refinery's product gasoline.

Reformate can be blended directly in the gasoline pool but often it is separated in two or more streams. A common refining scheme consists in fractionating the reformate in two streams, light and heavy reformate. The light reformate has lower octane and can be used as isomerization feedstock if this unit is available. The heavy reformate is high in octane and low in benzene, hence it is an excellent blending component for the gasoline pool.

Benzene is often removed with a specific operation to reduce the content of benzene in the reformate as the finished gasoline has often an upper limit of benzene content (in the UE this is 1% volume). The benzene extracted can be marketed as feedstock for the chemical industry.

== Catalysts and mechanisms ==
Most catalytic reforming catalysts contain platinum with or without some rhenium on a silica or silica-alumina support base. Fresh catalyst is chlorided (chlorinated) prior to use.

The noble metals (platinum and rhenium) are catalytic sites for the dehydrogenation reactions and the chlorinated alumina provides the acid sites needed for isomerization, cyclization and hydrocracking reactions. Chlorination requires finesse, lest it affect the Pt or Re component. The platinum and/or rhenium are very susceptible to poisoning by sulfur and nitrogen compounds. Therefore, the naphtha feedstock to a catalytic reformer is always pre-processed in a hydrodesulfurization unit which removes both the sulfur and the nitrogen compounds. Most catalysts require both sulphur and nitrogen content to be lower than 1 ppm.

The activity (i.e., effectiveness) of the catalyst in a semi-regenerative catalytic reformer is reduced over time during operation by carbonaceous coke deposition and chloride loss. The activity of the catalyst can be periodically regenerated or restored by in situ high temperature oxidation of the coke followed by chlorination. Semi-regenerative catalytic reformers are regenerated about once per 6 to 24 months. The higher the severity of the reacting conditions (temperature), the higher the octane of the produced reformate but also the shorter the duration between two regenerations. Catalyst's cycle duration is also dependent on the feedstock. However, independently of the crude oil used in the refinery, all catalysts require a maximum final boiling point of the naphtha feedstock of 180 °C (356 °F).

Normally, the catalyst can be regenerated perhaps 3 or 4 times before it must be returned to the manufacturer for reclamation of the valuable platinum and/or rhenium content.

== Weaknesses and competition ==
The sensitivity of catalytic reforming to contamination by sulfur and nitrogen requires hydrotreating the naphtha before it enters the reformer, adding to the cost and complexity of the process.

Dehydrogenation, an important component of reforming, is a strongly endothermic reaction, and as such, requires the reactor vessel to be externally heated. This contributes both to costs and the emissions of the process. Catalytic reforming has a limited ability to process naphthas with a high content of normal paraffins, e.g. naphthas from the gas-to-liquids (GTL) units.

The reformate has a much higher content of benzene than is permissible by the current regulations in many countries. This means that the reformate should either be further processed in an aromatics extraction unit, or blended with appropriate hydrocarbon streams with low content of aromatics.

Catalytic reforming requires a whole range of other processing units at the refinery (apart from the distillation tower, a naphtha hydrotreater, usually an isomerization unit to process light naphtha, an aromatics extraction unit, etc.) which puts it out of reach for smaller (micro-)refineries.

Main licensors of catalytic reforming processes, UOP and Axens, constantly work on improving the catalysts, but the rate of improvement seems to be reaching its physical limits. This is driving the emergence of new technologies to process naphtha into gasoline by companies like Chevron Phillips Chemical (Aromax and NGT Synthesis (Methaforming,).
