= Entropy of fusion =

Increase in entropy when a solid melts

In thermodynamics, the entropy of fusion is the increase in entropy when melting a solid substance. This is almost always positive since the degree of disorder increases in the transition from an organized crystalline solid to the disorganized structure of a liquid; the only known exception is helium. It is denoted as $\Delta S_{\text{fus}}$ and normally expressed in joules per mole-kelvin, J/(mol·K).

A natural process such as a phase transition will occur when the associated change in the Gibbs free energy is negative.

$$\Delta G_{\text{fus}} = \Delta H_{\text{fus}} - T \times \Delta S_{\text{fus}} < 0,$$

where $\Delta H_\text{fus}$ is the enthalpy of fusion. Since this is a thermodynamic equation, the symbol $T$ refers to the absolute thermodynamic temperature, measured in kelvins (K).

Equilibrium occurs when the temperature is equal to the melting point $T = T_f$ so that

$$\Delta G_{\text{fus}} = \Delta H_{\text{fus}} - T_f \times \Delta S_{\text{fus}} = 0,$$

and the entropy of fusion is the heat of fusion divided by the melting point:

$$\Delta S_{\text{fus}} = \frac {\Delta H_{\text{fus}}} {T_f}$$

== Helium ==
Helium-3 has a negative entropy of fusion at temperatures below 0.3 K. Helium-4 also has a very slightly negative entropy of fusion below 0.8 K. This means that, at appropriate constant pressures, these substances freeze with the addition of heat.

== See also ==
- Entropy of vaporization
