= O-Xylene =

o-Xylene
Skeletal formula
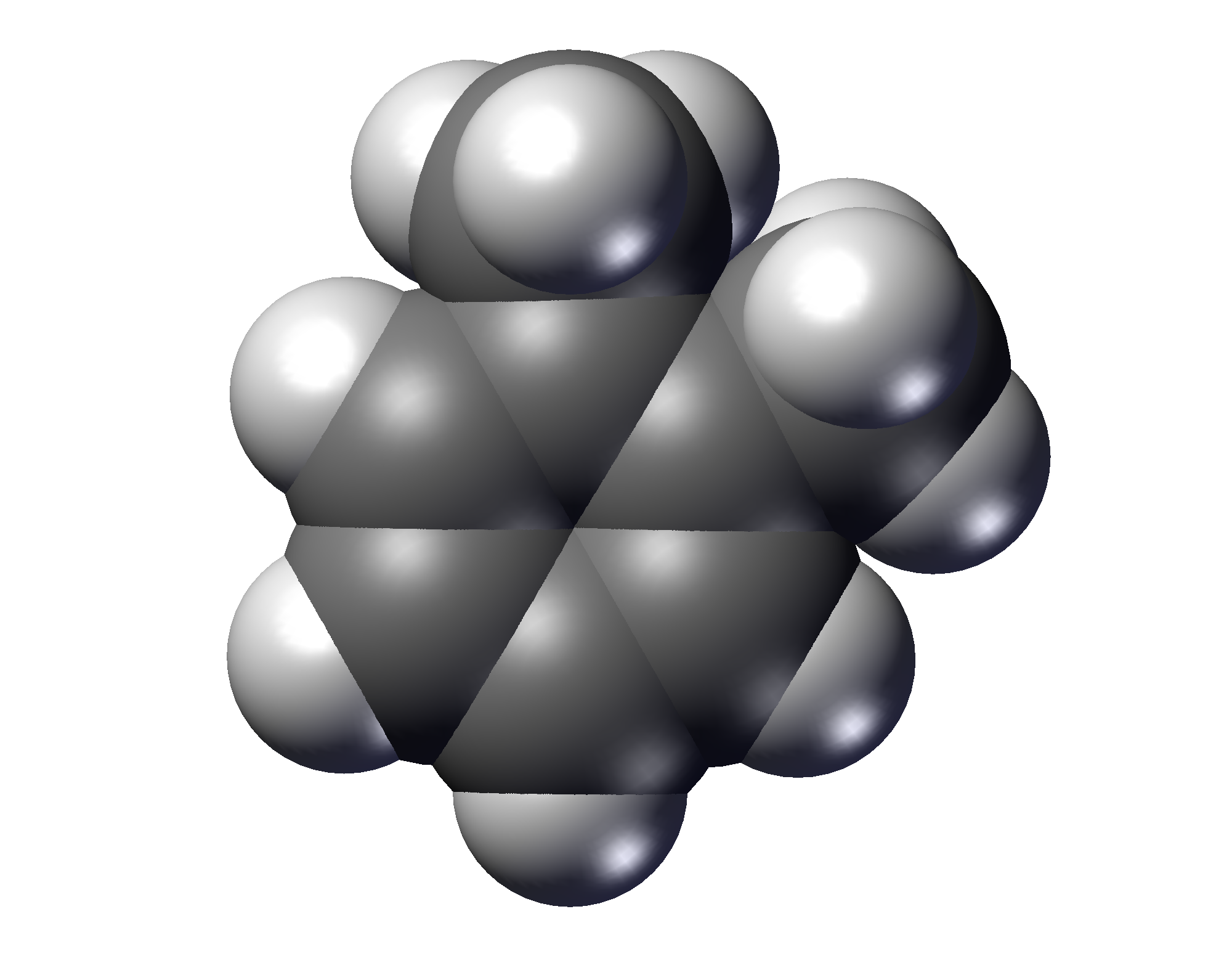
Space-filling model

Names
- Preferred IUPAC name 1,2-Xylene
- Systematic IUPAC name 1,2-Dimethylbenzene
- Other names o-Xylene, o-Xylol

Identifiers
CAS Number	95-47-6
3D model (JSmol)	Interactive image
Beilstein Reference	1815558
ChEBI	CHEBI:28063
ChEMBL	ChEMBL45005
ChemSpider	6967
DrugBank	DB03029
ECHA InfoCard	100.002.203
EC Number	202-422-2
Gmelin Reference	67796
KEGG	C07212
PubChem CID	7237
RTECS number	ZE2450000
UNII	Z2474E14QP
UN number	1307
CompTox Dashboard (EPA)	DTXSID3021807
- InChI: InChI=1S/C8H10/c1-7-5-3-4-6-8(7)2/h3-6H,1-2H3 Key: CTQNGGLPUBDAKN-UHFFFAOYSA-N; InChI=1/C8H10/c1-7-5-3-4-6-8(7)2/h3-6H,1-2H3 Key: CTQNGGLPUBDAKN-UHFFFAOYAE
- SMILES: CC1=C(C)C=CC=C1

Properties
Chemical formula	C_{8}H_{10}
Molar mass	106.168 g·mol^{−1}
Appearance	Colorless liquid
Density	0.88 g/ml
Melting point	−24 °C (−11 °F; 249 K)
Boiling point	144.4 °C (291.9 °F; 417.5 K)
Solubility in water	0.02% (20 °C)
Solubility in ethanol	very soluble
Solubility in diethyl ether	very soluble
Vapor pressure	7 mmHg (20°C)
Magnetic susceptibility (χ)	−77.78·10^{−6} cm^{3}/mol
Refractive index (n_{D})	1.50545
Viscosity	1.1049 cP at 0 °C; 0.8102 cP at 20 °C

Structure
Dipole moment	0.64 D

Hazards
- Occupational safety and health (OHS/OSH)
Main hazards	Mildly toxic
- GHS labelling
Pictograms	(GHS02: Flammable) (GHS07: Exclamation mark) (GHS08: Health hazard)
Signal word	Danger
Hazard statements	H225, H226, H304, H305, H312, H315, H319, H332, H335, H412
Precautionary statements	P210, P233, P240, P241, P242, P243, P261, P264, P271, P273, P280, P301+P310, P302+P352, P303+P361+P353, P304+P312, P304+P340, P305+P351+P338, P312, P321, P322, P331, P332+P313, P337+P313, P362, P363, P370+P378, P403+P233, P403+P235, P405, P501
NFPA 704 (fire diamond)	2 3 0
Flash point	32 °C (90 °F; 305 K)
Autoignition temperature	463 °C (865 °F; 736 K)
Explosive limits	0.9%-6.7%
Threshold limit value (TLV)	100 ppm (TWA), 150 ppm (STEL)
- Lethal dose or concentration (LD, LC)
LD_{50} (median dose)	4300 mg/kg (rats, orally)
LC_{Lo} (lowest published)	6125 ppm (rat, 12 hr); 6125 ppm (human, 12 hr)
- NIOSH (US health exposure limits)
PEL (Permissible)	TWA 100 ppm (435 mg/m^{3})
REL (Recommended)	TWA 100 ppm (435 mg/m^{3}) ST 150 ppm (655 mg/m^{3})
IDLH (Immediate danger)	900 ppm
Safety data sheet (SDS)	External MSDS

Related compounds
Related aromatic hydrocarbons	m-xylene p-xylene toluene

Supplementary data page
- O-Xylene (data page)
- Except where otherwise noted, data are given for materials in their standard state (at 25 °C [77 °F], 100 kPa). verify (what is ?) Infobox references

o-Xylene (ortho-xylene) is an aromatic hydrocarbon with the formula C_{6}H_{4}(CH_{3})_{2}, with two methyl substituents bonded to adjacent carbon atoms of a benzene ring (the ortho configuration). It is a constitutional isomer of m-xylene and p-xylene, the mixture being called xylene or xylenes. o-Xylene is a colourless slightly oily flammable liquid.

== Production and use ==
Petroleum contains about one weight percent xylenes. Most o-xylene is produced by cracking petroleum, which affords a distribution of aromatic compounds, including xylene isomers. m-Xylene is isomerized to o-xylene. Net production was approximately 500,000 tons in the year 2000.

o-Xylene is largely used in the production of phthalic anhydride, which is a precursor to many materials, drugs, and other chemicals. Related to their easy oxidation, the methyl groups are susceptible to halogenation. When treated with elemental bromine, these groups are brominated, yielding xylylene dibromide:

C_{6}H_{4}(CH_{3})_{2} + 2 Br_{2} → C_{6}H_{4}(CH_{2}Br)_{2} + 2 HBr

== Toxicity and exposure ==
Xylenes are not acutely toxic, for example the LD_{50} (rat, oral) is 4300 mg/kg. Effects vary with animal and xylene isomer. Concerns with xylenes focus on narcotic effects.
