= M-Xylene =

m-Xylene
Skeletal formula
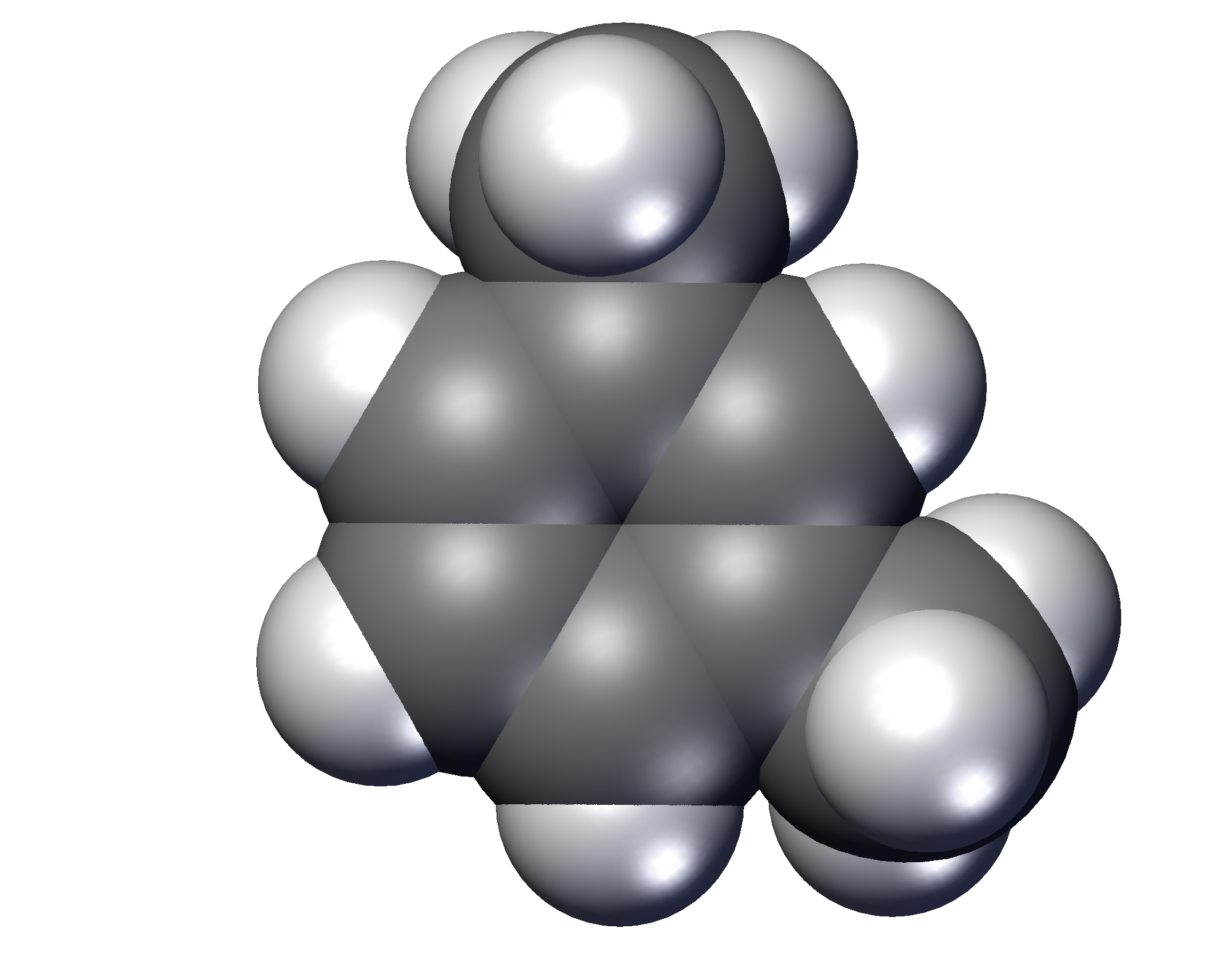
Space-filling model

Names
- Preferred IUPAC name 1,3-Xylene
- Systematic IUPAC name 1,3-Dimethylbenzene
- Other names m-Xylene, meta-Xylol

Identifiers
CAS Number	108-38-3
3D model (JSmol)	Interactive image
Beilstein Reference	605441
ChEBI	CHEBI:28488
ChEMBL	ChEMBL286727
ChemSpider	7641
ECHA InfoCard	100.003.252
EC Number	203-576-3
Gmelin Reference	101390
KEGG	C07208
PubChem CID	7929
RTECS number	ZE2275000
UNII	O9XS864HTE
UN number	1307
CompTox Dashboard (EPA)	DTXSID6026298
- InChI: InChI=1S/C8H10/c1-7-4-3-5-8(2)6-7/h3-6H,1-2H3 Key: IVSZLXZYQVIEFR-UHFFFAOYSA-N
- SMILES: Cc1cccc(c1)C; CC1=CC(C)=CC=C1

Properties
Chemical formula	C_{8}H_{10}
Molar mass	106.16 g/mol
Appearance	Colorless liquid
Odor	Aromatic in high concentrations
Density	0.86 g/mL
Melting point	−48 °C (−54 °F; 225 K)
Boiling point	139 °C (282 °F; 412 K)
Solubility in water	0.16 g/L (25 °C)
Solubility in ethanol	miscible
Solubility in diethyl ether	miscible
Vapor pressure	9 mmHg (20 °C)
Magnetic susceptibility (χ)	−76.56·10^{−6} cm^{3}/mol
Refractive index (n_{D})	1.49722
Viscosity	0.8059 cP at 0 °C; 0.6200 cP at 20 °C
Dipole moment	0.33–0.37 D

Hazards
- Occupational safety and health (OHS/OSH)
Main hazards	Harmful if swallowed. Vapor harmful. Flammable liquid and vapor.
- GHS labelling
Pictograms	(GHS02: Flammable) (GHS07: Exclamation mark) (GHS08: Health hazard)
Signal word	Danger
Hazard statements	H226, H302, H304, H312, H315, H318, H332
Precautionary statements	P210, P233, P240, P241, P242, P243, P261, P264, P271, P280, P301+P310, P302+P352, P303+P361+P353, P304+P312, P304+P340, P305+P351+P338, P310, P312, P321, P322, P331, P332+P313, P362, P363, P370+P378, P403+P235, P405, P501
NFPA 704 (fire diamond)	1 3 0
Flash point	27 °C (81 °F; 300 K)
Autoignition temperature	527 °C (981 °F; 800 K)
Explosive limits	1.1–7.0%
Threshold limit value (TLV)	100 ppm (TWA), 150 ppm (STEL)
- Lethal dose or concentration (LD, LC)
LC_{Lo} (lowest published)	2010 ppm (mouse, 24 hr); 8000 ppm (rat, 4 hr)
- NIOSH (US health exposure limits)
PEL (Permissible)	TWA 100 ppm (435 mg/m^{3})
REL (Recommended)	TWA 100 ppm (435 mg/m^{3}); ST 150 ppm (655 mg/m^{3})
IDLH (Immediate danger)	900 ppm
Safety data sheet (SDS)	External MSDS

Related compounds
Related aromatic hydrocarbons	benzene; toluene; o-xylene; p-xylene

Supplementary data page
- M-Xylene (data page)
- Except where otherwise noted, data are given for materials in their standard state (at 25 °C [77 °F], 100 kPa). verify (what is ?) Infobox references

m-Xylene (meta-xylene) is an aromatic hydrocarbon. It is one of the three isomers of dimethylbenzene known collectively as xylenes. The m- stands for meta-, indicating that the two methyl groups in m-xylene occupy positions 1 and 3 on a benzene ring. It is in the positions of the two methyl groups, their arene substitution pattern, that it differs from the other isomers, o-xylene and p-xylene. All have the same chemical formula C_{6}H_{4}(CH_{3})_{2}. All xylene isomers are colorless and highly flammable.

== Production and use ==
Petroleum contains about 1 weight percent xylenes. The meta isomer can be isolated from a mix of xylenes by the partial sulfonation (to which other isomers are less prone) followed by removal of unsulfonated oils and steam distillation of the sulfonated product.

The major use of meta-xylene is in the production of isophthalic acid, which is used as a copolymerizing monomer to alter the properties of polyethylene terephthalate. The conversion m-xylene to isophthalic acid entails catalytic oxidation. meta-Xylene is also used as a raw material in the manufacture of 2,4- and 2,6-xylidine as well as a range of smaller-volume chemicals. Ammoxidation gives isophthalonitrile.

== Toxicity and exposure ==
Xylenes are not acutely toxic, for example the LD_{50} (rat, oral) is 4300 mg/kg. Effects vary with animal and xylene isomer. Concerns with xylenes focus on narcotic effects.

== See also ==
- Tetrachloro-m-xylene
