= C12H18 =

The molecular formula C_{12}H_{18} (molar mass: 162.27 g/mol) may refer to:

- Cyclododecatriene
- Diisopropylbenzenes
  - 1,2-Diisopropylbenzene
  - 1,3-Diisopropylbenzene
  - 1,4-Diisopropylbenzene
- Hexamethylbenzene
- Iceane
- 2-Phenylhexane
- 1,3,5-Triethylbenzene
- 5-tert-Butyl-m-xylene
