= Friedel–Crafts reaction =

Set of reactions to attach substituents to an aromatic ring

Friedel-Crafts reaction
Named after	Charles Friedel; James Crafts
Reaction type	Coupling reaction

Reaction
Aromatic Ring
+
Alkyl Halide, Alcohol, Alkene or Alkyne
↓
Coupling Product

Conditions
Catalyst	Strong lewis acid: Zeolite, AlCl_{3}

Identifiers
RSC ontology ID	RXNO:0000369

The Friedel–Crafts reactions are a set of reactions developed by Charles Friedel and James Crafts in 1877 to attach substituents to an aromatic ring. Friedel–Crafts reactions are of two main types: alkylation reactions and acylation reactions. Both proceed by electrophilic aromatic substitution.

== Alkylation ==
Friedel-Crafts alkylation
Named after	Charles Friedel; James Crafts
Reaction type	Coupling reaction

Reaction
Aromatic Ring
+
Alkylating Agent
↓
Friedel-Crafts aromatic addition product
+
HCl (reaction type dependent)

Conditions
Catalyst	Strong lewis acid: Zeolite, AlCl_{3}

Identifiers
Organic Chemistry Portal	friedel-crafts-alkylation
RSC ontology ID	RXNO:0000046

=== With alkenes ===
In commercial applications, the alkylating agents are generally alkenes, some of the largest scale reactions practiced in industry. Such alkylations are of major industrial importance, e.g. for the production of ethylbenzene, the precursor to polystyrene, from benzene and ethylene and for the production of cumene from benzene and propene in cumene process:

Industrial production typically uses solid acids derived from a zeolite as the catalyst.

=== With alkyl halides ===
Friedel–Crafts alkylation involves the alkylation of an aromatic ring. Traditionally, the alkylating agents are alkyl halides. Many alkylating agents can be used instead of alkyl halides. For example, enones and epoxides can be used in presence of protons. The reaction typically employs a strong Lewis acid, such as aluminium chloride as catalyst, to increase the electrophilicity of the alkylating agent.

This reaction suffers from the disadvantage that the product is more nucleophilic than the reactant because alkyl groups are activators for the Friedel–Crafts reaction. Consequently, overalkylation can occur. However, steric hindrance can be exploited to limit the number of successive alkylation cycles that occur, as in the t-butylation of 1,4-dimethoxybenzene that gives only the product of two alkylation cycles and with only one of three possible isomers of it:

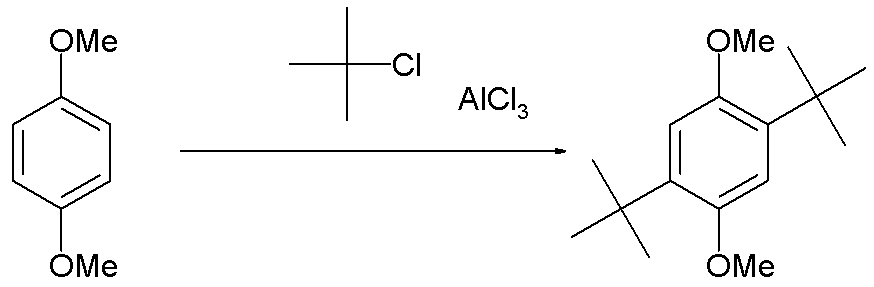

Furthermore, the reaction is only useful for primary alkyl halides in an intramolecular sense when a 5- or 6-membered ring is formed. For the intermolecular case, the reaction is limited to tertiary alkylating agents, some secondary alkylating agents (ones for which carbocation rearrangement is degenerate), or alkylating agents that yield stabilized carbocations (e.g., benzylic or allylic ones). In the case of primary alkyl halides, the carbocation-like complex (R^{(+)}---X---Al^{(-)}Cl_{3}) will undergo a carbocation rearrangement reaction to give almost exclusively the rearranged product derived from a secondary or tertiary carbocation.

Protonation of alkenes generates carbocations, the electrophiles. A laboratory-scale example by the synthesis of neophyl chloride from benzene and methallyl chloride using sulfuric acid catalyst.

==== Mechanism ====
The general mechanism for primary alkyl halides is shown in the figure below.

For the primary (and possibly secondary) alkyl halides shown, a carbocation-like complex with the Lewis acid, [R^{(+)}---(X---MX_{n})^{(–)}] is more likely to be involved, rather than a free carbocation.

=== Friedel–Crafts dealkylation ===
Friedel–Crafts alkylations can be reversible. Although this is usually undesirable it can be exploited; for instance by facilitating transalkylation reactions.

1,3-Diisopropylbenzene is produced via transalkylation, a special form of Friedel–Crafts alkylation.

It also allows alkyl chains to be added reversibly as protecting groups. This approach is used industrially in the synthesis of 4,4'-biphenol via the oxidative coupling and subsequent dealkylation of 2,6-di-tert-butylphenol.

== Acylation ==
Friedel-Crafts acylation
Named after	Charles Friedel; James Crafts
Reaction type	Coupling reaction

Reaction
Aromatic ring
+
Acylating agents
↓
Friedel-Crafts aromatic addition product
+
HCl (reaction type dependent)

Conditions
Catalyst	Strong lewis acid: Zeolite, AlCl_{3}

Identifiers
Organic Chemistry Portal	friedel-crafts-acylation
RSC ontology ID	RXNO:0000045

Friedel–Crafts acylation involves the acylation of aromatic rings. Typical acylating agents are acyl chlorides. Acid anhydrides as well as carboxylic acids are also viable. A typical Lewis acid catalyst is aluminium trichloride. Because, however, the product ketone forms a rather stable complex with Lewis acids such as AlCl_{3}, a stoichiometric amount or more of the "catalyst" must generally be employed, unlike the case of the Friedel–Crafts alkylation, in which the catalyst is constantly regenerated. Reaction conditions are similar to the Friedel–Crafts alkylation. This reaction has several advantages over the alkylation reaction. Due to the electron-withdrawing effect of the carbonyl group, the ketone product is always less reactive than the original molecule, so multiple acylations do not occur. Also, there are no carbocation rearrangements, as the acylium ion is stabilized by a resonance structure in which the positive charge is on the oxygen.

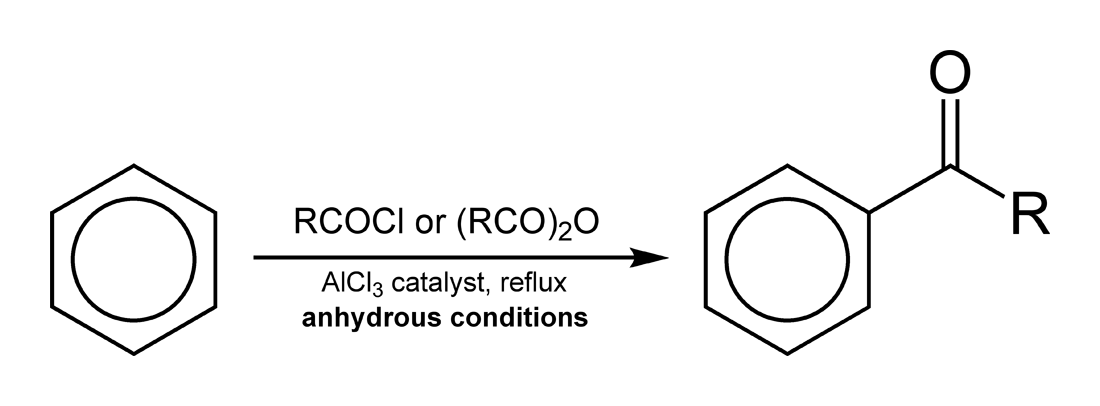

The viability of the Friedel–Crafts acylation depends on the stability of the acyl chloride reagent. Formyl chloride, for example, is too unstable to be isolated. Thus, synthesis of benzaldehyde through the Friedel–Crafts pathway requires that formyl chloride be synthesized in situ. This is accomplished by the Gattermann-Koch reaction, accomplished by treating benzene with carbon monoxide and hydrogen chloride under high pressure, catalyzed by a mixture of aluminium chloride and cuprous chloride. Simple ketones that could be obtained by Friedel–Crafts acylation are produced by alternative methods, e.g., oxidation, in industry.

=== Reaction mechanism ===
The reaction proceeds through generation of an acylium center. The reaction is completed by deprotonation of the arenium ion by AlCl_{4}^{−}, regenerating the AlCl_{3} catalyst. However, in contrast to the truly catalytic alkylation reaction, the formed ketone is a moderate Lewis base, which forms a complex with the strong Lewis acid aluminum trichloride. The formation of this complex is typically irreversible under reaction conditions. Thus, a stochiometric quantity of AlCl_{3} is needed. The complex is destroyed upon aqueous workup to give the desired ketone. For example, the classical synthesis of deoxybenzoin calls for 1.1 equivalents of AlCl_{3} with respect to the limiting reagent, phenylacetyl chloride. In certain cases, generally when the benzene ring is activated, Friedel–Crafts acylation can also be carried out with catalytic amounts of a milder Lewis acid (e.g. Zn(II) salts) or a Brønsted acid catalyst using the anhydride or even the carboxylic acid itself as the acylation agent.

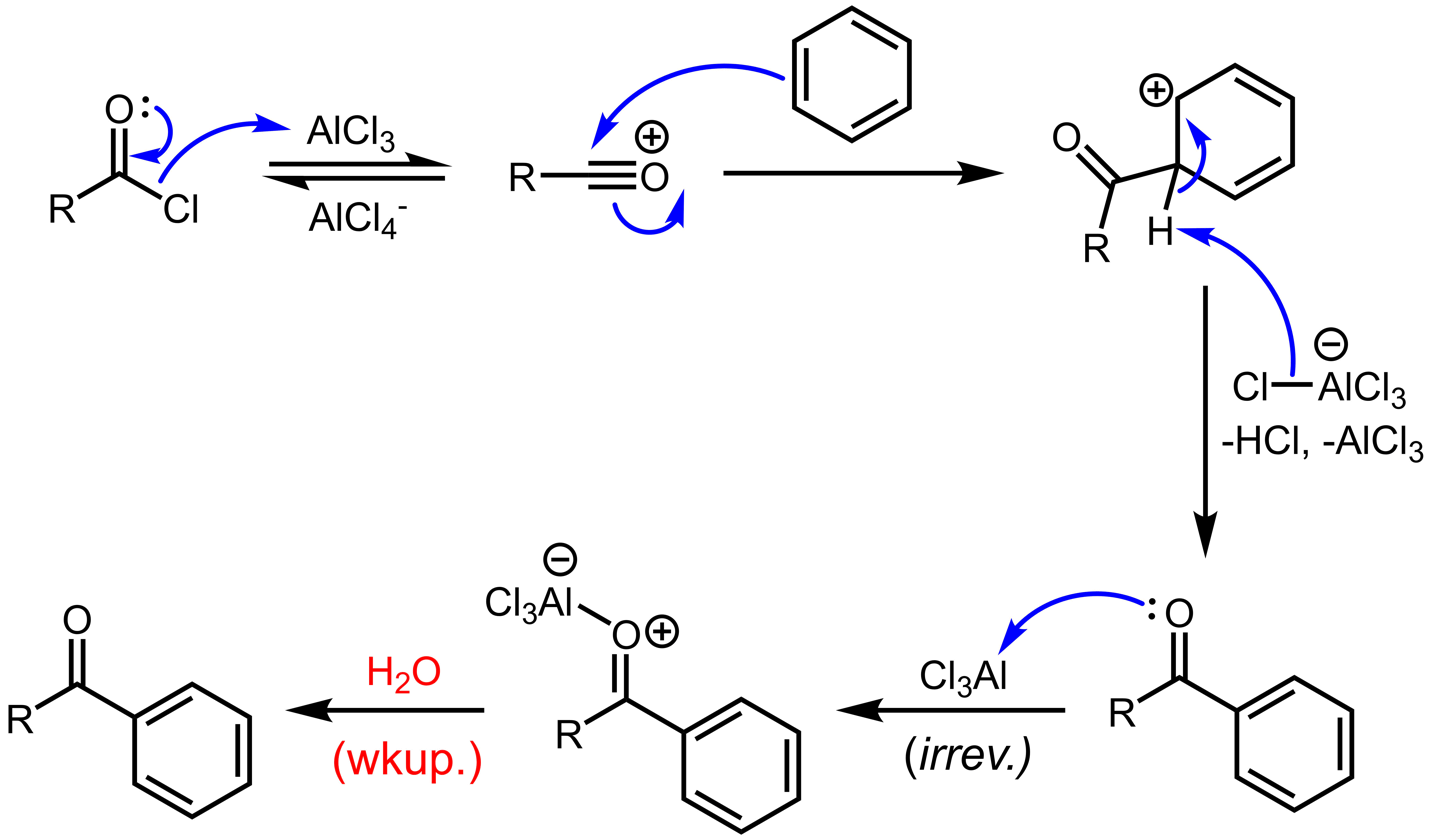

If desired, the resulting ketone can be subsequently reduced to the corresponding alkane substituent by either Wolff–Kishner reduction or Clemmensen reduction. The net result is the same as the Friedel–Crafts alkylation except that rearrangement is not possible.

== Hydroxyalkylation ==
Arenes react with certain aldehydes and ketones to form the hydroxyalkylated products, for example in the reaction of the mesityl derivative of glyoxal with benzene:

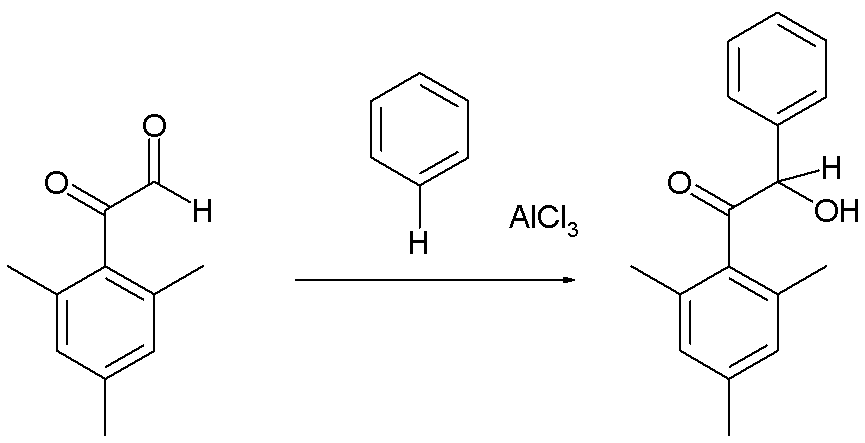

As usual, the aldehyde group is more reactive electrophile than the phenone.

== Scope and variations ==
Alkylation of benzene and ethylene, one of the largest scale reactions practiced commercially.

This reaction is related to several classic named reactions:

- The acylated reaction product can be converted into the alkylated product via a Clemmensen or a Wolff-Kishner reduction.
- The Pechmann condensation forms coumarins.
- The Gattermann–Koch reaction can be used to synthesize benzaldehyde from benzene.
- The Gatterman reaction describes arene reactions with hydrocyanic acid.
- The Houben–Hoesch reaction describes arene reactions with nitriles.
- A reaction modification with an aromatic phenyl ester as a reactant is called the Fries rearrangement.
- In the Scholl reaction two arenes couple directly (sometimes called Friedel–Crafts arylation).
- In the Blanc chloromethylation a chloromethyl group is added to an arene with formaldehyde, hydrochloric acid and zinc chloride. A related reaction is due to Joseph Tscherniac and Alfred Einhorn.
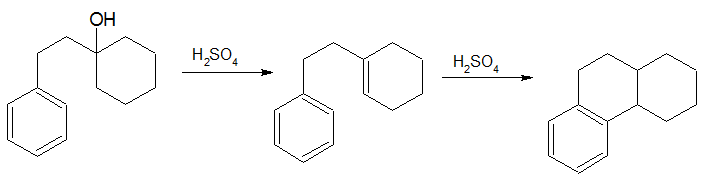
- The Bogert–Cook synthesis (1933) involves the dehydration and isomerization of 1-β-phenylethylcyclohexanol to the octahydro derivative of phenanthrene
- The Darzens–Nenitzescu synthesis of ketones (1910, 1936) involves the acylation of cyclohexene with acetyl chloride to methylcyclohexenylketone.
- In the related Nenitzescu reductive acylation (1936) a saturated hydrocarbon is added making it a reductive acylation to methylcyclohexylketone
- The Nencki reaction (1881) is the ring acetylation of phenols with acids in the presence of zinc chloride.
- In a green chemistry variation aluminium chloride is replaced by graphite in an alkylation of p-xylene with 2-bromobutane. This variation will not work with primary halides from which less carbocation involvement is inferred.

=== Dyes ===
Friedel–Crafts reactions have been used in the synthesis of several triarylmethane and xanthene dyes. Examples are the synthesis of thymolphthalein (a pH indicator) from two equivalents of thymol and phthalic anhydride:

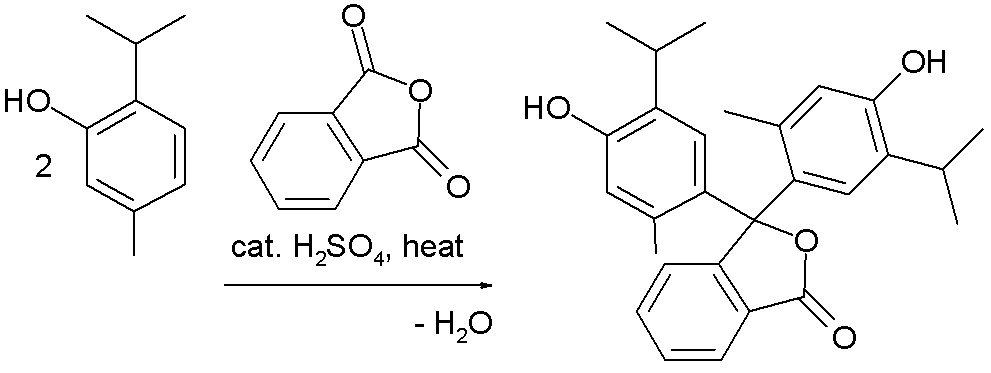

A reaction of phthalic anhydride with resorcinol in the presence of zinc chloride gives the fluorophore fluorescein. Replacing resorcinol by N,N-diethylaminophenol in this reaction gives rhodamine B:

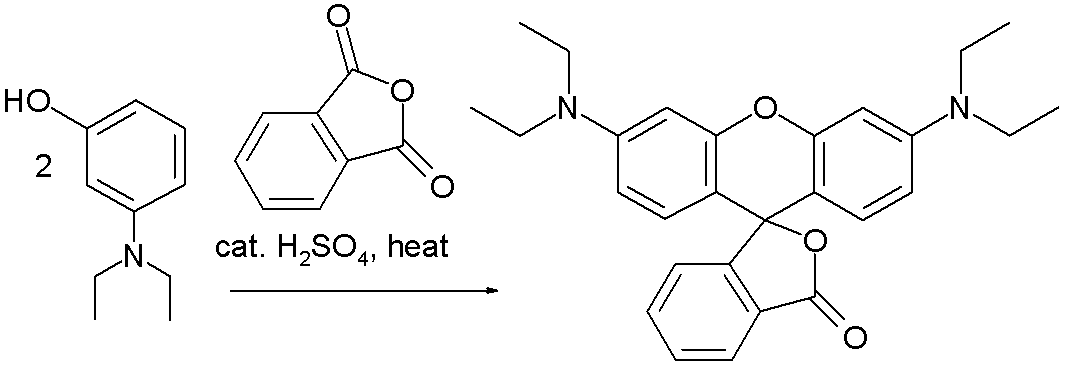

=== Haworth synthesis ===
The Haworth synthesis is a classic method for the synthesis of polycyclic aromatic hydrocarbons. In this reaction, an arene is reacted with succinic anhydride, the subsequent product is then reduced in either a Clemmensen reduction or a Wolff-Kishner reduction. Lastly, a second Friedel-Crafts acylation takes place with addition of acid.

The product formed in this reaction is then analogously reduced, followed by a dehydrogenation reaction (with the reagent SeO_{2} for example) to extend the aromatic ring system.

=== Friedel–Crafts test for aromatic hydrocarbons ===
Reaction of chloroform with aromatic compounds using an aluminium chloride catalyst gives triarylmethanes, which are often brightly colored, as is the case in triarylmethane dyes. This is a bench test for aromatic compounds.

== See also ==
- Friedel family, lineage of French scientists
- Hydrodealkylation
- Transalkylation
