= C11H14N2O =

The molecular formula C_{11}H_{14}N_{2}O (molar mass : 190.24 g/mol, exact mass : 190.110613) may refer to:

- Cytisine
- 4,4'-Dimethylaminorex
- 4-HO-AMT
- N-Hydroxy-AMT
- Indantadol
- Methoxytryptamine
  - 4-Methoxytryptamine
  - 5-Methoxytryptamine
  - 6-Methoxytryptamine
- Methylserotonin
  - 2-Methyl-5-hydroxytryptamine
  - α-Methylserotonin
  - N-Methylserotonin
- Norpsilocin
- 2-Phenyl-2-propanol
- 4-Hydroxygramine
