= Dicumyl peroxide =

Names
- Preferred IUPAC name 1,1′-[peroxydi(propane-2,2-diyl)]dibenzene
- Other names DCUP

Identifiers
CAS Number	80-43-3
3D model (JSmol)	Interactive image
ChEMBL	ChEMBL1519055
ChemSpider	6389
ECHA InfoCard	100.001.164
EC Number	201-279-3
PubChem CID	6641
RTECS number	SD8150000
UNII	M51X2J0U9D
UN number	3110
CompTox Dashboard (EPA)	DTXSID1025017
- InChI: InChI=1S/C18H22O2/c1-17(2,15-11-7-5-8-12-15)19-20-18(3,4)16-13-9-6-10-14-16/h5-14H,1-4H3 Key: XMNIXWIUMCBBBL-UHFFFAOYSA-N
- SMILES: CC(C)(C1=CC=CC=C1)OOC(C)(C)C2=CC=CC=C2

Properties
Chemical formula	C_{18}H_{22}O_{2}
Molar mass	270.372 g·mol^{−1}
Appearance	colorless solid
Density	1.062 g/cm^{3}
Melting point	39 °C (102 °F; 312 K)

Hazards
- GHS labelling
Pictograms	(GHS02: Flammable) (GHS07: Exclamation mark) (GHS08: Health hazard) (GHS09: Environmental hazard)
Signal word	Danger
Hazard statements	H242, H315, H319, H360, H411
Precautionary statements	P203, P210, P234, P240, P264, P264+P265, P273, P280, P302+P352, P305+P351+P338, P318, P321, P332+P317, P337+P317, P362+P364, P370+P378, P391, P403, P405, P410, P411, P420, P501
- Except where otherwise noted, data are given for materials in their standard state (at 25 °C [77 °F], 100 kPa). Infobox references

Dicumyl peroxide is an organic compound with the formula (C_{6}H_{5}CMe_{2}O)_{2} (Me = CH_{3}). Classified as a dialkyl peroxide, it is produced on a large scale industrially for use in polymer chemistry. It serves as an initiator and crosslinking agent in the production of low density polyethylene.

== Production ==
It is synthesized as a by-product in the autoxidation of cumene, which mainly affords cumene hydroperoxide. Alternatively, it can be produced by the addition of hydrogen peroxide to α-methylstyrene.

Of the approximately 60,000 ton/y production of dialkyl peroxides, dicumyl peroxide is dominant.

== Properties ==
Dicumyl peroxide is relatively stable compound owing to the steric protection provided by the several substituents adjacent to the peroxide group. Upon heating, it breaks down by homolysis of the relatively weak O-O bond.
