= Α-Methylstyrene =

α-Methylstyrene
Skeletal formula
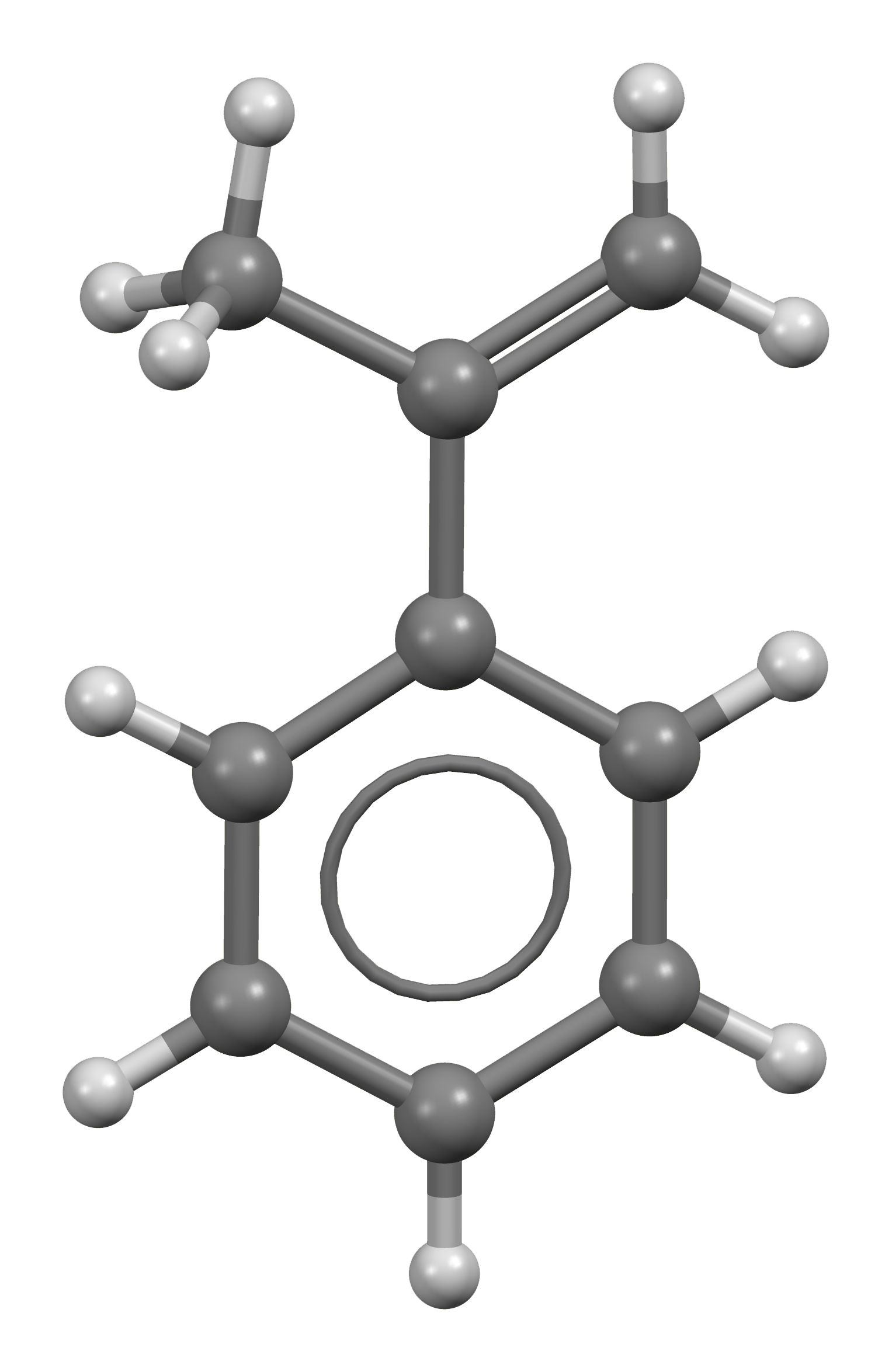
Ball-and-stick model

Names
- Preferred IUPAC name (Prop-1-en-2-yl)benzene
- Other names 2-Phenylpropene; 2-Phenylpropylene; 1-Methyl-1-phenylethylene; 1-Methyl-1-phenylethene; 1-Phenyl-1-methylethylene; 1-Phenyl-1-methylethene; (1-Methylethenyl)benzene; β-Phenylpropene; β-Phenylpropylene; α-Methylstyrol; α-Methylvinylbenzene; Isopropenylbenzene

Identifiers
CAS Number	98-83-9
3D model (JSmol)	Interactive image; Interactive image
Abbreviations	AMS
ChEBI	CHEBI:35060
ChEMBL	ChEMBL1344773
ChemSpider	7129
ECHA InfoCard	100.002.459
EC Number	202-705-0
KEGG	C14395
PubChem CID	7407
RTECS number	WL5075300
UNII	D46R9753IK
UN number	2303
CompTox Dashboard (EPA)	DTXSID9025661
- InChI: InChI=1S/C9H10/c1-8(2)9-6-4-3-5-7-9/h3-7H,1H2,2H3 Key: XYLMUPLGERFSHI-UHFFFAOYSA-N; InChI=1/C9H10/c1-8(2)9-6-4-3-5-7-9/h3-7H,1H2,2H3 Key: XYLMUPLGERFSHI-UHFFFAOYAS
- SMILES: C=C(c1ccccc1)C; CC(=C)c1ccccc1

Properties
Chemical formula	C_{9}H_{10}
Molar mass	118.179 g·mol^{−1}
Appearance	Colorless liquid
Density	0.91 g/cm^{3}
Melting point	−24 °C (−11 °F; 249 K)
Boiling point	165 to 169 °C (329 to 336 °F; 438 to 442 K)
Solubility in water	Insoluble
Vapor pressure	2 mmHg (20 °C)
Magnetic susceptibility (χ)	−80.1·10^{−6} cm^{3}/mol

Hazards
- GHS labelling
Pictograms	(GHS02: Flammable) (GHS07: Exclamation mark) (GHS09: Environmental hazard)
Signal word	Warning
Hazard statements	H226, H319, H335, H411
Precautionary statements	P210, P233, P240, P241, P242, P243, P261, P264+P265, P271, P273, P280, P303+P361+P353, P304+P340, P305+P351+P338, P319, P337+P317, P370+P378, P391, P403+P233, P403+P235, P405, P501
NFPA 704 (fire diamond)	3 0 0
Flash point	45 °C (113 °F; 318 K)
Explosive limits	1.9–6.1%
- Lethal dose or concentration (LD, LC)
LD_{50} (median dose)	4900 mg/kg (oral, rat)
- NIOSH (US health exposure limits)
PEL (Permissible)	C 100 ppm (480 mg/m^{3})
REL (Recommended)	TWA 50 ppm (240 mg/m^{3}) ST 100 ppm (485 mg/m^{3})
IDLH (Immediate danger)	700 ppm
- Except where otherwise noted, data are given for materials in their standard state (at 25 °C [77 °F], 100 kPa). verify (what is ?) Infobox references

α-Methylstyrene (AMS) is an organic compound with the formula C_{6}H_{5}C(CH_{3})=CH_{2}. It is a colorless oil.

== Synthesis and reactions ==
AMS is formed as a by-product of the cumene process. In this procedure, cumene is converted to its radical, through a reaction with oxygen.

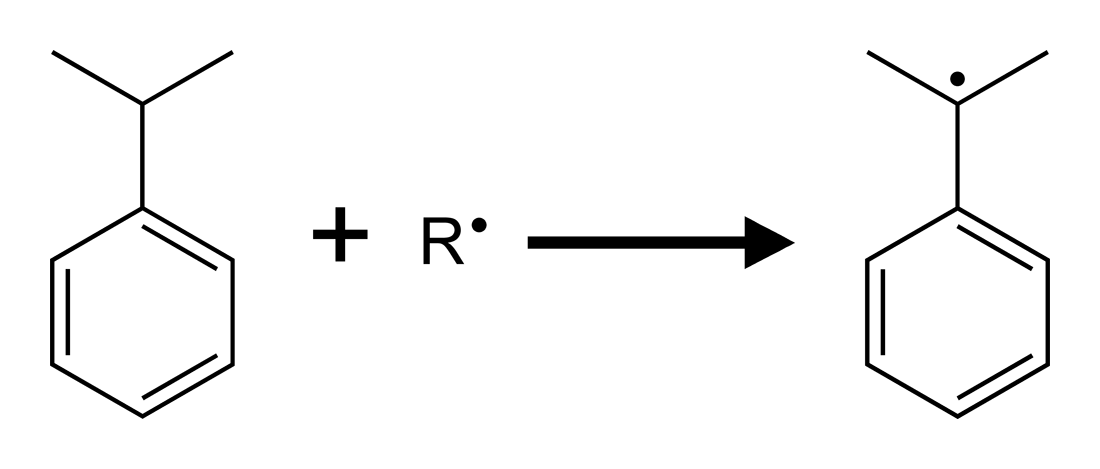

Normally these cumene radicals are converted to cumene hydroperoxide, however they can also undergo radical disproportionation to form AMS.

Although this is only a minor side reaction, the cumene process is run at such a large scale that the recovery of AMS is commercially viable and satisfies much of the global demand. AMS can also be produced by dehydrogenation of cumene.

The homopolymer obtained from this monomer, poly(α-methylstyrene), is unstable, being characterized by a low ceiling temperature of 65°C.

== Side effects in humans ==
The American Conference of Governmental Industrial Hygienists (2009) defined occupational exposure limits of 10 ppm for airborne concentrations of α-methylstyrene based on allergic reactions and effects on the central nervous system.
