= John La Gatta =

American painter (1894–1977)

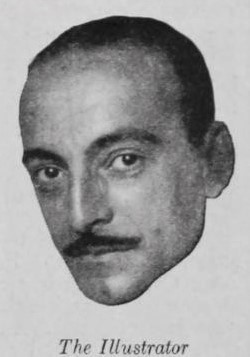
John La Gatta (1924)

John La Gatta (May 26, 1894 – January 21, 1977), also spelled LaGatta, was an American advertising illustrator active during the first half of the 20th century.

== Early life ==
John La Gatta was born in Naples, Italy, the son of an educated father and a mother from an old and well-connected family which traced their origins back to the Count of Anjou, brother of King Louis IX of France. La Gatta was a sickly child. Around the age of four his mother died in childbirth. The family emigrated to the United States.

He showed an early talent for art. In the fall of 1909, at the age of 15, he enrolled in the New York School of Fine and Applied Arts (now Parsons School of Design) where he excelled at charcoal draftsman and the portrayal of form and motion. He studied under artists Kenneth Hayes Miller and Frank Alvah Parsons. He was selling sketches to Life magazine to pay for his formal education and after graduation he continued working for Life and doing advertising illustrations for N. W. Ayer advertising agency. He often showed everyday working life.

== Early career ==
In 1914, he moved to Philadelphia to design film posters for Lubian Film Company. In 1916, he moved to work for art studio owner Nelson Amsden. In Cleveland, he met and in 1918 married Amsden's cousin, Florence Eugenia Olds, an art student at the Cleveland School of Art. They had two children, son John Hawley Olds La Gatta, and daughter Jeanne Mehit (ne LaGatta).

An assignment from N. W. Ayer advertising agency of Philadelphia brought La Gatta back to New York City in 1918. He did illustrations for Society Brand men's work clothes, Blue Buckle overalls, and General Motors. After six months he resigned from N. W. Ayer and spent six months creating a portfolio of paintings using his wife as the model. These led to new commissions.

== Later career ==
His advertising clients included Resinol soap, International Silver Company, Ajax Rubber Company, Laros Lingerie, Hoover vacuum cleaners, Paramount Pictures, Campbell's Soup, Ivory Soap, Kellogg's, Johnson & Johnson, Spaulding Swimwear, and Chase and Sanborn Coffee.

He did work for many of America's most prominent magazines including Ladies' Home Journal, Cosmopolitan, Woman's Home Companion, Redbook, McCall's, and Harper's Bazaar. He eventually painted twenty-two Saturday Evening Post covers. According to a post on The Saturday Evening Post website, "His art was a window into a world of cool elegance most readers would not otherwise be aware of."

Fellow illustrator Frederick R. Gruger, upon seeing La Gatta's images of women, said he painted "chrome-plated women."

He joined the Guild of Freelance Artists. Its membership also included Norman Rockwell, Charles Dana Gibson and Neysa McMein. He was a member of the Society of Illustrators from 1922 to 1939. And was the interim president in 1927.

== Lavish lifestyle ==
During the 1930s, when the average income was $2,000 to $4,000 a year, La Gatta earned over $100,000 a year. Though the Depression he earned more than the President of the United States.

His images appeared in advertising into the 1940s and made him a sought-after illustrator.

In addition to a studio in Manhattan, he bought a house in Sands Point, New York, on the north shore of Long Island, and a home in Woodstock, New York. He owned a custom-made Packard Phaeton and a forty-five-foot yacht.

When the stock market crashed, LaGatta's assets were protected since he invested almost exclusively in real estate.

In 1937 John La Gatta appeared in the Jack Benny movie Artists & Models along with fellow illustrators McClelland Barclay and Arthur William Brown, and cartoonists Peter Arno and Rube Goldberg.

== Illustration technique ==
At the peak of his career in the 1930s, La Gatta could produce an illustration a day. W. Thornton "Pete" Martin, editor of The Saturday Evening Post, once commented, "I don't see how it is humanly possible for you to deliver six pictures at once and still keep the quality of your work at its stratospheric La Gatta high, but it is a neat trick if you can do it."

He worked almost exclusively on illustration board, drawing with charcoal. He then sprayed the drawing with fixative and over-painted with thin oil paint which allowed the charcoal lines to show through. He often finished a painting by adding color using a palette knife to build texture.

He was a frequent judge of the Miss America pageant and found models there, as well as from model agencies, the theater, and women he met. He favored brunette; but was known for using a brunette, a blond, and a redhead in the same illustration. Once he found a model who met his standards of beauty, he often painted her for years.

== Move to California ==
By the 1940s, La Gatta's illustrations were no longer in demand as National magazines and advertisers began to use more photography. He rented out the Sands Point house and moved to Woodstock, New York.

He created a daily comic strip, Sally Forth, with California screenwriter Borden Chase. La Gatta moved his family to California in 1941. The strip was syndicated but La Gatta found it too time-consuming and dropped the project.

In California he continued his advertising commissions. He created illustrations for Woodbury Soap and Laros Silk Lingerie. However, the income was not enough and La Gatta sold his yacht and turned to portrait painting. He was plagued with health problems (he eventually has 17 stomach surgeries) and struggled financially.

In 1956 Edward A. "Tink" Adams, the founder of what is now the Art Center College of Design in Pasadena, California, hired La Gatta as an instructor. La Gatta was a demanding but popular taskmaster and many of his pupils went on to careers in illustration; including Bob Peak, Bart Forbes, Mark English, Charles McVicker, and Don Shaeffer the head of the famous Charles E. Cooper Studio.

== Death and legacy ==
The college had a mandatory retirement age of 75. John La Gatta taught his last art class in 1968, and was awarded an Honorary Degree of Doctor of Fine Arts. He continued to paint for shows and galleries. He died on January 21, 1977, in Santa Monica, California. His wife Florence died in 1992.

In 1984 the Society of Illustrators posthumously inducted John La Gatta into its Illustrators Hall of Fame and in 2011 honored him as a Distinguished Educator in the Arts.

La Gatta's son, John Hawley Olds La Gatta, graduated from the University of California, Berkeley and moved to New York City to start a financial career. In 1970 he founded Olds Securities Corporation (Olds was his mother's maiden name). He moved to San Francisco, California, in 1990, then to Reno, Nevada, in 1996; where he founded the non-profit Catamount Fund the following year. John H.O. La Gatta died in Reno in 2015.
