= Cumenol =

Cumenol may refer to:

- Cumyl alcohol
- 2-phenyl-2-propanol
