= Neophyl =

Neophyl can mean:

- neophyl group, trivial name of 2-methyl-2-phenylpropyl functional group, PhC(CH_{3})_{2}CH_{2}- (e.g. in neophyl chloride)
- one of trade names of diprophylline
