= Transalkylation =

Chemical reaction which transfers an alkyl group between molecules

In organic chemistry, transalkylation is a chemical reaction involving the transfer of an alkyl group from one organic compound to another. The reaction is used for the transfer of methyl and ethyl groups between benzene rings. This is of particular value in the petrochemical industry to manufacture p-xylene, styrene, and other aromatic compounds. Motivation for using transalkylation reactions is based on a difference in production and demand for benzene, toluene, and xylenes. Transalkylation can convert toluene, which is overproduced, into benzene and xylene, which are under-produced. Zeolites are often used as catalysts in transalkylation reactions.

== Disproportionation ==
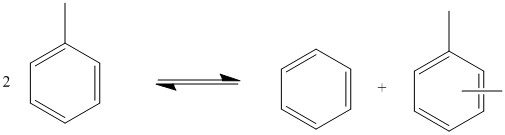
Reaction of toluene to produce benzene and xylene

Transalkylation, as used by the petrochemical industry, is often used to convert toluene into benzene and xylenes. This is achieved through a disproportionation reaction of toluene in which one toluene molecule transfers its methyl group to another one. The reaction is not selective, and the xylene produced can be ortho, meta, or para. There is a higher demand for para xylene, so it is often separated, and the mixture is allowed to reequilibrate to give more para product.

=== Diethylbenzenes ===
Diethylbenzenes arise as side-products of the alkylation of benzene with ethylene, which is conducted on a very large scale. Since there is only a limited market for diethylbenzene, much of it is recycled by transalkylation to give ethylbenzene:

$$\ce{C6H4(C2H5)2 + C6H6 -> 2 C6H5C2H5}$$

== M/R Ratio ==
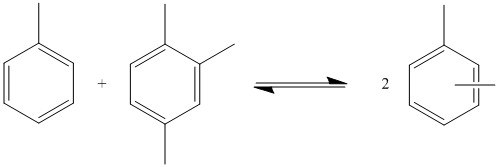
Transalkylation of toluene and trimethylbenzene to produce xylene. In this example, the M/R ratio is 2.

This type of reaction can also be performed with toluene and trimethylbenzene to produce xylene. The reaction occurs via equilibrium, so the product is not pure xylene. Many products are produced with varying numbers of methyl groups. The quantities in which each product is produced depends on the M/R ratio. This is the ratio of the number of methyl groups to the number of benzene rings in all of the substrates. For example, in the disproportionation of toluene, the M/R ratio is 1. Side reactions in which alkanes are produced reduce the number of methyl groups available which decreases the M/R ratio. This can be mitigated by adding compounds with higher numbers of methyl groups, such as trimethylbenzene. The ratio of products produced depends only on the M/R ratio so different starting materials can produce the same compounds via transalkylation.

== Zeolite catalysts ==
Transalkylation reactions of six to ten carbon methylated aromatics are often performed with the cofeed of hydrogen gas, over a zeolite based solid catalyst. Industrial processes operate the transalkylation reactor at elevated temperature and pressure to achieve desired process economics. Zeolites are micro-crystalline solids composed of tetrahedral AlO_{4} and SiO_{4} building blocks. These crystals are porous in nature with characteristic micropore channels, cavities. Zeolite is known as one class of molecular sieve because of their channel openings are often between 0.4 and 1.5 nanometers, just enough for the molecules to pass through. Aromatics molecules enter and exit these channels at different rates, also called diffusion. In addition to their molecular sieving effect, zeolites have weakly bonded protons originated from its chemical composition. These are chemical active centers for acid-catalyzed transalkylation reaction.

Zeolites of varying sizes are used to perform transalkylation on different substrates. For example, zeolites with a pore size of 5.5Å are suitable for benzene, toluene, xylenes and trimethylbenzenes transalkylations.

== Phenols ==
Transalkylation is employed in the commercial production of aromatics beyond the usual BTX feedstocks. For example, 4-tert-butylphenol is produced in part via two transalkylation reactions. In one example, tert-butylphenyl ether is isomerized to the phenol:

$$\ce{(CH3)3COC6H5  -> HOC6H4C(CH3)3}$$

Additionally, 2,4-di-tert-butylphenol is converted to 4-tert-butylphenol by treatment with phenol by transalkylation:

$$\ce{HOC6H3(C(CH3)3)2 + HOC6H5  ->  2 HOC6H4C(CH3)3}$$

Transalkylation in conjunction with the Hock rearrangement contributes to the production of 1,3-diisopropylbenzene, a precursor to resorcinol.

1,3-Diisopropylbenzene is produced via transalkylation.

== See also ==
- Alkylation
- BTX (chemistry)
- Friedel–Crafts reaction
- Hydrodealkylation
- Transesterification
