= Inverse vulcanization =

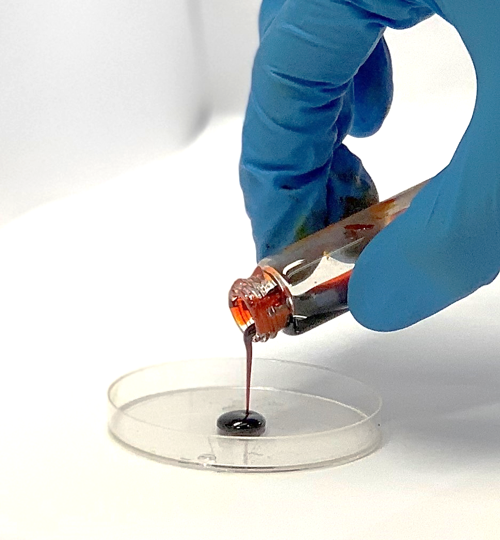
Preparation of poly(sulfur-co-1,3-di isopropyl benzene)

Inverse vulcanization is a process that produces polysulfide polymers, which also contain some organic linkers. In contrast, sulfur vulcanization produces material that is predominantly organic but has a small percentage of polysulfide crosslinks.

== Synthesis ==
Like Thiokols and sulfur-vulcanization, inverse vulcanization uses the tendency of sulfur catenate. The polymers produced by inverse vulcanization consist of long sulfur linear chains interspersed with organic linkers. Traditional sulfur vulcanization produces a cross-linked material with short sulfur bridges, down to one or two sulfur atoms.

The polymerization process begins with the heating of elemental sulfur above its melting point (115.21 °C), to favor the ring-opening polymerization process (ROP) of the S_{8} monomer, occurring at 159 °C. As a result, the liquid sulfur is constituted by linear polysulfide chains with diradical ends, which can be easily bridged together with small dienes, such as 1,3-Diisopropylbenzene(DIB), 1,4-diphenylbutadiyne, limonene, divinylbenzene (DVB), dicyclopentadiene, styrene, 4-vinylpyridine, cycloalkene and ethylidene norbornene, or longer organic molecules as polybenzoxazines, squalene and triglyceride. Chemically, the diene carbon-carbon double bond (C=C) of the substitutional group disappears, forming the carbon-sulfur single bond (C-S) which binds together the sulfur linear chains. The advantage of such a polymerization is the absence of a solvent; Sulphur acts as comonomer and solvent. This makes the process highly scalable at the industrial level, and kilogram-scale synthesis of the poly(S-r-DIB) has already been accomplished.

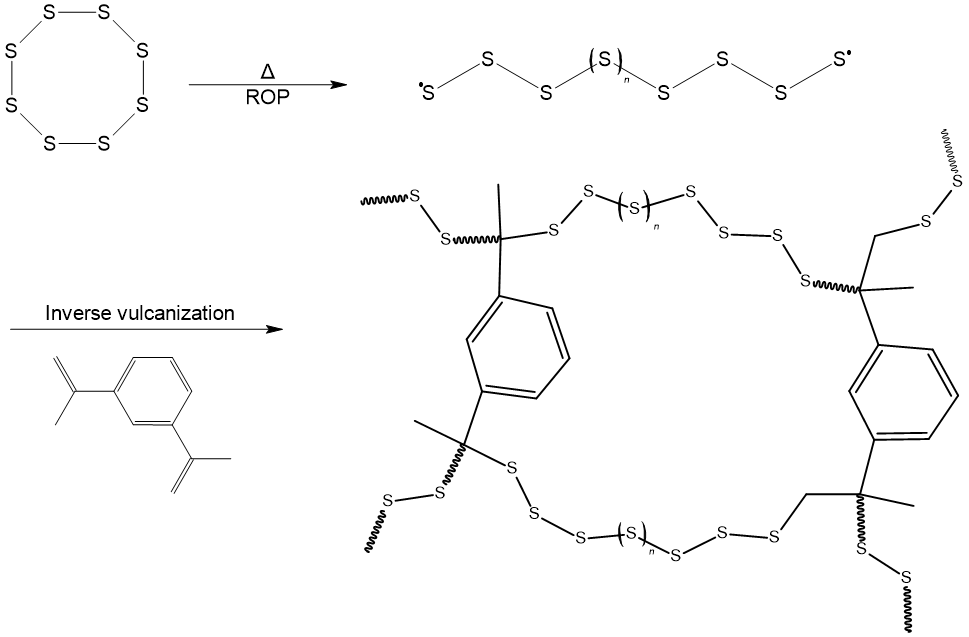
Inverse vulcanization process of sulfur through 1,3-diisopropenylbenzene.

== Products, characterization and properties ==
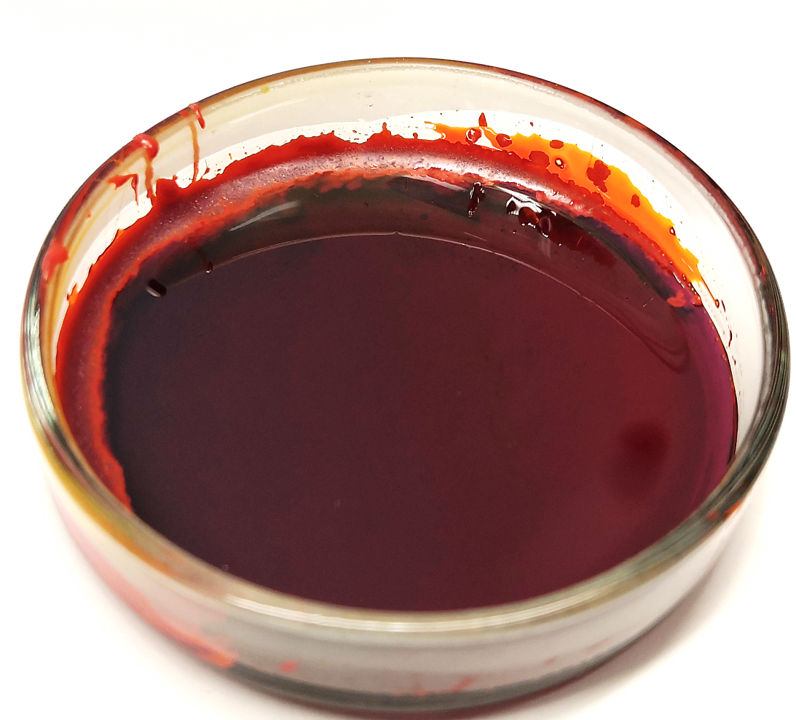
Physical appearance of poly(sulfur-random-1,3-diisopropenylbenzene

Vibrational spectroscopy was performed to investigate the chemical structure of the copolymers, and the presence of the C-S bonds was detected through Infrared or Raman spectroscopies. The high amount of S-S bonds makes the copolymer highly IR-inactive in the near and mid-infrared spectrum. As a consequence, sulfur-rich materials made via inverse vulcanization are characterized by a high refractive index (n~1.8), whose value depends again upon the composition and crosslinking species. As shown by thermogravimetric analysis (TGA), the copolymer thermal stability increases with the amount of added crosslinker; however, all the tested compositions degrade above 222 °C.

Copolymer behavior included that, the glass-transition temperature depends upon the composition and crosslinking species. For given comonomers, the behavior of the copolymers as a function of the temperature depends on the chemical composition; for example, the poly (sulfur-random-divinylbenzene) behaves as a plastomer for a diene content between 15 and 25%wt, and as a viscous resin with the 30–35%wt of DVB. On the other hand, the poly (sulfur-random-1,3-diisopropenylbenzene) acts as thermoplastic at 15–25%wt of DIB, while it becomes a thermoplastic-thermosetting polymer for a diene concentration of 30-35%wt. The potential to break and reform the chemical bonds along the polysulfide chains (S-S) allows the repair of the copolymer by simply heating above 100 °C. This increases the ability to reform and recycle the high molecular weight copolymer.

== Potential applications ==
The sulfur-rich copolymers made via inverse vulcanization could in principle find diverse applications due to their simple synthesis process and thermoplasticity.

=== Lithium-sulfur batteries ===
This new way of sulfur processing has been exploited for the cathode preparation of long-cycling lithium-sulfur batteries. Such electrochemical systems are characterized by a greater energy density than commercial Li-ion batteries, but they are not stable for long service life. Simmonds et al. first demonstrated improved capacity retention for over 500 cycles with an inverse vulcanization copolymer, suppressing the typical capacity fading of sulfur-polymer composites. The poly (sulfur-random-1,3-diisopropenylbenzene), briefly defined as poly (S-r-DIB), showed a higher composition homogeneity compared with other cathodic materials, together with greater sulfur retention and an enhanced adjustment of the polysulfides' volume variations. These advantages made it possible to assemble a stable and durable Li-S cell. Subsequently, other copolymers were synthesized via inverse vulcanization and tested inside these electrochemical devices, again providing high stability over their cycles.

Battery performances
Cathode	Date	Source	Specific Capacity after cycling
Poly (sulfur-random-1,3-diisopropylbenzene)	2014	University of Arizona	800 mA⋅h/g after 300 cycles (at 0.1 C)
Poly (sulfur-random-1,4-Diphenyl-1,3-butadiene)	2015	University of Arizona	800 mA⋅h/g after 300 cycles (at 0.2 C)
Poly (sulfur-random-divinylbenzene)	2016	University of the Basque Country	700 mA⋅h/g after 500 cycles (at 0.25 C)
Poly (sulfur-random-diallyl disulfide)	2016	University of the Basque Country	616 mA⋅h/g after 200cycles (at 0.2 C)
Poly (sulfur-random-bismaleimide-divinylbenzene)	2016	Istanbul Technical University	400 mA⋅h/g after 50 cycles (at 0.1 C)
Poly (sulfur-random-styrene)	2017	University of Arizona	485 mA⋅h/g after 1000 cycles (at 0.2 C)

In order to overcome the disadvantages related to the materials' low electrical conductivity (10^{15}–10^{16} Ω·cm), researchers have started to add special carbon-based particles to increase electron transport inside the copolymer. Furthermore, such carbonaceous additives improve the polysulfides' retention at the cathode through the polysulfides-capturing effect, increasing the battery performances. Examples of employed nanostructures are long carbon nanotubes, graphene, and carbon onions.

=== Capturing Mercury ===
The new materials could be used to remove toxic metals from soil or water. Pure sulfur cannot be employed to manufacture a functional filter because of its low mechanical properties; therefore, inverse vulcanization was investigated to produce porous materials, in particular for the mercury capturing process. The liquid metal binds together with the sulfur-rich copolymer, remaining mostly inside the filter.

=== Infrared transmission ===
Sulfur-rich copolymers, made via inverse vulcanization, have advantages over traditional IR optical materials due to the simple manufacturing process, low cost reagents, and high refractive index. As mentioned before, the latter depends upon the S-S bonds concentration, leading to the ability to tune the optical properties of the material by modifying the chemical formulation. The ability to change the material's refractive index to fulfill the specific application requirements makes these copolymers applicable in military, civil or medical fields.

=== Others ===
The inverse vulcanization process can also be employed for the synthesis of activated carbon with narrow pore-size distributions. The sulfur-rich copolymer acts as a template where the carbons are produced. The final material is doped with sulfur and exhibits a micro-porous network and high gas selectivity. Therefore, inverse vulcanization could also be used for gas separation applications.

== See also ==
- Sulfur
- Free-radical polymerization
- Lithium-sulfur batteries
