= Diisopropylbenzene =

Hydrocarbon compound; benzene ring with two isopropyl groups

The diisopropylbenzenes (DIPB) are organic compounds with the formula C_{6}H_{4}(CH(CH_{3})_{2})_{2}. Three isomers exist: 1,2- 1,3-, and 1,4-diisopropylbenzene. All are colorless liquids, immiscible in water, with similar boiling points. They are classified are aromatic hydrocarbons bearing a pair of isopropyl (CH(CH_{3})_{2}) substituents. DIPB has been referred to as "a common diluent" alongside hexane.

Diisopropylbenzenes
Systematic name	1,2-Diisopropylbenzene	1,3-Diisopropylbenzene	1,4-Diisopropylbenzene
Common name	o-Diisopropylbenzene	m-Diisopropylbenzene	p-Diisopropylbenzene
Chemical structure	Structure of 1,2-diisopropylbenzene	Structure of 1,3-diisopropylbenzene	Structure of 1,4-diisopropylbenzene
CAS Number	577-55-9	99-62-7	100-18-5
PubChem	CID 11345 from PubChem	CID 7450 from PubChem	CID 7486 from PubChem
Chemical formula	C_{12}H_{18}		
Molar mass	162.28 g/mol		
State of matter	Liquid		
Melting point	−57 °C	−63 °C	−17 °C
Boiling point	205 °C	203 °C	210 °C
Solubility	Very slightly soluble in water	0.072 mg·l^{−1} in water (25 °C)	Practically insoluble in water

== Production and reactions ==
Diisopropylbenzenes typically arise by alkylation of benzene or isopropylbenzene with propylene:

C_{6}H_{6} + CH_{3}CH=CH_{2} → C_{6}H_{5}CH(CH_{3})_{2}
C_{6}H_{5}CH(CH_{3})_{2} + CH_{3}CH=CH_{2} → C_{6}H_{4}(CH(CH_{3})_{2})_{2}

These alkylations are catalyzed by various Lewis acids, such as aluminium trichloride.

They can also be prepared and transformed by transalkylation reactions. In this way, triisopropylbenzenes are converted back to diisopropylbenzenes upon treatment with benzene or monoisopropylbenzene. As usual, these transformations are catalyzed by Lewis acids.

C_{6}H_{4}(CH(CH_{3})_{2})_{2} + C_{6}H_{6} → 2 C_{6}H_{5}CH(CH_{3})_{2}

The 1,3- and 1,4- isomers are mainly of interest as precursors to the respective dihydroxylbenzene derivatives, which exploits the Hock rearrangements. All three isomers form hydroperoxides, as is implicit in the Hock rearrangement, which are of interest as radical initiators for polymerization.
