= Cumene hydroperoxide =

Aromatic organic chemical compound

Names
- Preferred IUPAC name 2-Phenylpropane-2-peroxol
- Other names Cumyl hydroperoxide CHP

Identifiers
CAS Number	80-15-9
3D model (JSmol)	Interactive image
ChEBI	CHEBI:78673
ChemSpider	6377
ECHA InfoCard	100.001.141
PubChem CID	6629
UNII	PG7JD54X4I
CompTox Dashboard (EPA)	DTXSID3024869
- InChI: InChI=1S/C9H12O2/c1-9(2,11-10)8-6-4-3-5-7-8/h3-7,10H,1-2H3 Key: YQHLDYVWEZKEOX-UHFFFAOYSA-N; InChI=1/C9H12O2/c1-9(2,11-10)8-6-4-3-5-7-8/h3-7,10H,1-2H3 Key: YQHLDYVWEZKEOX-UHFFFAOYAJ
- SMILES: OOC(c1ccccc1)(C)C

Properties
Chemical formula	C_{9}H_{12}O_{2}
Molar mass	152.193 g·mol^{−1}
Appearance	Colorless to pale yellow liquid
Density	1.02 g/cm^{3}
Melting point	−9 °C (16 °F; 264 K)
Boiling point	153 °C (307 °F; 426 K)
Solubility in water	1.5 g/100 mL
Vapor pressure	14 mmHg, at 20 °C

Hazards
- GHS labelling
Pictograms	(GHS02: Flammable) (GHS05: Corrosive) (GHS06: Toxic) (GHS08: Health hazard) (GHS09: Environmental hazard)
Signal word	Danger
Hazard statements	H242, H302, H312, H314, H331, H373, H411
Precautionary statements	P220, P261, P273, P280, P305+P351+P338, P310
NFPA 704 (fire diamond)	1 2 4
Flash point	57 °C (135 °F; 330 K)
Safety data sheet (SDS)	sigmaaldrich.com
- Except where otherwise noted, data are given for materials in their standard state (at 25 °C [77 °F], 100 kPa). verify (what is ?) Infobox references

Cumene hydroperoxide is the organic compound with the formula C_{6}H_{5}C(CH_{3})_{2}OOH; this oily liquid is classified as an organic hydroperoxide. Products of decomposition of cumene hydroperoxide are methylstyrene, acetophenone, and 2-phenylpropan-2-ol.

It is produced by treatment of cumene with oxygen, an autoxidation. At temperatures >100 °C, oxygen is passed through liquid cumene:

C_{6}H_{5}CH(CH_{3})_{2} + O_{2} → C_{6}H_{5}C(CH_{3})_{2}OOH

Dicumyl peroxide is a side product.

== Applications ==
Cumene hydroperoxide is an intermediate in the cumene process for producing phenol and acetone from benzene and propylene.

Cumene hydroperoxide is a radical initiator for production of acrylates.

Cumene hydroperoxide is involved as an organic peroxide in the production of propylene oxide by the oxidation of propylene. This technology was commercialized by Sumitomo Chemical.

The oxidation by cumene hydroperoxide of propylene affords propylene oxide and the byproduct 2-phenylpropan-2-ol. The reaction follows this stoichiometry:

CH_{3}CHCH_{2} + C_{6}H_{5}C(CH_{3})_{2}OOH → CH_{3}CHCH_{2}O + C_{6}H_{5}C(CH_{3})_{2}OH

Dehydrating and hydrogenating cumyl alcohol recycles the cumene.

== Safety ==
Cumene hydroperoxide, like all organic peroxides, is potentially explosive. It is also toxic, corrosive and flammable as well as a skin-irritant.

== Related terms ==
- Cumene process
