= Lacmoid =

Names
- IUPAC name 2-Amino-3,6-bis(2,4-dihydroxyphenyl)-2-phenoxazone
- Other names Resorcein

Identifiers
| CAS Number | 33869-21-5 |
| 3D model (JSmol) | Interactive image |
| ChEMBL | ChEMBL4789704 |
| ChemSpider | 19040159 |
| ECHA InfoCard | 100.156.476 |
| EC Number | 628-183-8 |
| PubChem CID | 3940532 |
| CompTox Dashboard (EPA) | DTXSID70657601 |
- InChI: InChI=1S/C24H16N2O6/c25-17-9-23-18(7-15(17)13-3-1-11(27)5-20(13)29)26-19-8-16(22(31)10-24(19)32-23)14-4-2-12(28)6-21(14)30/h1-10,27-30H,25H2 Key: ABNVFGQXCGFSFH-UHFFFAOYSA-N
- SMILES: O=C1C=C2OC3=CC(N)=C(C=C3N=C2C=C1C=4C=CC(O)=CC4O)C=5C=CC(O)=CC5O

Properties
| Chemical formula | C_{24}H_{16}N_{2}O_{6} |
| Molar mass | 428.400 g·mol^{−1} |

Hazards
- GHS labelling
| Pictograms | (GHS07: Exclamation mark) |
| Signal word | Warning |
| Hazard statements | H315, H319, H335 |
| Precautionary statements | P261, P264, P264+P265, P271, P280, P302+P352, P304+P340, P305+P351+P338, P319, P321, P332+P317, P337+P317, P362+P364, P403+P233, P405, P501 |
- Except where otherwise noted, data are given for materials in their standard state (at 25 °C [77 °F], 100 kPa). Infobox references

Lacmoid is a chemical compound with the formula C_{24}H_{16}N_{2}O_{6}. It is synthesized by reacting sodium nitrite (NaNO_{2}) with resorcinol. It is a pH-sensitive dye which is turned red by acids and is used as a pH indicator under the name of lacmoid. It is usually a black-violet solid.
