= 1,3,5-Triethylbenzene =

Names
- Preferred IUPAC name 1,3,5-Triethylbenzene
- Other names: 1,3,5-TEB; Symmetrical triethylbenzene

Identifiers
| CAS Number | 102-25-0 |
| 3D model (JSmol) | Interactive image |
| ChemSpider | 7320 |
| ECHA InfoCard | 100.002.744 |
| EC Number | 203-017-3 |
| MeSH | 1,3,5-triethylbenzene |
| PubChem CID | 7602 |
| UNII | 02K328WWZQ |
| CompTox Dashboard (EPA) | DTXSID30881228 DTXSID9027867, DTXSID30881228 |
- InChI: InChI=1S/C12H18/c1-4-10-7-11(5-2)9-12(6-3)8-10/h7-9H,4-6H2,1-3H3 Key: WJYMPXJVHNDZHD-UHFFFAOYSA-N
- SMILES: CCC1=CC(=CC(=C1)CC)CC

Properties
| Chemical formula | C_{12}H_{18} |
| Molar mass | 162.27 g·mol^{−1} |
| Appearance | colorless liquid |
| Density | 0.862 g·cm^{−3} |
| Melting point | −66.5 °C (−87.7 °F; 206.7 K) |
| Boiling point | 215 °C (419 °F; 488 K) |
| Solubility in water | practically insoluble |
| Solubility in ethanol, diethyl ether | soluble |

Hazards
- GHS labelling
| Pictograms | (GHS07: Exclamation mark) |
| Signal word | Warning |
| Hazard statements | H315, H319, H413 |
| Precautionary statements | P264, P273, P280, P302+P352, P305+P351+P338, P332+P313 |
| Flash point | 76 °C (169 °F; 349 K) |
- Safety data sheet (SDS)
- Except where otherwise noted, data are given for materials in their standard state (at 25 °C [77 °F], 100 kPa). Infobox references

1,3,5-Triethylbenzene is a chemical compound of the group of aromatic hydrocarbons.

== Preparation ==
1,3,5-Triethylbenzene can be prepared by a Friedel-Crafts alkylation of benzene with ethyl bromide in presence of aluminium chloride.

== Properties ==
1,3,5-Triethylbenzene is a flammable, hard to ignite, colorless liquid that is almost insoluble in water. The refractive index is 1.495

== Uses ==
1,3,5-Triethylbenzene can be used in synthesis of a series of di- and trinucleating ligands.

== Safety notes ==
The vapour of 1,3,5-Triethylbenzene can form an explosive mixture with air (flash point: 76 °C).

== See also ==
- 1,3,5-Triheptylbenzene
