= Cumene =

Organic compound

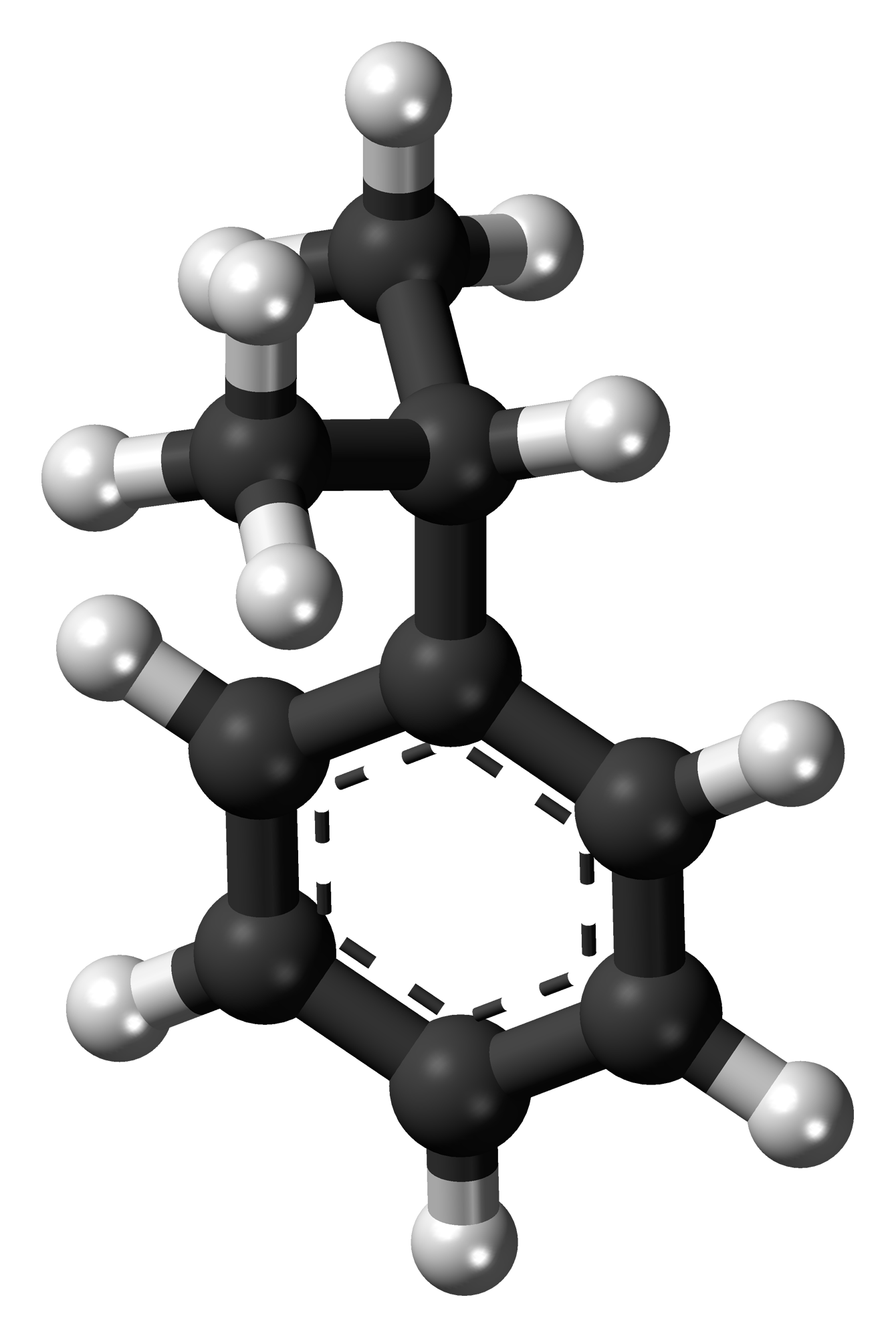

Names
- Preferred IUPAC name (Propan-2-yl)benzene
- Other names: Isopropylbenzene; Cumol; (1-Methylethyl)benzene

Identifiers
CAS Number	98-82-8
3D model (JSmol)	Interactive image
Abbreviations	IPB; Phi-Pr; PhiPr; Ph^{i}Pr; PhCMe_{2}
Beilstein Reference	1236613
ChEBI	CHEBI:34656
ChEMBL	ChEMBL1398949
ChemSpider	7128
ECHA InfoCard	100.002.458
EC Number	202-704-5
KEGG	C14396
PubChem CID	7406
RTECS number	GR8575000
UNII	8Q54S3XE7K
UN number	1918
CompTox Dashboard (EPA)	DTXSID1021827
- InChI: InChI=1S/C9H12/c1-8(2)9-6-4-3-5-7-9/h3-8H,1-2H3 Key: RWGFKTVRMDUZSP-UHFFFAOYSA-N; InChI=1/C9H12/c1-8(2)9-6-4-3-5-7-9/h3-8H,1-2H3 Key: RWGFKTVRMDUZSP-UHFFFAOYAJ
- SMILES: CC(C)c1ccccc1

Properties
Chemical formula	C_{9}H_{12}
Molar mass	120.195 g·mol^{−1}
Appearance	Colorless liquid
Odor	Sharp, gasoline-like
Density	0.862 g cm^{−3}, liquid
Melting point	−96 °C (−141 °F; 177 K)
Boiling point	152 °C (306 °F; 425 K)
Solubility in water	negligible
Solubility	soluble in acetone, ether, ethanol
Vapor pressure	4.5 mmHg (25 °C)
Magnetic susceptibility (χ)	−89.53·10^{−6} cm^{3}/mol
Refractive index (n_{D})	1.4915 (20 °C)
Viscosity	0.777 cP (21 °C)

Hazards
- Occupational safety and health (OHS/OSH)
Main hazards	flammable
- GHS labelling
Pictograms	(GHS02: Flammable) (GHS07: Exclamation mark) (GHS08: Health hazard) (GHS09: Environmental hazard)
Signal word	Danger
Hazard statements	H226, H304, H335, H350, H411
Precautionary statements	P202, P210, P233, P273, P301+P310, P331
NFPA 704 (fire diamond)	2 3 1
Flash point	43 °C (109 °F; 316 K)
Autoignition temperature	424 °C (795 °F; 697 K)
Explosive limits	0.9–6.5%
- Lethal dose or concentration (LD, LC)
LD_{50} (median dose)	12750 mg/kg (oral, mouse); 1400 mg/kg (oral, rat)
LC_{50} (median concentration)	200 ppm (mouse, 7 hr)
LC_{Lo} (lowest published)	8000 ppm (rat, 4 hr)
- NIOSH (US health exposure limits)
PEL (Permissible)	TWA 50 ppm (245 mg/m^{3}) [skin]
REL (Recommended)	TWA 50 ppm (245 mg/m^{3}) [skin]
IDLH (Immediate danger)	900 ppm

Related compounds
Related compounds	ethylbenzene toluene benzene
- Except where otherwise noted, data are given for materials in their standard state (at 25 °C [77 °F], 100 kPa). verify (what is ?) Infobox references

Cumene (isopropylbenzene) is an organic compound that contains a benzene ring with an isopropyl substituent. It is a constituent of crude oil and refined fuels. It is a flammable colorless liquid that has a boiling point of 152 °C. Nearly all the cumene that is produced as a pure compound on an industrial scale is converted to cumene hydroperoxide, which is an intermediate in the synthesis of other industrially important chemicals, primarily phenol and acetone (known as the cumene process).

== Production ==
Commercial production of cumene is by Friedel–Crafts alkylation of benzene with propylene. The original route for manufacturing of cumene was by alkylation of benzene in the liquid phase using sulfuric acid as a catalyst, but because of the complicated neutralization and recycling steps required, together with corrosion problems, this process has been largely replaced. As an alternative, solid phosphoric acid (SPA) supported on alumina has been used as the catalyst.

Reaction of benzene with propylene to give cumene in the presence of phosphoric acid supported on silica and promoted with boron trifluoride

Since the mid-1990s, commercial production has switched to zeolite-based catalysts. In this process, the efficiency of cumene production is generally 70–75%. The remaining components are primarily polyisopropyl benzenes. In 1976, an improved cumene process that uses aluminum chloride as a catalyst was developed. The overall conversion of cumene for this process can be as high as 90%.

The addition of two equivalents of propylene gives diisopropylbenzene (DIPB). Using transalkylation, DIPB is comproportionated with benzene to give cumene.

== Autoxidation ==
Depending on the conditions, autoxidation of cumene gives dicumyl peroxide or cumene hydroperoxide. Both reactions exploit the weakness of the tertiary C–H bond. The tendency of cumene to form peroxides by autoxidation poses safety concerns. Tests for peroxides are routinely conducted before heating or distilling.

== Applications ==
Cumene is frequently found as an ingredient in thread locking fluids. Cumene is also a precursor chemical to the herbicide isoproturon.

== See also ==
- Pseudocumene
