= Cumene process =

Industrial process

First stage of Hock process: alkylation of benzene with propylene.

Second stage of Hock process: autoxidation of cumene.

The cumene process (cumene-phenol process, Hock process) is an industrial process for synthesizing phenol and acetone from benzene and propylene. The term stems from cumene (isopropyl benzene), the intermediate material during the process. It was invented by Rūdolfs Ūdris and Pyotr Sergeyev in 1942 in the Soviet Union, and independently by Heinrich Hock in 1944.

This process converts two relatively cheap starting materials, benzene and propylene, into two more valuable ones, phenol and acetone. Other reactants required are oxygen from air and small amounts of a radical initiator. Most of the worldwide production of phenol and acetone is now based on this method. In 2022, nearly 10.8 million tonnes of phenol was produced by the cumene process. In order for this process to be economical, there must also be demand for the acetone by-product as well as the phenol.

== Steps of the process ==
Cumene is formed in the gas-phase Friedel–Crafts alkylation of benzene by propene. Benzene and propene are compressed together to a pressure of 30 bar at 250 °C in presence of a catalytic Lewis acid. Phosphoric acid is often favored over aluminium halides. Cumene is oxidized in air, which removes the tertiary benzylic hydrogen from cumene and hence forms a cumene radical:

The cumene radical then bonds with an oxygen molecule to give cumene peroxide radical, which in turn forms cumene hydroperoxide (C_{6}H_{5}C(CH_{3})_{2}O_{2}H) by abstracting a benzylic hydrogen from another cumene molecule. This latter cumene converts into cumene radical and feeds back into subsequent chain formations of cumene hydroperoxides. A pressure of 5 atm is used to ensure that the unstable peroxide is kept in liquid state.

Cumene hydroperoxide undergoes a rearrangement reaction in an acidic medium (the Hock rearrangement) to give phenol and acetone. In the first step, the terminal hydroperoxy oxygen atom is protonated. This is followed by a step in which the phenyl group migrates from the benzyl carbon to the adjacent oxygen and a water molecule is lost, producing a resonance stabilized tertiary carbocation. The concerted mechanism of this step is similar to the mechanisms of the Baeyer–Villiger oxidation and Criegee rearrangement reactions, and also the oxidation step of the hydroboration–oxidation process. In 2009, an acidified bentonite clay was proven to be a more economical catalyst than sulfuric acid as the acid medium.

The resulting carbocation is then attacked by water, forming a hemiacetal-like structure. After transfer of a proton from the hydroxy oxygen to the ether oxygen, the ion falls apart into phenol and acetone.

== Related reactions and modifications ==
=== Alternatives to acetone co-production ===
Cyclohexylbenzene can replace isopropylbenzene. Via the Hock rearrangement, cyclohexylbenzene hydroperoxide cleaves to give phenol and cyclohexanone. Cyclohexanone is an important precursor to some nylons.

Starting with the alkylation of benzene with mixture of 1 and 2-butenes, the cumene process produces phenol and butanones.

=== Alternatives to phenol production ===
- Hydroquinone is prepared by dialkylation of benzene with propene to give 1,4-diisopropylbenzene. This compound reacts with air to afford the bis(hydroperoxide). Analogous to the behavior of cumene hydroperoxide, it rearranges in acid to give acetone and hydroquinone. Oxidation of hydroquinone gives 1,4-benzoquinone:
  $$\ce{C6H4(CHMe2)2 + 2 1/2 O2 -> C6H4O2 + 2 OCMe2 + H2O}$$
- Resorcinol is analogously prepared by converting 1,3-Diisopropylbenzene into the bis(hydroperoxide), which fragments to resorcinol and acetone.
- 2-Naphthol can also be produced by a method analogous to the cumene process.
- 3-Chlorophenol, which does not arise by chlorination of phenol, can be produced by cumene process beginning with the alkylation of chlorobenzene with propylene.
- Cresols are produced from isopropyltoluene.

=== Acetone processing ===
Crude acetone is hydrogenated in the liquid phase over Raney nickel or a mixture of copper and chromium oxide to give isopropyl alcohol. This process is useful, when it is coupled with excess acetone production. Mitsui & Co. developed additional step(s) to hydrogenating acetone and dehydrating the isopropanol product to propene, which is recycled as a starting reactant.

=== Byproducts ===
Byproducts of the cumene process to produce phenol and acetone are acetophenone and alpha-methylstyrene.

== See also ==
- Bisphenol A
- Dow process (phenol)
- Friedel Crafts alkylation
- Baeyer–Villiger oxidation
- Raschig–Hooker process (also produces phenol)
