= 4-Hydroxygramine =

Identifiers
- IUPAC name: 3-[(dimethylamino)methyl]-1H-indol-4-ol
- CAS Number: 701898-02-4 1839-67-4
- PubChem CID: 44404899
- ChEMBL: ChEMBL194588

Chemical and physical data
- Formula: C_{11}H_{14}N_{2}O
- Molar mass: 190.246 g·mol^{−1}
- 3D model (JSmol): Interactive image
- SMILES: CN(C)CC1=CNC2=C1C(=CC=C2)O
- InChI: InChI=InChI=1S/C11H14N2O/c1-13(2)7-8-6-12-9-4-3-5-10(14)11(8)9/h3-6,12,14H,7H2,1-2H3; Key:YJJMKVPZBCHYHD-UHFFFAOYSA-N

4-Hydroxygramine is a serotonergic drug and a serotonin antagonist belonging to the class of indole-3-methanamines, a family of indoles with a single-carbon chain that are related to tryptamines.

== Pharmacology ==
=== Pharmacodynamics ===
4-Hydroxygramine is an antagonist of several subtypes of 5-hydroxytryptamine receptors; it has a high affinity for the 5-HT_{2C} receptor, with an affinity (K_{i}) of 24 ± 0.8 nM, followed by binding to the 5-HT_{2A} and 5-HT_{2B} receptors (with K_{i} values of 923 ± 224 and 1242 ± 295, respectively).

== See also ==
- Gramine
