= Resinol =

Skin protectant and topical analgesic

Resinol is a skin protectant and topical analgesic that is made by ResiCal Inc. from Orchard Park, New York. It is an over-the-counter drug that can currently be purchased in 1.25 or 3.3 ounce (35 or 94 g) jars by contacting a local pharmacy's drug wholesaler to order the item or on the Internet. It is an ointment that is beige in color and has a distinctive rubbery scent. It has a tacky consistency and is somewhat difficult to get off undesired body parts it comes into contact with (like one’s fingers after applying it).

== History ==
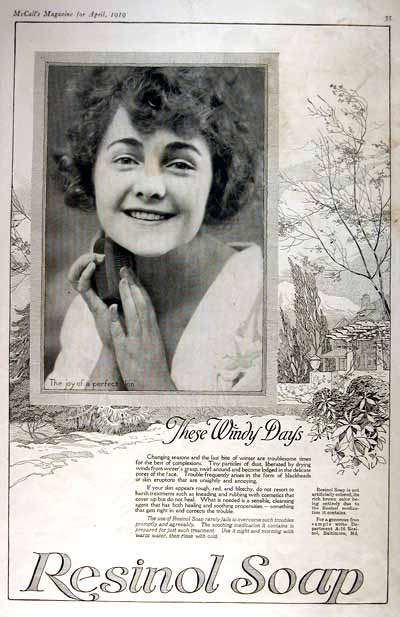
An advertisement for Resinol Soap from a 1919 issue of McCall's Magazine.

Resinol was developed by Dr. Merville Hamilton Carter (1857-1939) in his private practice as treatment for his patients in Baltimore, Maryland during the late 19th century. In 1895, Carter, along with his brother Allan L. Carter and his cousin Henry Stier Dulaney founded the Resinol Chemical Company and began to mass-produce the ointment and other medical products. After over forty years of selling Resinol, the company had John H. Buffham & Co. as an outlet in Great Britain and was a successful global distributor. Henry LeRoy Carter Sr., the son of Dr. Carter, began running the company after the deaths of his father and other staff members. The company's sales began to decline in the 1940s, and after the death of Henry LeRoy Carter Sr. in 1951, his son Henry LeRoy Carter Jr. took the place of his father and grandfather as president of the Resinol Chemical Company. At that time, the company focused more on soap manufacturing, but continued to sell Resinol. For the rest of the 20th century, Resinol's popularity continued to dwindle. It was purchased by ResiCal Inc. in 2002, which at the time was headed by D. Brooks Cole.

== Label Information ==
Resinol is used to treat several different types of skin ailments. It is used to prevent and temporarily protect chafed, chapped, or cracked skin, temporarily relieve pain and itching caused by minor burns, minor cuts and scrapes, minor skin irritations and sunburn, and dry the oozing and weeping of irritation caused by contact with poison ivy, poison oak, and poison sumac.

Adults and children that are two years of age or older should apply Resinol to affected area of skin no more than three to four times a day. A physician should be asked if an application would be appropriate for a child younger than two years.

Resinol is for external uses only. When using it, avoid contact with eyes and do not apply over large areas of the body. Discontinue use and ask a physician if any condition worsens where applied, symptoms last more than seven days, or symptoms clear up and reappear within a few days. Keep out of reach of children. If swallowed, get medical help or contact a poison control center immediately.

The active ingredients used in Resinol are a 55% solution of petroleum jelly and a 2% solution of resorcinol. Calamine, corn starch, lanolin, and zinc oxide comprise the inactive ingredients.

== Past Formulations ==
In the 1980s, Resinol ointment was manufactured by the Mentholatum Company of Buffalo, New York 14213, a maker of liniment. Its ingredients statement then read Zinc Oxide 12% (an antibacterial agent and sunscreen); Calamine 6%; Resorcinol 2% (also an antibacterial).

In the 1960s, Resinol came in an opaque, white glass jar with a metal lid. It was made by the Resinol Chemical Company of Baltimore, Maryland 21201, and the label listed the following ingredients: Resorcinol; Oil of Cade (Cade is a species of prickly juniper native to the regions surrounding the Mediterranean; the oil gave the unguent a medicinal odor); Prepared Calamine; Zinc Oxide; Bismuth Subnitrate (now used mostly in veterinary medicine); Boric Acid (antibacterial); Lanolin; Petrolatum.
