= 2-Phenyl-2-propanol =

Names
- Preferred IUPAC name 2-Phenylpropan-2-ol

Identifiers
CAS Number	617-94-7
3D model (JSmol)	Interactive image
ChEBI	CHEBI:131607
ChEMBL	ChEMBL3185495
ChemSpider	11556
ECHA InfoCard	100.009.582
EC Number	210-539-5
PubChem CID	12053
UNII	JE030BGE05
CompTox Dashboard (EPA)	DTXSID3027247
- InChI: InChI=1S/C9H12O/c1-9(2,10)8-6-4-3-5-7-8/h3-7,10H,1-2H3 Key: BDCFWIDZNLCTMF-UHFFFAOYSA-N
- SMILES: CC(C)(C1=CC=CC=C1)O

Properties
Chemical formula	C_{9}H_{12}O
Molar mass	136.19 g/mol
Appearance	White to pale yellow odorless solid
Density	0.973 g/cm^{3}
Melting point	28–32 °C (301–305 K)
Boiling point	202 °C (396 °F; 475 K)
Solubility in water	Practically insoluble
Solubility	Soluble in ethanol and benzene
Refractive index (n_{D})	1.49146 (20 °C)

Hazards
- GHS labelling
Pictograms	(GHS07: Exclamation mark)
Signal word	Danger
Hazard statements	H302, H315, H319
Precautionary statements	P280, P301+P330+P331, P302+P352, P305+P351+P338, P362
- Lethal dose or concentration (LD, LC)
LD_{50} (median dose)	4300mg/kg (rabbit, transdermal); 1300mg/kg (rat, oral)
- Except where otherwise noted, data are given for materials in their standard state (at 25 °C [77 °F], 100 kPa). Infobox references

2-Phenyl-2-propanol is a chemical compound that belongs to the alcohol group. It is a derivative of cumene.

== Synthesis ==
2-Phenyl-2-propanol can be synthesized through Grignard reaction between phenylmagnesium bromide and acetone.

== Properties ==
2-Phenyl-2-propanol is a white to pale-yellow, odorless solid which is combustible yet difficult to ignite and barely dissolves in water.

== Applications ==
2-Phenyl-2-propanol can either be applied in organic syntheses, or be reactants or intermediates in agrochemical, medical, and dyestuff fields.

2-Phenyl-2-propanol is the main metabolite of cumene, and therefore 2-phenyl-2-propanol can serve as a biomarker of cumene.

== Hazards ==
According to a report of Federal Institute for Risk Assessment in 2008, there is strong evidence that 2-phenyl-2-propanol may lead to allergic reactions for humans.
