= Neophyl chloride =

Names
- Preferred IUPAC name (1-Chloro-2-methylpropan-2-yl)benzene
- Other names (Chloro-tert-butyl)benzene

Identifiers
CAS Number	515-40-2
3D model (JSmol)	Interactive image
ChemSpider	61498
ECHA InfoCard	100.007.453
EC Number	208-197-7
PubChem CID	68191
UNII	OF6E0410NF
CompTox Dashboard (EPA)	DTXSID8027167
- InChI: InChI=1S/C10H13Cl/c1-10(2,8-11)9-6-4-3-5-7-9/h3-7H,8H2,1-2H3 Key: DNXXUUPUQXSUFH-UHFFFAOYSA-N; InChI=1/C10H13Cl/c1-10(2,8-11)9-6-4-3-5-7-9/h3-7H,8H2,1-2H3 Key: DNXXUUPUQXSUFH-UHFFFAOYAJ
- SMILES: ClCC(c1ccccc1)(C)C

Properties
Chemical formula	C_{10}H_{13}Cl
Molar mass	168.663 g/mol
Appearance	colorless liquid
Density	1.047 g/cm^{3}
Boiling point	223 °C (433 °F; 496 K)
Solubility in water	organic solvents

Hazards
- GHS labelling
Pictograms	(GHS07: Exclamation mark)
Signal word	Warning
Hazard statements	H315, H319, H335
Precautionary statements	P261, P264, P264+P265, P271, P280, P302+P352, P304+P340, P305+P351+P338, P319, P321, P332+P317, P337+P317, P362+P364, P403+P233, P405, P501
- Except where otherwise noted, data are given for materials in their standard state (at 25 °C [77 °F], 100 kPa). verify (what is ?) Infobox references

Neophyl chloride, C_{6}H_{5}C(CH_{3})_{2}CH_{2}Cl, is a halogenated organic compound with unusual nucleophilic substitution properties. Neophyl chloride is used to form a versatile organolithium reagent, neophyl lithium, by reaction with lithium.

== Preparation ==
Neophyl chloride was first synthesized by Haller and Ramart from neophyl alcohol by a nucleophilic substitution reaction, using thionyl chloride as the chlorinating agent:

C_{6}H_{5}C(CH_{3})_{2}CH_{2}OH + SOCl_{2} → C_{6}H_{5}C(CH_{3})_{2}CH_{2}Cl + HCl + SO_{2}

It is easily prepared on a large scale from benzene and methallyl chloride by an electrophilic aromatic substitution reaction, using sulfuric acid as the catalyst: The reaction is an example of an electrophilic aromatic substitution reaction.

H_{2}C=C(CH_{3})CH_{2}Cl + C_{6}H_{6} → C_{6}H_{5}C(CH_{3})_{2}CH_{2}Cl

It can also be prepared by free radical halogenation of tert-butylbenzene, using various chlorine donors.

== Reactions and applications ==
Neophyl chloride can be used to form an organolithium reagent, neophyl lithium, by reaction with lithium. Organolithium reagents are useful due to their nucleophilic properties and their ability to form carbon-to-carbon bonds, like in reactions with carbonyls.

C_{6}H_{5}C(CH_{3})_{2}CH_{2}Cl + 2Li → C_{6}H_{5}C(CH_{3})_{2}CH_{2}Li + LiCl

Neophyl chloride is of interest to organic chemists due to its substitution properties. Neophyl chloride is a neopentyl halide which means it is subject to the neopentyl effect. This effect makes S_{N}2 nucleophilic substitution highly unlikely because of steric interactions due to the branching of the β-carbon. No rotamer of the molecule would allow a backside attack of the α carbon.

β-Hydride elimination also does not occur with neophyl derivatives as this group lacks hydrogens at the β positions. These factors make neophyl chloride a precursor to intermediates that resist common substitution and elimination reactions.
