= Hydrodealkylation =

Chemical reaction

Hydrodealkylation is a chemical reaction that often involves reacting an aromatic hydrocarbon, such as toluene, in the presence of hydrogen gas to form a simpler aromatic hydrocarbon devoid of functional groups. An example is the conversion of 1,2,4-trimethylbenzene to xylene. This chemical process usually occurs at high temperature, at high pressure, or in the presence of a catalyst. These are predominantly transition metals, such as chromium or molybdenum.

== Examples ==
- Toluene hydrodealkylation to benzene
- Transalkylation
