= 1,3-Diisopropylbenzene =

Names
- Preferred IUPAC name 1,3-Di(propan-2-yl)benzene
- Other names m-Diisopropylbenzene

Identifiers
CAS Number	99-62-7
3D model (JSmol)	Interactive image
ChEMBL	ChEMBL31352
ChemSpider	7170
ECHA InfoCard	100.002.521
EC Number	202-773-1
PubChem CID	7450
UNII	482VXW192E
CompTox Dashboard (EPA)	DTXSID8026640
- InChI: InChI=1S/C12H18/c1-9(2)11-6-5-7-12(8-11)10(3)4/h5-10H,1-4H3 Key: UNEATYXSUBPPKP-UHFFFAOYSA-N
- SMILES: CC(C)C1=CC(=CC=C1)C(C)C

Properties
Chemical formula	C_{12}H_{18}
Molar mass	162.276 g·mol^{−1}
Appearance	Colorless liquid
Density	0.8559
Melting point	−63 °C (−81 °F; 210 K)
Boiling point	203 °C (397 °F; 476 K)
Solubility in water	0.0425 g/L

Hazards
- GHS labelling
Pictograms	(GHS07: Exclamation mark) (GHS08: Health hazard) (GHS09: Environmental hazard)
Signal word	Warning
Hazard statements	H335, H336, H361, H410
Precautionary statements	P201, P202, P261, P271, P273, P281, P304+P340, P308+P313, P312, P391, P403+P233, P405, P501
Autoignition temperature	449 °C; 840 °F; 722 K
- Except where otherwise noted, data are given for materials in their standard state (at 25 °C [77 °F], 100 kPa). Infobox references

1,3-Diisopropylbenzene is an aromatic hydrocarbon with the formula C_{6}H_{4}(CHMe_{2})_{2} (Me = CH_{3}). It is one of three isomeric diisopropylbenzenes. This colorless liquid is prepared by thermal isomerization of 1,4-diisopropylbenzene over a solid acid catalyst. It is the principal industrial precursor to resorcinol via the Hock rearrangement.
