= Straight-chain terminal alkene =

Alkenes with CnH2n

Straight-chain terminal alkenes, also called linear alpha olefins (LAO) or normal alpha olefins (NAO), are alkenes (olefins) having a chemical formula C_{n}H_{2n}, distinguished from other alkenes with a similar molecular formula by being terminal alkenes, in which the double bond occurs at the alpha (α-, 1- or primary) position, and by having a linear (unbranched) hydrocarbon chain.

1-hexene, a typical linear alpha-olefin

Linear alpha olefins are a range of industrially important alpha-olefins, including 1-butene, 1-hexene, 1-octene, 1-decene, 1-dodecene, 1-tetradecene, 1-hexadecene, 1-octadecene and higher olefin blends of C_{20}-C_{24}, C_{24}-C_{30}, and C_{20}-C_{30} ranges.

== Synthesis ==
=== Overview ===
Industrially, linear alpha olefins are commonly manufactured by two main routes: oligomerization of ethylene and by Fischer–Tropsch synthesis followed by purification. Another route to linear alpha olefins which has been used commercially on small scale is dehydration of alcohols. Prior to about the 1970s, linear alpha olefins were also manufactured by thermal cracking of waxes, whereas linear internal olefins were also manufactured by chlorination/dehydrochlorination of linear paraffins.

There are seven commercial processes which oligomerize ethylene to linear alpha olefins. Five of these processes produce wide distributions of linear alpha olefins. These are the Ethyl Corporation (Ineos) process, Gulf (Chevron Phillips Chemical Company), Shell Oil Company SHOP process, the Idemitsu Petrochemical process and the SABIC-Linde α-Sablin process.

The newest commercial linear alpha olefin process is the Sabic-Linde α-Sablin process, commercialized by SABIC in Saudi Arabia. The α-Sablin process is a low-pressure ethylene oligomerization process conducted over heterogeneous catalyst in a slurry bed. The process also makes a C4-C20+ distribution of alpha-olefins. Sabic announced the commercialization of a 150,000 metric tons per year plant using the α-Sablin process at their Jubail plant on the Gulf coast of Saudi Arabia in 2009. The plant construction was managed by Linde’s subsidiary Linde-KCA-Dresden GmbH, Germany.

Two commercial processes make a single alpha-olefin carbon number. Phillips (CP Chemical Company) ethylene trimerization process, produces only 1-hexene. Another commercial process, offered by a technology licensor IFP, dimerizes ethylene to high purity 1-butene.

There are two alpha-olefin processes that have not been commercialized as of Q2, 2010. One is an ethylene oligomerization to a wide range of linear alpha olefins technology being offered by a technology licensor UOP. The other is the DuPont Versipol technology. To date, no commercial plants have been built using either UOP or DuPont's technology.

The only commercial process to isolate linear alpha olefins from synthetic crude is practiced by Sasol Ltd., a South African oil and gas and petrochemical company. Sasol commercially employs Fischer–Tropsch synthesis to make fuels from synthesis gas derived from coal and recovers 1-hexene from these fuel streams, where the initial linear alpha olefin concentration in a narrow distillation cut may be 60%, with the remainder being vinylidenes, linear and branched internal olefins, linear and branched paraffins, alcohols, aldehydes, carboxylic acids and aromatic compounds.

Dehydration of alcohols to linear alpha olefins by passing alcohols in a vapor phase over acidic alumina catalyst has been practiced periodically by Ethyl Corporation (later BP, now Ineos), Chevron Phillips, Sasol (formerly Vista Chemical) and Godrej Industries Ltd, an Indian petro- and specialty chemical company. Normally, this process is not economical as the linear fatty alcohols are more valuable than the corresponding linear alpha olefins. However, the process has been applied whenever the value of fatty alcohols dipped below that of linear olefins because of market dynamics or regional supply-demand issues.

One of the problems of the linear alpha olefin industry is the wide range of products made by most of the processes. While the Ethyl process makes a pseudo-Poisson distribution of products, most others, including the Sasol process, make a Flory-Schulz distribution. With 8-10 products being made at the same time, with most of them sold into different markets with different dynamics, it is difficult to balance the supply and the demand for all or even most products.

=== Ineos (Ethyl) Process ===
Ethyl linear alpha olefin process is commonly called stoichiometric Ziegler process. It is a two-step process. In the first step, a stoichiometric quantity of triethyl aluminium in olefin diluent is reacted with excess ethylene at high pressure (above 1000 psig) and relatively low temperature (below 400 °F). On the average, nine moles of ethylene are added per mole of triethyl aluminium, resulting in, on average, a tri-octyl aluminium. The distribution of alkyl chains on the aluminium is determined by statistical bell curve distribution except for some smearing to the light side due to the kinetic phenomena and some smearing to the heavy side due to some incorporation of heavier olefins into the chain. Excess ethylene and olefin diluent are flashed off. The heavy aluminium tri-alkyls are reacted with ethylene again in a displacement or a transalkylation reaction, but at high temperature (over 400 °F) and at low pressure (less than 1000 psig) to recover triethyl aluminium and a statistical distribution of linear alpha olefins, which serve as the olefin diluent in the chain-growth step.

=== Chevron Phillips Chemical Company (Gulf) Process ===
The Gulf linear alpha olefin process is commonly called a catalytic Ziegler process. Triethyl aluminium is used as a catalyst, but in catalytic amounts the process is a single-step process. Tri-ethyl aluminium and excess ethylene are fed to a plug flow-reactor. The reaction is conducted at high pressure and high temperature. Excess ethylene is flashed off. The tri-ethyl aluminium catalyst is washed out of the product with caustic and the linear alpha olefins are separated. The product distribution is a Schultz-Flory distribution typical of catalytic processes.

== Applications ==
There are a wide range of applications for linear alpha olefins. The lower carbon numbers, 1-butene, 1-hexene and 1-octene are overwhelmingly used as comonomer in production of polyethylene. High-density polyethylene (HDPE) and linear low-density polyethylene (LLDPE) use approximately 2-4% and 8-10% of comonomers, respectively.

Another significant use of C_{4}-C_{8} linear alpha olefins is for production of linear aldehyde via oxo synthesis (hydroformylation) for later production of short-chain fatty acid, a carboxylic acid, by oxidation of an intermediate aldehyde, or linear alcohols for plasticizer application by hydrogenation of the aldehyde.

The predominant application of 1-decene is in making polyalphaolefin synthetic lubricant basestock (PAO) and to make surfactants in a blend with higher linear alpha olefins.

C_{10}-C_{14} linear alpha olefins are used in making surfactants for aqueous detergent formulations. These carbon numbers may be reacted with benzene to make linear alkyl benzene (LAB), which is further sulfonated to linear alkyl benzene sulfonate (LABS), a popular relatively low cost surfactant for household and industrial detergent applications.

Although some C_{14} alpha olefin is sold into aqueous detergent applications, C_{14} has other applications such as being converted into chloroparaffins. A recent application of C_{14} is as on-land drilling fluid basestock, replacing diesel or kerosene in that application. Although C_{14} is more expensive than middle distillates, it has a significant advantage environmentally, being much more biodegradable and in handling the material, being much less irritating to skin and less toxic.

C_{16} - C_{18} linear olefins find their primary application as the hydrophobes in oil-soluble surfactants and as lubricating fluids themselves. C_{16} - C_{18} alpha or internal olefins are used as synthetic drilling fluid base for high value, primarily off-shore synthetic drilling fluids. The preferred materials for the synthetic drilling fluid application are linear internal olefins, which are primarily made by isomerizing linear alpha-olefins to an internal position. The higher internal olefins appear to form a more lubricious layer at the metal surface and are recognized as a better lubricants. Another significant application for C_{16} - C_{18} olefins is in paper sizing. Linear alpha olefins are, once again, isomerized into linear internal olefins are then reacted with maleic anhydride to make an alkyl succinic anhydride (ASA), a popular paper sizing chemical.

C_{20} - C_{30} linear alpha olefins production capacity is only 5-10% of the total production of a linear alpha olefin plant. They are used in a number of reactive and non-reactive applications, including as feedstocks to make heavy linear alkyl benzene (LAB) and low molecular weight polymers which are used to enhance properties of waxes.
