= Olefin metathesis =

Organic reaction involving the breakup and reassembly of alkene double bonds

Reaction type	Carbon-carbon bond forming reaction

Identifiers
Organic Chemistry Portal	olefin-metathesis
RSC ontology ID	RXNO:0000280

Reaction scheme of the olefin metathesis – changing groups are colored

In organic chemistry, olefin metathesis or alkene metathesis is an organic reaction that entails the redistribution of fragments of alkenes (olefins) by the breaking and regeneration of carbon-carbon double bonds. Because of the relative simplicity of olefin metathesis, it often creates fewer undesired by-products and hazardous wastes than alternative organic reactions. For their elucidation of the reaction mechanism and their discovery of a variety of highly active catalysts, Yves Chauvin, Robert H. Grubbs, and Richard R. Schrock were collectively awarded the 2005 Nobel Prize in Chemistry.

== Catalysts ==
The reaction requires metal catalysts. Most commercially important processes employ heterogeneous catalysts. The heterogeneous catalysts are often prepared by in-situ activation of a metal halide (MCl_{x}) using organoaluminium or organotin compounds, e.g. combining MCl_{x}–EtAlCl_{2}. A typical catalyst support is alumina. Commercial catalysts are often based on molybdenum and ruthenium. Well-defined organometallic compounds have mainly been investigated for small-scale reactions or in academic research. The homogeneous catalysts are often classified as Schrock catalysts and Grubbs catalysts. Schrock catalysts feature molybdenum(VI)- and tungsten(VI)-based centers supported by alkoxide and imido ligands.

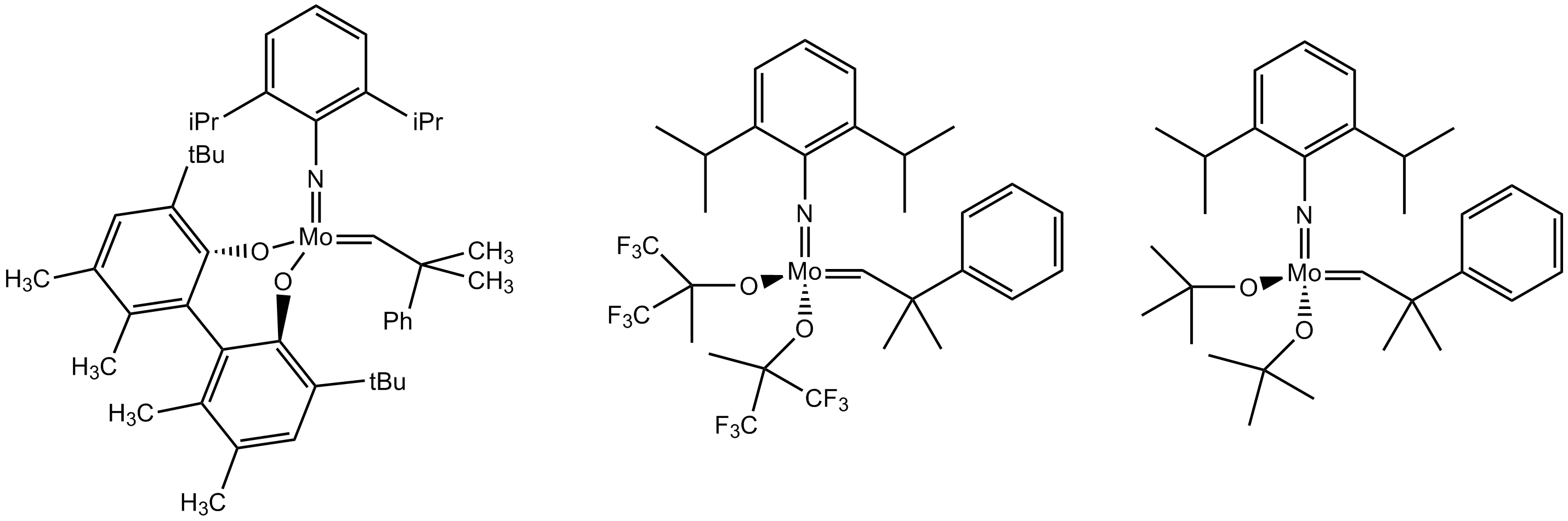
Commercially available schrock catalysts

Grubbs catalysts, on the other hand, are ruthenium(II) carbenoid complexes. Many variations of Grubbs catalysts are known. Some have been modified with a chelating isopropoxybenzylidene ligand to form the related Hoveyda–Grubbs catalyst.

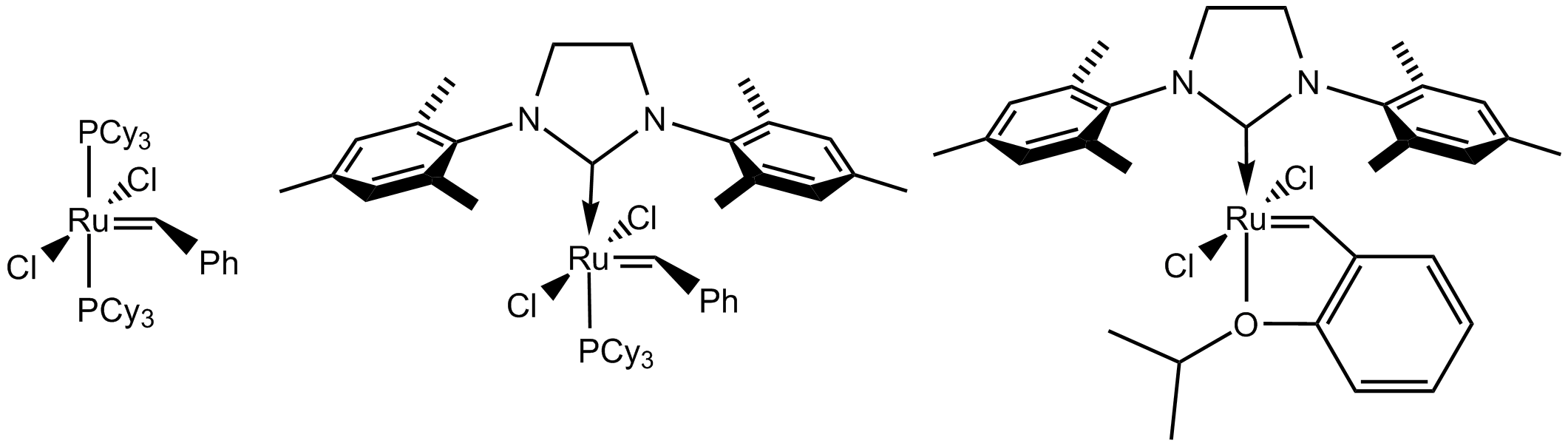
Common Grubbs catalysts

== Applications ==
Olefin metathesis has several industrial applications. Almost all commercial applications employ heterogeneous catalysts using catalysts developed well before the Nobel-Prize winning work on homogeneous complexes. Representative processes include:

- The Phillips Triolefin and the Olefin conversion technology. This process interconverts propylene with ethylene and 2-butenes. Rhenium and molybdenum catalysts are used. Nowadays, only the reverse reaction, i.e., the conversion of ethylene and 2-butene to propylene is industrially practiced, however.
- Shell higher olefin process (SHOP) produces (alpha-olefins) for conversion to detergents. The process recycles certain olefin fractions using metathesis.
- Neohexene production, which involves ethenolysis of isobutene dimers. The catalyst is derived from tungsten trioxide supported on silica and MgO.
- 1,5-Hexadiene and 1,9-decadiene, useful crosslinking agents and synthetic intermediates, are produced commercially by ethenolysis of 1,5-cyclooctadiene and cyclooctene. The catalyst is derived from Re_{2}O_{7} on alumina.

=== Homogeneous catalyst potential ===
Molecular catalysts have been explored for the preparation of a variety of potential applications, such as the synthesis of pharmaceutical drugs, the manufacturing of high-strength materials, the preparation of cancer-targeting nanoparticles, and the conversion of renewable plant-based feedstocks into hair and skin care products.

== Types ==
Some classes of olefin metathesis include:

- Cross metathesis (CM)
- Ring-opening metathesis (ROM)
- Ring-closing metathesis (RCM)
- Ring-opening metathesis polymerization (ROMP)
- Acyclic diene metathesis (ADMET)
- Ethenolysis

== Mechanism ==
Hérisson and Chauvin first proposed the widely accepted mechanism of transition metal alkene metathesis. The direct [2+2] cycloaddition of two alkenes is formally symmetry forbidden and thus has a high activation energy. The Chauvin mechanism involves the [2+2] cycloaddition of an alkene double bond to a transition metal alkylidene to form a metallacyclobutane intermediate. The metallacyclobutane produced can then cycloeliminate to give either the original species or a new alkene and alkylidene. Interaction with the d-orbitals on the metal catalyst lowers the activation energy enough that the reaction can proceed rapidly at modest temperatures.

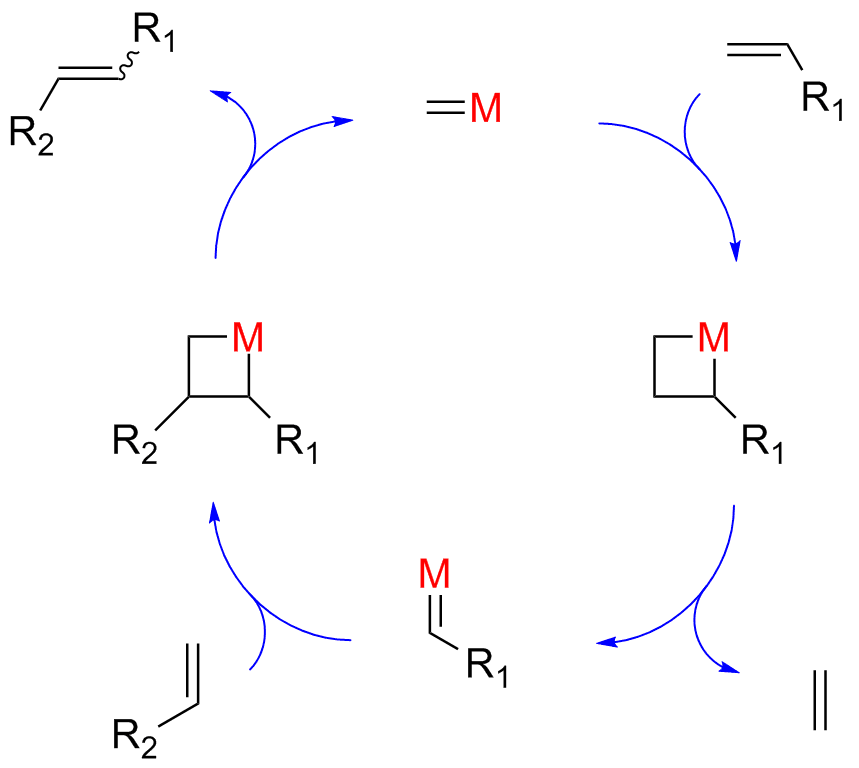
Olefin metathesis mechanism

Olefin metathesis involves little change in enthalpy for unstrained alkenes. Product distributions are determined instead by le Chatelier's Principle, i.e. entropy.

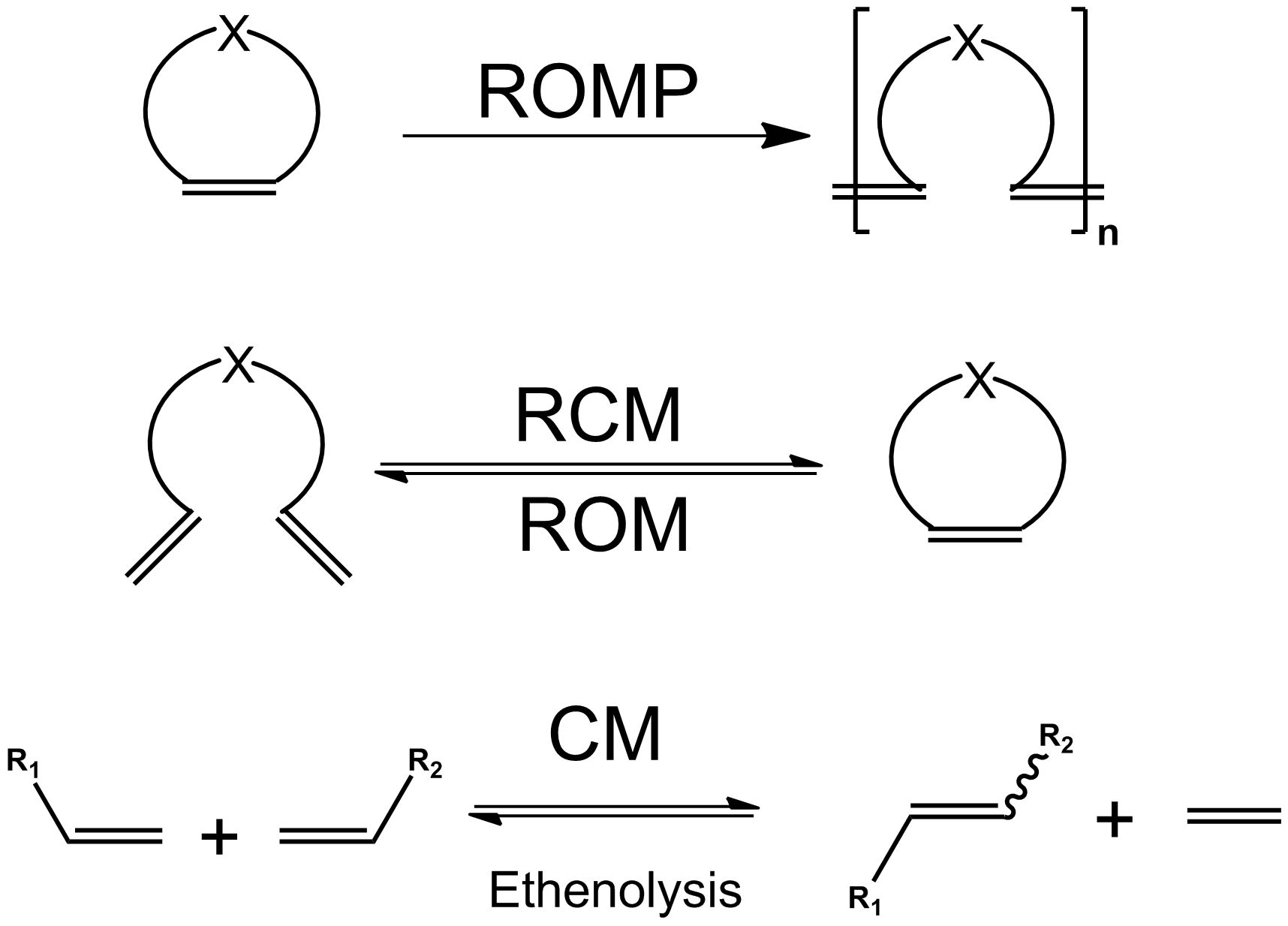
Classification of Olefin metathesis reactions

Cross metathesis and ring-closing metathesis are driven by the entropically favored evolution of ethylene or propylene, which can be removed from the system because they are gases. Because of this CM and RCM reactions often use alpha-olefins. The reverse reaction of CM of two alpha-olefins, ethenolysis, can be favored but requires high pressures of ethylene to increase ethylene concentration in solution. The reverse reaction of RCM, ring-opening metathesis, can likewise be favored by a large excess of an alpha-olefin, often styrene. Ring-opening metathesis usually involves a strained alkene (often a norbornene) and the release of ring strain drives the reaction. Ring-closing metathesis, conversely, usually involves the formation of a five- or six-membered ring, which is enthalpically favorable; although these reactions tend to also evolve ethylene, as previously discussed. RCM has been used to close larger macrocycles, in which case the reaction may be kinetically controlled by running the reaction at high dilutions. The same substrates that undergo RCM can undergo acyclic diene metathesis, with ADMET favored at high concentrations. The Thorpe–Ingold effect may also be exploited to improve both reaction rates and product selectivity.

Cross-metathesis is synthetically equivalent to (and has replaced) a procedure of ozonolysis of an alkene to two ketone fragments followed by the reaction of one of them with a Wittig reagent.

== Historical overview ==
"Olefin metathesis is a child of industry and, as with many catalytic processes, it was discovered by accident." As part of ongoing work in what would later become known as Ziegler–Natta catalysis Karl Ziegler discovered the conversion of ethylene into 1-butene instead of a saturated long-chain hydrocarbon (see nickel effect).

In 1960 a Du Pont research group polymerized norbornene to polynorbornene using lithium aluminum tetraheptyl and titanium tetrachloride (a patent by this company on this topic dates back to 1955),

a reaction then classified as a so-called coordination polymerization. According to the then proposed reaction mechanism a RTiX titanium intermediate first coordinates to the double bond in a pi complex. The second step then is a concerted SNi reaction breaking a CC bond and forming a new alkylidene-titanium bond; the process then repeats itself with a second monomer:

Only much later the polynorbornene was going to be produced through ring opening metathesis polymerisation. The DuPont work was led by Herbert S. Eleuterio. Giulio Natta in 1964 also observed the formation of an unsaturated polymer when polymerizing cyclopentene with tungsten and molybdenum halides.

In a third development leading up to olefin metathesis, researchers at Phillips Petroleum Company in 1964 described olefin disproportionation with catalysts molybdenum hexacarbonyl, tungsten hexacarbonyl, and molybdenum oxide supported on alumina for example converting propylene to an equal mixture of ethylene and 2-butene for which they proposed a reaction mechanism involving a cyclobutane (they called it a quasicyclobutane) – metal complex:

This particular mechanism is symmetry forbidden based on the Woodward–Hoffmann rules first formulated two years earlier. Cyclobutanes have also never been identified in metathesis reactions, which is another reason why it was quickly abandoned.

Then in 1967 researchers led by Nissim Calderon at the Goodyear Tire and Rubber Company described a novel catalyst system for the metathesis of 2-pentene based on tungsten hexachloride, ethanol, and the organoaluminum compound EtAlMe_{2}. The researchers proposed a name for this reaction type: olefin metathesis. Formerly the reaction had been called "olefin disproportionation."

In this reaction 2-pentene forms a rapid (a matter of seconds) chemical equilibrium with 2-butene and 3-hexene. No double bond migrations are observed; the reaction can be started with the butene and hexene as well and the reaction can be stopped by addition of methanol.

The Goodyear group demonstrated that the reaction of regular 2-butene with its all-deuterated isotopologue yielded C_{4}H_{4}D_{4} with deuterium evenly distributed. In this way they were able to differentiate between a transalkylidenation mechanism and a transalkylation mechanism (ruled out):

In 1971 Chauvin proposed a four-membered metallacycle intermediate to explain the statistical distribution of products found in certain metathesis reactions. This mechanism is today considered the actual mechanism taking place in olefin metathesis.

Chauvin's experimental evidence was based on the reaction of cyclopentene and 2-pentene with the homogeneous catalyst tungsten(VI) oxytetrachloride and tetrabutyltin:

The three principal products C9, C10 and C11 are found in a 1:2:1 regardless of conversion. The same ratio is found with the higher oligomers. Chauvin also explained how the carbene forms in the first place: by alpha-hydride elimination from a carbon metal single bond. For example, propylene (C3) forms in a reaction of 2-butene (C4) with tungsten hexachloride and tetramethyltin (C1).

In the same year Pettit who synthesised cyclobutadiene a few years earlier independently came up with a competing mechanism. It consisted of a tetramethylene intermediate with sp^{3} hybridized carbon atoms linked to a central metal atom with multiple three-center two-electron bonds.

Experimental support offered by Pettit for this mechanism was based on an observed reaction inhibition by carbon monoxide in certain metathesis reactions of 4-nonene with a tungsten metal carbonyl

Robert H. Grubbs got involved in metathesis in 1972 and also proposed a metallacycle intermediate but one with four carbon atoms in the ring. The group he worked in reacted 1,4-dilithiobutane with tungsten hexachloride in an attempt to directly produce a cyclomethylenemetallacycle producing an intermediate, which yielded products identical with those produced by the intermediate in the olefin metathesis reaction. This mechanism is pairwise:

In 1973 Grubbs found further evidence for this mechanism by isolating one such metallacycle not with tungsten but with platinum by reaction of the dilithiobutane with cis-bis(triphenylphosphine)dichloroplatinum(II)

In 1975 Katz also arrived at a metallacyclobutane intermediate consistent with the one proposed by Chauvin He reacted a mixture of cyclooctene, 2-butene and 4-octene with a molybdenum catalyst and observed that the unsymmetrical C14 hydrocarbon reaction product is present right from the start at low conversion.

In any of the pairwise mechanisms with olefin pairing as rate-determining step this compound, a secondary reaction product of C12 with C6, would form well after formation of the two primary reaction products C12 and C16.

In 1974 Casey was the first to implement carbenes into the metathesis reaction mechanism:

Grubbs in 1976 provided evidence against his own updated pairwise mechanism:

with a 5-membered cycle in another round of isotope labeling studies in favor of the 4-membered cycle Chauvin mechanism:

In this reaction the ethylene product distribution $(d_4,d_2,d_0)$ at low conversion was found to be consistent with the carbene mechanism. On the other hand, Grubbs did not rule out the possibility of a tetramethylene intermediate.

The first practical metathesis system was introduced in 1978 by Tebbe based on the (what later became known as the) Tebbe reagent. In a model reaction isotopically labeled carbon atoms in isobutene and methylenecyclohexane switched places:

The Grubbs group then isolated the proposed metallacyclobutane intermediate in 1980 also with this reagent together with 3-methyl-1-butene:

They isolated a similar compound in the total synthesis of capnellene in 1986:

In that same year the Grubbs group proved that metathesis polymerization of norbornene by Tebbe's reagent is a living polymerization system and a year later Grubbs and Schrock co-published an article describing living polymerization with a tungsten carbene complex While Schrock focussed his research on tungsten and molybdenum catalysts for olefin metathesis, Grubbs started the development of catalysts based on ruthenium, which proved to be less sensitive to oxygen and water and therefore more functional group tolerant.

=== Grubbs catalysts ===
In the 1960s and 1970s various groups reported the ring-opening polymerization of norbornene catalyzed by hydrated trichlorides of ruthenium and other late transition metals in polar, protic solvents. This prompted Robert H. Grubbs and coworkers to search for well-defined, functional group tolerant catalysts based on ruthenium. The Grubbs group successfully polymerized the 7-oxo norbornene derivative using ruthenium trichloride, osmium trichloride as well as tungsten alkylidenes. They identified a Ru(II) carbene as an effective metal center and in 1992 published the first well-defined, ruthenium-based olefin metathesis catalyst, (PPh_{3})_{2}Cl_{2}Ru=CHCH=CPh_{2}:

The corresponding tricyclohexylphosphine complex (PCy_{3})_{2}Cl_{2}Ru=CHCH=CPh_{2} was also shown to be active. This work culminated in the now commercially available 1st generation Grubbs catalyst.

=== Schrock catalysts ===
Schrock entered the olefin metathesis field in 1979 as an extension of work on tantalum alkylidenes. The initial result was disappointing as reaction of CpTa(=CH−t−Bu)Cl_{2} with ethylene yielded only a metallacyclopentane, not metathesis products:

But by tweaking this structure to a PR_{3}Ta(CHt−bu)(Ot−bu)_{2}Cl (replacing chloride by t-butoxide and a cyclopentadienyl by an organophosphine, metathesis was established with cis-2-pentene. In another development, certain tungsten oxo complexes of the type W(O)(CHt−Bu)(Cl)_{2}(PEt)_{3} were also found to be effective.

Schrock alkylidenes for olefin metathesis of the type Mo(NAr)(CHC(CH_{3})_{2}R){OC(CH_{3})(CF_{3})_{2}}_{2} were commercialized starting in 1990.

The first asymmetric catalyst followed in 1993

With a Schrock catalyst modified with a BINOL ligand in a norbornadiene ROMP leading to highly stereoregular cis, isotactic polymer.

== See also ==
- Alkane metathesis
- Alkyne metathesis
- Enyne metathesis
- Salt metathesis reaction
