= Chromium(III) 2-ethylhexanoate =

Names
- IUPAC name Chromium(3+) 2-ethylhexanoate
- Other names Chromium(3+) tris(2-ethylhexanoate); 2-Ethylhexanoic acid chromium(III) salt AR-1I2320; CID103012

Identifiers
CAS Number	3444-17-5
3D model (JSmol)	Interactive image
ChemSpider	93064
ECHA InfoCard	100.020.326
EC Number	222-357-3
PubChem CID	103012
CompTox Dashboard (EPA)	DTXSID70890576
- InChI: InChI=1S/3C8H16O2.Cr/c3*1-3-5-6-7(4-2)8(9)10;/h3*7H,3-6H2,1-2H3,(H,9,10);/q;;;+3/p-3 Key: WBKDDMYJLXVBNI-UHFFFAOYSA-K
- SMILES: CCCCC(CC)C(=O)[O-].CCCCC(CC)C(=O)[O-].CCCCC(CC)C(=O)[O-].[Cr+3]

Properties
Chemical formula	C_{24}H_{45}CrO_{6}
Molar mass	481.6 g/mol
Appearance	Green
Density	1.01 g/cm^{3}
Solubility in water	soluble in mineral spirits

Hazards
- Occupational safety and health (OHS/OSH)
Main hazards	Harmful by inhalation, in contact with skin and if swallowed, Irritating to eyes, respiratory system and skin
- GHS labelling
Pictograms	(GHS07: Exclamation mark) (GHS08: Health hazard)
Signal word	Warning
Hazard statements	H302, H312, H315, H317, H319, H361
Precautionary statements	P201, P202, P261, P264, P270, P272, P280, P281, P301+P312, P302+P352, P305+P351+P338, P308+P313, P312, P321, P322, P330, P332+P313, P333+P313, P337+P313, P362, P363, P405, P501
Flash point	110 °C (230 °F; 383 K)
- NIOSH (US health exposure limits)
PEL (Permissible)	TWA 1 mg/m^{3}
REL (Recommended)	TWA 0.5 mg/m^{3}
IDLH (Immediate danger)	250 mg/m^{3}
Safety data sheet (SDS)	MSDS
- Except where otherwise noted, data are given for materials in their standard state (at 25 °C [77 °F], 100 kPa). Infobox references

Chromium(III) 2-ethylhexanoate, C_{24}H_{45}CrO_{6}, is a coordination complex of chromium and ethylhexanoate. In combination with 2,5-dimethylpyrrole it forms the Phillips selective ethylene trimerisation catalyst (not to be confused with Phillips catalyst), used in the industrial production of linear alpha olefins, particularly 1-hexene or 1-octene.

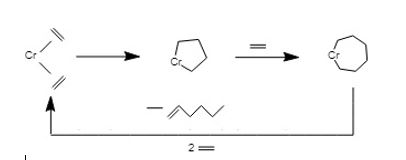
