= Polyolefin =

Family of related polymers

Segment of polyethylene, the most common polyolefin

A polyolefin is a type of polymer with the general formula (CH_{2}CHR)_{n} where R is H or an alkyl group. The name of each polyolefin indicates the olefin from which it is prepared; for example, polyethylene is derived from ethylene, and polymethylpentene is derived from 4-methyl-1-pentene. Polyolefins are not olefins themselves because the double bond of each olefin monomer is opened in order to form the polymer. Monomers having more than one double bond such as butadiene and isoprene yield polymers that contain double bonds (polybutadiene and polyisoprene) and are usually not considered polyolefins. Polymers derived from polar monomers are also usually excluded from this classification. Polyolefins are the foundations of many chemical industries.

== Polyethylene and polypropylene ==
Although many specialized kinds of polyolefins are known, two families dominate: polyethylene (PE) and polypropylene (PP). Within the realm of polyethylene, variations involve the incorporation of comonomers. Introduced at the level of a few percent, these components strongly affect the properties of the polyethylene. Comonomers include 1-octene, 1-hexene, etc. In some cases the resulting polyethylenes are referred to as ethylene-octene, ethylene-hexene, etc. copolymers.

1-hexene, an example of an alpha-olefin

Within the realm of polypropylene, variations involve the tacticity (stereochemistry or connectivity) of the individual propylene subunits. The methyl branch groups on a polypropylene polymer are not long enough to make typical commercial polypropylene more flexible than polyethylene.

=== Production ===
The polymerization of ethylene and propylene is highly exothermic but still requires catalysts. For polyethylene, Ziegler–Natta catalysts are often used. Named after the Nobel laureates Karl Ziegler and Giulio Natta, these catalysts are prepared by treating titanium chlorides with organoaluminium compounds, such as triethylaluminium. In some cases, the catalyst is used as a slurry. Chromium-containing Phillips catalysts are used also. When applied to the polymerization of ethylene, these catalysts produce high density polyethylene (HDPE) and linear (vs branched) low density polyethylene (LLDPE). Kaminsky catalysts represent a related family of catalysts but are homogeneous (soluble in reaction medium). Because all catalytic centers are identical ("single site"), Kaminsky catalysts are particularly amenable to systematic changes to modify the tacticity of the polymer, especially applicable to polypropylene.

Branched forms of polyethylene, so-called low density polyethylene (LDPE), are produced by free-radical-catalysis. The reaction is conducted at high temperatures (>200 °C) and high pressures. A suitable initiator is azobisisobutyronitrile (AIBN), which breaks down to give alkyl radicals.

=== Properties ===
Properties, which range from liquid-like to rigid solids, are primarily determined by their molecular weight and degree of crystallinity. Degrees of crystallinity range from 0% (liquidlike) to 60% or higher (rigid plastics). Crystallinity is primarily governed by the lengths of polymer's crystallizable sequences established during polymerization. Examples include adding a small percentage of comonomer like 1-hexene or 1-octene during the polymerization of ethylene, or occasional irregular insertions ("stereo" or "regio" defects) during the polymerization of isotactic propylene. The polymer's ability to crystallize to high degrees decreases with increasing content of defects.

Low degrees of crystallinity (0–20%) are associated with liquidlike-to-elastomeric properties. Intermediate degrees of crystallinity (20–50%) are associated with ductile thermoplastics, and degrees of crystallinity over 50% are associated with rigid and sometimes brittle plastics.

Polyolefins lack polar substituents. This deprives these materials of certain properties, in particular dye-ability and adhesion. Those properties require the incorporation of polar groups.

=== Joining and welding ===
They inherently have very low surface energies. As a result, thermal welding is a common bonding technique.

They have excellent chemical resistance and are unaffected by common solvents. Consequently, polyolefins are not amenable to solvent welding. They can be adhesively bonded after surface treatment, and by some superglues (cyanoacrylates) and reactive (meth)acrylate glues.

=== Uses ===
Polyethylene:

- HDPE: film (wrapping of goods), blow molding (e.g. bottles), injection molding (e.g., toys, screw caps), extrusion coating (e.g., coating on milk cartons), piping for distributing water and gas, wire and cable insulation.
- LDPE: mainly (70%) used for film.

Polypropylene:

- injection molding, fibers, and film. Compared to polyethylene, polypropylene is stiffer but less prone to breaking. It is less dense but shows more chemical resistance.
- automotive applications, polypropylene is commonly used in car bumpers, interior trims, and other components where TiO₂ is added to improve the UV stability of the plastic, ensuring that parts do not degrade or lose color when exposed to sunlight over time. Polyethylene films are widely used in agriculture for greenhouses, mulching, and silage wraps.

== Poly-α-olefin ==
Turning to more specialized monomers, alpha-olefins such as 1-decene down to butenes are used to produce polyalpha-olefins such as polybutene. Polymerization can be catalyzed by boron trifluoride-based systems, i.e., Friedel–Crafts oligomerization, using alcohols as co-catalysts. The polymerization mechanism involves carbocations in contrast to the methods used for PE and PP. Because these poly-alpha-olefins have flexible alkyl groups on every other carbon of their backbone, they tend to be oily, viscous liquids even at lower temperatures. Low molecular weight poly-alpha-olefins are useful as synthetic lubricants such as synthetic motor oils for vehicles and can be used over a wide temperature range. Other specialized polyolefins include polyisobutylene and polymethylpentene. They are all colorless or white oils or solids.

Hydrogenated polyalphaolefin (PAO) is used as a radar coolant. Head makes polyolefin tennis racket strings. Polyolefin is also used in pharmaceutical and medical industry for HEPA filter certification—a PAO aerosol is passed through the filters and the air that exits is measured with an aerosol detector.

== Recycling ==
Recycling of polyolefins usually focuses on the recycling of plastics. In principle the plastics or their component polymers could be recycled back to monomers, from which polymers could be again made. In practice, polyolefins are not recycled except for some use as fuels.

== See also ==
Some thermoplastic polyolefins
low-density polyethylene (LDPE),
linear low-density polyethylene (LLDPE),
very-low-density polyethylene (VLDPE),
ultra-low-density polyethylene (ULDPE),
medium-density polyethylene (MDPE),
polypropylene (PP),
polymethylpentene (PMP),
stereo-block PP,
olefin block copolymers,
propylene–butane copolymers;
Polyolefin elastomers (POE)
polyisobutylene (PIB),
ethylene propylene rubber (EPR),
ethylene propylene diene monomer (M-class) rubber (EPDM rubber).
