= Decene =

Organic compound (C10H20)

Names
- Preferred IUPAC name Dec-1-ene
- Other names Alpha Olefin C10; Decylene; α-Decene; 1-decene

Identifiers
| CAS Number | 872-05-9 |
| 3D model (JSmol) | Interactive image |
| ChEBI | CHEBI:87315 |
| ChEMBL | ChEMBL3187990 |
| ChemSpider | 12809 |
| ECHA InfoCard | 100.011.654 |
| EC Number | 212-819-2 |
| PubChem CID | 13381 |
| RTECS number | HE2071401 |
| UNII | 7O4U4C718P |
| UN number | 3295, 1993 |
| CompTox Dashboard (EPA) | DTXSID8027329 |
- InChI: InChI=1S/C10H20/c1-3-5-7-9-10-8-6-4-2/h3H,1,4-10H2,2H3 Key: AFFLGGQVNFXPEV-UHFFFAOYSA-N; InChI=1/C10H20/c1-3-5-7-9-10-8-6-4-2/h3H,1,4-10H2,2H3 Key: AFFLGGQVNFXPEV-UHFFFAOYAO
- SMILES: CCCCCCCCC=C

Properties
| Chemical formula | C_{10}H_{20} |
| Molar mass | 140.270 g·mol^{−1} |
| Density | 0.74 g/cm^{3} |
| Melting point | −66.3 °C (−87.3 °F; 206.8 K) |
| Boiling point | 172 °C (342 °F; 445 K) |

Hazards
- GHS labelling
| Pictograms | (GHS02: Flammable) (GHS08: Health hazard) (GHS09: Environmental hazard) |
| Signal word | Danger |
| Hazard statements | H226, H304, H410 |
| Precautionary statements | P210, P233, P240, P241, P242, P243, P273, P280, P301+P310, P303+P361+P353, P331, P370+P378, P391, P403+P235, P405, P501 |

Related compounds
| Related Alkenes | Octene; Nonene; Undecene; Dodecene |
| Related compounds | Decane; Decanol |
- Except where otherwise noted, data are given for materials in their standard state (at 25 °C [77 °F], 100 kPa). verify (what is ?) Infobox references

Decene /dɛkiːn/ is an organic compound with the chemical formula C_{10}H_{20}. Decene contains a chain of ten carbon atoms with one double bond, making it an alkene. There are many isomers of decene depending on the position and geometry of the double bond. Dec-1-ene is the only isomer of industrial importance. As an alpha olefin, it is used as a comonomer in copolymers and is an intermediate in the production of epoxides, amines, oxo alcohols, synthetic lubricants, synthetic fatty acids and alkylated aromatics.

The industrial processes used in the production of dec-1-ene are oligomerization of ethylene by the Ziegler process or by the cracking of petrochemical waxes.

In ethenolysis, methyl oleate, the methyl ester of oleic acid, converts to 1-decene and methyl 9-decenoate:

$$\overset{\text{methyl oleate}}{\ce{CH3(CH2)7CH=CH(CH2)7CO2Me}} + {\color{red}\ce{CH2=CH2}} \longrightarrow \overset{\text{1-decene}}{\ce{CH3(CH2)7CH=}{\color{red}\ce{CH2}}} + \overset{\text{9-decenoate}}{\ce{MeO2C(CH2)7CH=}{\color{red}\ce{CH2}}}$$

Dec-1-ene has been isolated from the leaves and rhizome of the plant Farfugium japonicum and has been detected as the initial product in the microbial degradation of n-decane.
