= C8H16 =

The molecular formula C_{8}H_{16} (molar mass: 112.21 g/mol, exact mass: 112.1252 u) may refer to:

- Cyclooctane
- Methylcycloheptane
- Dimethylcyclohexanes
- Ethylcyclohexane
- Diisobutylene
- Octenes
  - 1-Octene
