= Ethenolysis =

Chemical process in which olefins are degraded with ethylene

In organic chemistry, ethenolysis is a chemical process in which internal olefins are degraded using ethylene (H_{2}C=CH_{2}) as the reagent. The reaction is an example of cross metathesis. The utility of the reaction is driven by the low cost of ethylene as a reagent and its selectivity. It produces compounds with terminal alkene functional groups (α-olefins), which are more amenable to other reactions such as polymerization and hydroformylation.

The general reaction equation is:

$$\ce{A=B} + {\color{red}\ce{CH2=CH2}} \longrightarrow \ce{A=}{\color{red}\ce{CH2}} + \ce{B=}{\color{red}\ce{CH2}}$$

Ethenolysis is a form of methylenation, i.e., the installation of methylene (−CH_{2}−) groups.

== Applications ==
=== Terminal alkenes ===
Using ethenolysis, higher molecular weight internal alkenes can be converted to more valuable terminal alkenes. The Shell higher olefin process (SHOP process) uses ethenolysis on an industrial scale. SHOP α-olefin mixtures are first separated by distillation. Higher molecular weight fractions are isomerized by alkaline alumina catalysts in the liquid phase. The resulting internal olefins are reacted with ethylene to regenerate α-olefins. The large excess of ethylene moves the reaction equilibrium to the terminal α-olefins. Catalysts are often prepared from rhenium(VII) oxide (Re_{2}O_{7}) supported on alumina.

=== Perfume ===
In one application, neohexene, a precursor to perfumes, is prepared by ethenolysis of diisobutene:

$$\overset{\text{diisobutene}}{\ce{(CH3)3C-CH=C(CH3)2}} + {\color{red}\ce{CH2=CH2}} \longrightarrow \overset{\text{neohexane}}{\ce{(CH3)3C-CH=}{\color{red}\ce{CH2}}} +  \ce{(CH3)2C=}{\color{red}\ce{CH2}}$$

α,ω-Dienes, i.e., diolefins of the formula (CH_{2})_{n}(CH=CH_{2})_{2}, are prepared industrially by ethenolysis of cyclic alkenes. For example, 1,5-hexadiene, a useful crosslinking agent and synthetic intermediate, is produced from 1,5-cyclooctadiene:

$$\ce{(CH2CH=CHCH2)2} + 2{\color{red}\ce{CH2=CH2}} \longrightarrow  \ce{2(CH2)2(CH=}{\color{red}\ce{CH2}}\ce{)2}$$

The catalyst is derived from rhenium(VII) oxide supported on alumina. 1,9-Decadiene, a related species, is produced similarly from cyclooctene.

=== Decenoic acid ===
In an application directed at using renewable feedstocks, methyl oleate, derived from natural seed oils, can be converted to 1-decene and methyl 9-decenoate:

$$\ce{CH3(CH2)7CH=CH(CH2)7CO2Me}  +  {\color{red}\ce{CH2=CH2}}  \longrightarrow \ce{CH3(CH2)7CH=}{\color{red}\ce{CH2}}  +  \ce{MeO2C(CH2)7CH=}{\color{red}\ce{CH2}}$$

=== Polyethylene and polypropylene recycling ===
Mixed polyolefins can be recycled via high selectivity isomerizing ethenolysation using a sodium on alumina catalyst followed by olefin metathesis using a stream of ethylene gas flowing into a reaction chamber containing a tungsten oxide on silica catalyst, albeit at high temperature. Carbon atoms freed by the breaking carbon-carbon bonds attach to ethylene molecules. Polyethylene is first converted to propylene, while polypropylene is ultimately converted to a mixture of propylene and isobutylene.
