= Hydrovinylation =

Organic reaction which inserts an alkene into a C-H bond of ethylene

In organic chemistry, hydrovinylation is the formal insertion of an alkene into the C-H bond of ethylene (H_{2}C=CH_{2}):

CH_{2}=CHR + CH_{2}=CH_{2} → CH_{3}−CHR−CH=CH_{2}

The more general reaction, hydroalkenylation, is the formal insertion of an alkene into the C-H bond of any terminal alkene. The reaction is catalyzed by metal complexes. A representative reaction is the conversion of styrene and ethylene to 3-phenybutene:

$$\ce{PhCH=CH2} + {\color{red}\ce{CH2=CH2}} \longrightarrow {\color{red}\ce{H -}}\ce{CH2-CH(Ph)}{\color{red}\ce{-CH=CH2}}$$

== Ethylene dimerization ==
The dimerization of ethylene which gives 1-butene is another example of a hydrovinylation. In the Dimersol and Alphabutol Processes, alkenes are dimerized for the production of gasoline and for comonomers such as 1-butene. These processes operate at several refineries across the world at the scales of about 400,000 tons/year (2006 report). 1-Butene is amenable to isomerization to 2-butenes, which is used in olefin conversion technology to give propylene.

== In organic synthesis ==
The addition can be done highly regio- and stereoselectively, although the choices of metal, ligands, and counterions often play very important role. Many metals have also been demonstrated to form active catalysts, including nickel and cobalt.

In a stoichiometric version of a hydrovinylation reaction, nucleophiles add to an electrophilic transition metal alkene complex, forming a C-C bond. The resulting metal alkyl undergoes beta-hydride elimination, liberating the vinylated product.

== Hydroarylation ==
Hydroarylation is again a special case of hydrovinylation. Hydroarylation has been demonstrated for alkyne and alkene substrates. An early example was provided by the Murai reaction, which involves the insertion of alkenes into a C-H bond of acetophenone. The keto group directs the regiochemistry, stabilizing an aryl intermediate.

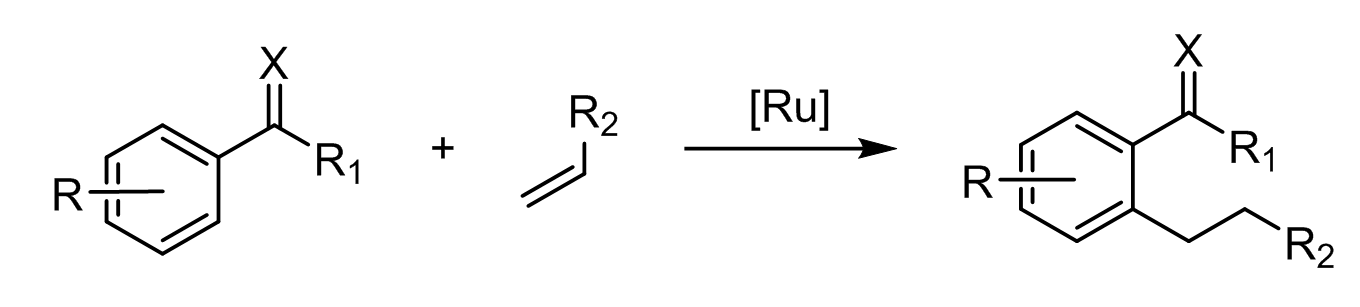
A Murai reaction (X = directing group, typically X = O).

When catalyzed by palladium carboxylates, a key step is electrophilic aromatic substitution to give a Pd(II) aryl intermediate. Gold behaves similarly. Hydropyridination is a similar reaction, but entails addition of a pyridyl-H bond to alkenes and alkynes.

== See also ==
- Vinylation, the process of affixing a vinyl group
