= C18H30 =

The molecular formula C_{18}H_{30} (molar mass: 246.44 g/mol, exact mass: 246.2348 u) may refer to:

- Dodecylbenzene
- Estrane
