= Olefin conversion technology =

Industrial process

Olefin Conversion Technology, also called the Phillips Triolefin Process, is the industrial process that interconverts propylene with ethylene and 2-butenes. The process is also called the ethylene to propylene (ETP) process. In ETP, ethylene is dimerized to 1-butene, which is isomerized to 2-butenes. The 2-butenes are then subjected to metathesis with ethylene.

Rhenium- and molybdenum-containing heterogeneous catalysis are used. Nowadays, only the "reverse" reaction is practiced, i.e., the conversion of ethylene and 2-butene to propylene:

CH_{2}=CH_{2} + CH_{3}CH=CHCH_{3} → 2 CH_{2}=CHCH_{3}

The technology is founded on an olefin metathesis reaction discovered at Phillips Petroleum Company. The originally described process employed catalysts molybdenum hexacarbonyl, tungsten hexacarbonyl, and molybdenum oxide supported on alumina.
