= 2-Methyldodecane =

Names
- Preferred IUPAC name 2-Methyldodecane
- Other names Isotridecane

Identifiers
CAS Number	1560-97-0
3D model (JSmol)	Interactive image
ChemSpider	14535
EC Number	271-369-5
PubChem CID	15270
UNII	A6360WD7Y3
CompTox Dashboard (EPA)	DTXSID20873238 DTXSID3028714, DTXSID20873238
- InChI: InChI=1S/C13H28/c1-4-5-6-7-8-9-10-11-12-13(2)3/h13H,4-12H2,1-3H3 Key: HGEMCUOAMCILCP-UHFFFAOYSA-N
- SMILES: CCCCCCCCCCC(C)C

Properties
Chemical formula	C_{13}H_{28}
Molar mass	184.367 g·mol^{−1}
Density	0.754 g·cm^{−3}（20 °C）
Boiling point	103–104 °C (376–377 K)（10.5 Torr） 227.7±3.0 °C（760 Torr）

Hazards
- GHS labelling
Pictograms	(GHS08: Health hazard)
Signal word	Danger
Hazard statements	H304, H372, H373
Precautionary statements	P260, P264, P270, P301+P310, P314, P331, P405, P501
- Except where otherwise noted, data are given for materials in their standard state (at 25 °C [77 °F], 100 kPa). Infobox references

2-Methyldodecane, an organic compound with a chemical formula C_{13}H_{28}, is an isomer of tridecane. It is produced by the reaction of 1-bromodecane and diisopropyl zinc. Reaction of decylmagnesium bromide and 2-bromopropane produce 2-methyldodecane too. Another method to produce 2-methyldodecane is react 1-dodecene and trimethylaluminium.
