= C12H24 =

The molecular formula C_{12}H_{24} (molar mass: 168.32 g/mol, exact mass: 168.1878 u) may refer to:

- Cyclododecane
- 1-Dodecene
