= Capnellene =

- (−)-Δ^{9(12)}-capnellene

Names
- Preferred IUPAC name (3aS,3bS,6aS,7aS)-4,4,6a-trimethyl-3-methylidene-1,2,3a,3b,5,6,7,7a-octahydrocyclopenta[a]pentalene
- Other names Capnellene, Δ^{9(12)}-capnellene

Identifiers
| CAS Number | 68349-51-9 |
| 3D model (JSmol) | Interactive image |
| ChEBI | CHEBI:192742 |
| ChemSpider | 9129904 |
| PubChem CID | 10954687 |
| UNII | SG3NV38D3K |
| CompTox Dashboard (EPA) | DTXSID601029730 |
- InChI: InChI=1S/C15H24/c1-10-5-6-11-9-15(4)8-7-14(2,3)13(15)12(10)11/h11-13H,1,5-9H2,2-4H3/t11-,12-,13-,15-/m0/s1 Key: YZTNUNFLAAHBMK-ABHRYQDASA-N
- SMILES: C1(=C)\[C@H]2[C@@H](CC1)C[C@]3([C@@H]2C(C)(C)CC3)C

Properties
| Chemical formula | C_{15}H_{24} |
| Molar mass | 204.357 |

Hazards
- Occupational safety and health (OHS/OSH)
| Main hazards | flammable |
- Except where otherwise noted, data are given for materials in their standard state (at 25 °C [77 °F], 100 kPa). verify (what is ?) Infobox references

Capnellene is a naturally occurring tricyclic hydrocarbon derived from Capnella imbricata, a species of soft coral found in Indonesia. Since the 1970s, capnellene has been targeted for synthesis by numerous investigators due to its stereochemistry, functionality, and the interesting geometry of the carbon skeleton. Many alcohol derivatives of capnellene have demonstrated potential as a chemotherapeutic agent with antibacterial, anti-inflammatory and anti-tumor properties.

== Structure ==
Δ^{9(12)}-capnellene, also referred to simply as capnellene in the literature, is a monounsaturated hydrocarbon of the molecular formula C_{15}H_{24}. It features a tricyclic skeleton, a geminal dimethyl group, a tertiary methyl group, and an exocyclic methylene group.

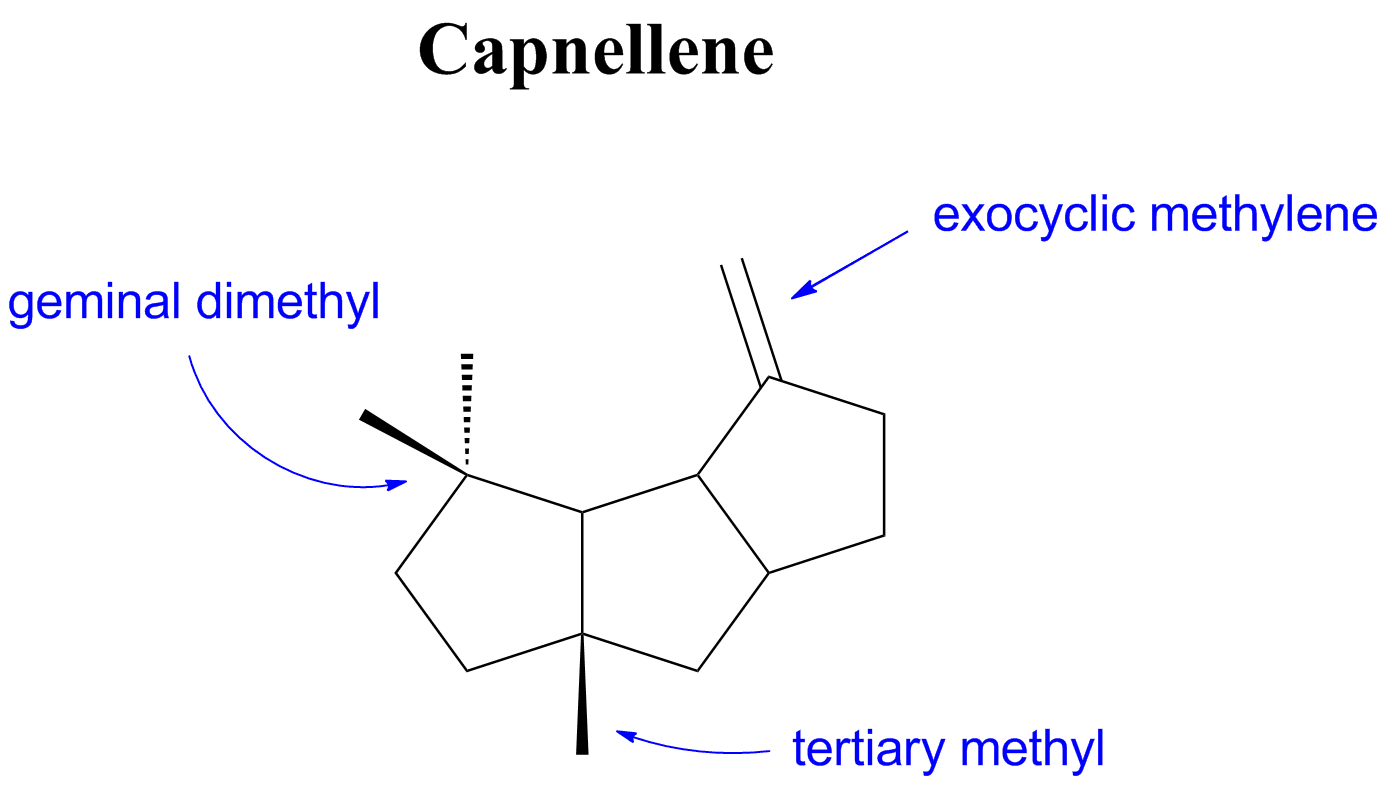

Capnellene is also a sesquiterpene, a class of terpenes that are natural semiochemicals. However, it is a non-isoprenoid sesquiterpene, meaning that unlike most sesquiterpenes its structure is not based on a repeated isoprene unit. Capnellene is the presumed biosynthetic precursor to the capnellanols, a group of alcohols based on the capnellene skeleton that are also produced by Capnella imbricata, however the biosynthesis of these compounds has not yet been elucidated.

== History ==
The capnellane group became a focal point for synthesis in the 1970s and 80's. Scientists believed that these compounds had antimicrobial properties, based on an earlier discovery of antimicrobial activity in gorgonian soft corals and a later study of antimicrobial terpenoid compounds in alcyonarians. It was also postulated that capnellenes also protect the soft coral by preventing larval settlement.

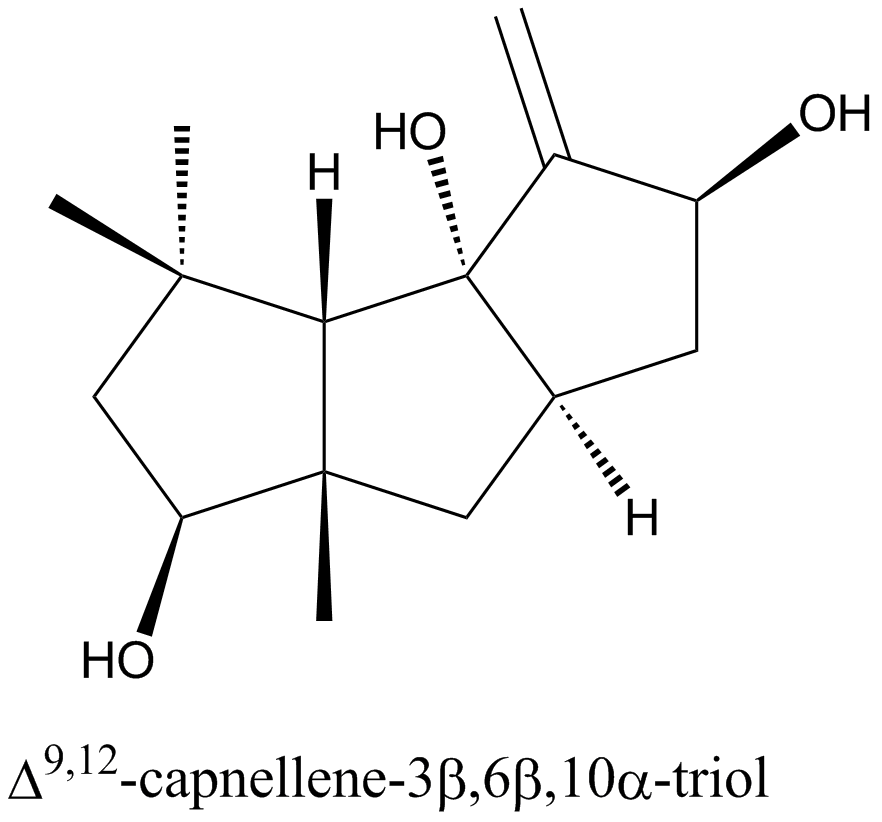

Capnella imbricata is a rich source of many non-isoprenoid sesquiterpenes, which all share the cis,anti,cis-tricyclo[6.3.0.0^{2,6}]undecane ring system. Consequently, the first known isolation of a capnellane derivative was not capnellene but a capnellanol. As part of an ongoing search for terpenoids from marine sources, Kaisin et al. (1974) characterized the most abundant terpenoid, Δ^{9(12)}-capnellene-3β,8β,10α-triol, from colonies of Capnella imbricata. The structure and absolute configuration of the triol were determined by nuclear magnetic resonance (NMR) spectroscopy and later confirmed by x-ray crystallography.

Kaisin et al. (1974) coined the name “capnellane” for the hydrocarbon skeleton on which the molecule was based. However, Shiekh et al. (1976) also claim to have originated the name. The first isolation of the hydrocarbon form, Δ9^{(12)}-capnellene, was achieved in 1978. Since then, numerous groups have isolated both Δ^{9(12)}-capnellene and its alcohol derivatives.

== Natural isolation ==
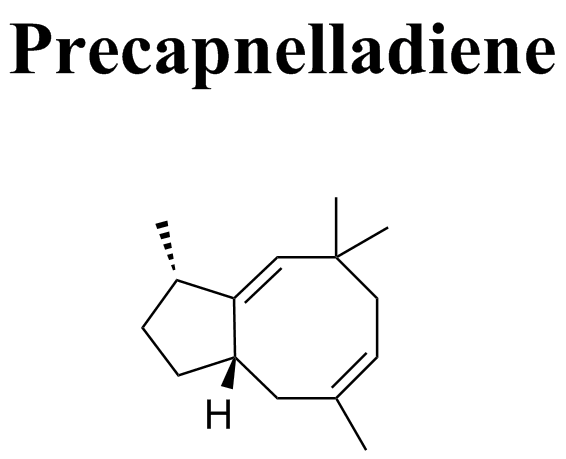

Naturally occurring alcohol derivatives of capnellene have been isolated using simple acetone extraction from Capnella imbricata, a species of soft coral (family Octocorallia) known as Kenya Tree Coral. Capnella is a widely distributed genus of soft coral, found primarily in the tropical reefs of Indonesia. These corals produce a variety of sterols, sesquiterpenes and diterpenes. Specifically, the capnellanol derivatives found in Capnella serve as a defense system by inhibiting the growth of microorganisms and the settlement of larvae on the coral's surface. However, the details of this defense mechanism have not been extensively explored. Although the natural synthesis of capnellene and its derivatives is not yet understood, the sesquiterpene hydrocarbon precapnelladiene has been isolated from the same coral and research suggests that may be a biogenetic precursor.

== Total synthesis ==
Capnellene has been a popular target for synthesis due to its molecular architecture, its role in the defense mechanism of soft corals, and the challenge posed by the high degree of stereochemical sophistication and the complexity of the undecane skeleton. In 1981, the first stereocontrolled synthesis of (±)-Δ^{9(12)}-capnellene was performed in nine steps, with an overall yield of 60%. Their starting reagent was a dimethylated cyclopentenyl carboxaldehyde and the overall synthesis took the form of a series of pentane ring annulations. The second pentane ring was formed by condensation of the aldehyde by vinylmagnesium bromide, followed by Nazarov cyclization of the dienone. A regiospecific [3+2] cyclopentannulation, using ozonolysis and an intramolecular aldol condensation, formed the third ring and a simple dehydration reaction yielded the target capnellene.

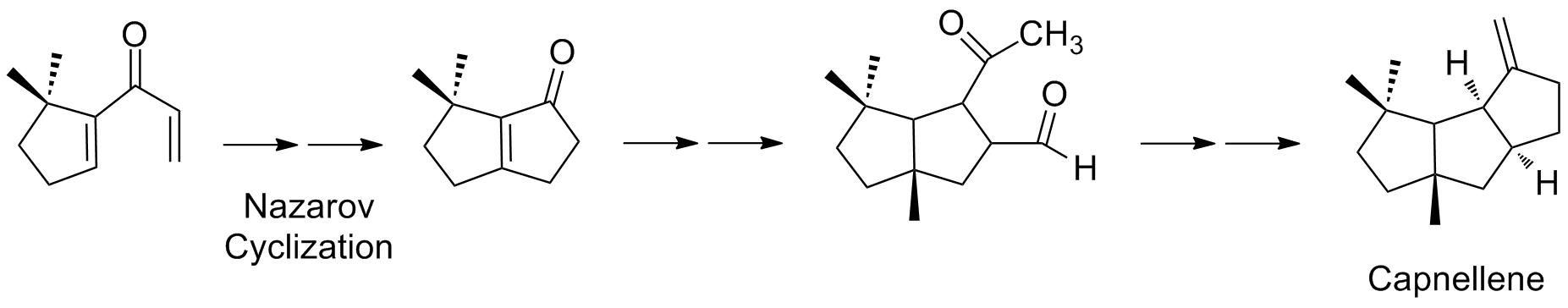

Since the first synthesis, many investigators have successfully assembled capnellene and its derivatives. Approaches to this synthesis are diverse, and include central steps such as annululation, olefin metathesis, radical cyclization, and trapping reactions. The most heavily cited synthesis in the literature involves two key intermediates formed by a Stille reaction, the palladium-catalyzed coupling of vinyl triflate with vinyl stannane. The readily prepared trimethylcyclopentanone can be converted into vinyl triflate, which is coupled with vinylstannane in the first palladium-catalyzed step to yield the desired divinyl ketone. The second 5-membered ring is formed via Nazarov cyclization, and the product is prepared for a second palladium-catalyzed coupling. This step yields another divinyl ketone, which can be cyclized to an enone, hydrated, and converted to an alkene via olefination to yield capnellene.

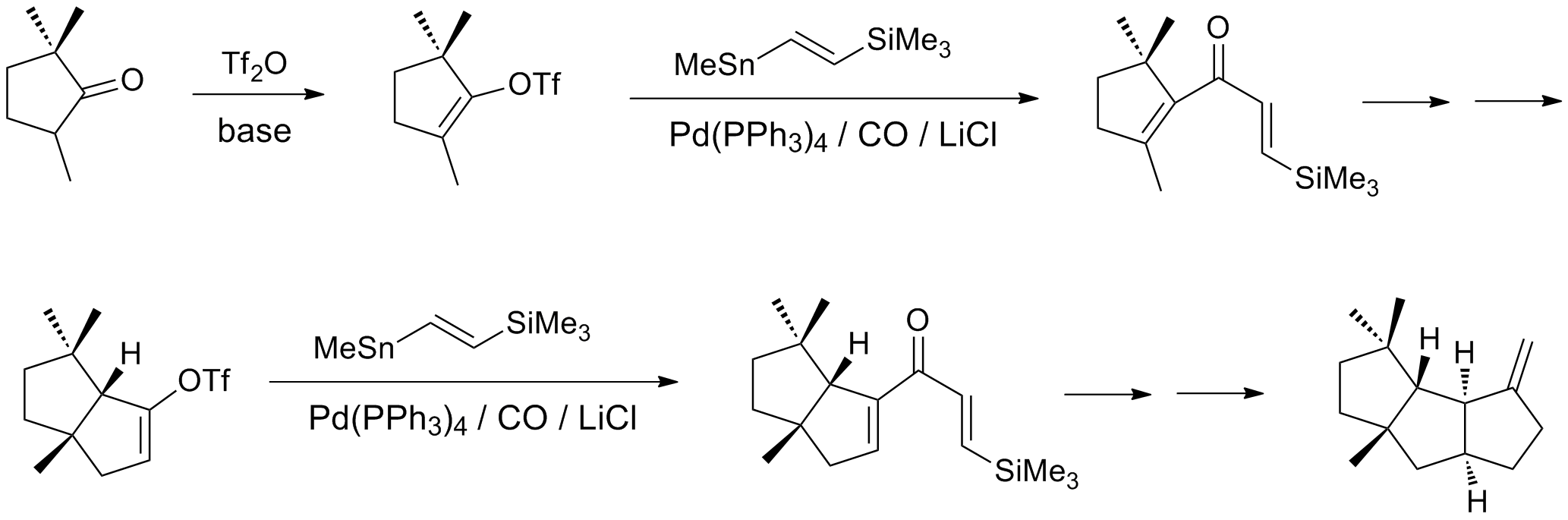

== Applications ==
Since the 1960s, marine organisms with robust chemical defense systems have been targeted for “molecular mining,” a method of drug discovery that probes organisms of interest for useful compounds. Chemical agents involved in the defense systems of these organisms often exhibit antibacterial, anti-inflammatory, and chemotherapeutic properties. Capnellene derivatives and their terrestrial counterparts, hirsutanes, demonstrate antibacterial and antitumor properties with pharmacological potential.

=== Antitumor properties ===
Capnellene-8β,10α-diol and its acylated derivatives exhibit significant cytotoxicity in vitro against cervical epitheloid carcinoma (HeLa, oral epidermoid (KB), medulloblastoma (Daoy) and colon adenocarcinoma (WiDr) human tumor cell lines. The diol was also effective against human leukemia, renal leiomyoblastoma, colon and breast cancer cell lines. In the same study, capnellene-8β-ol demonstrated selective toxicity for the renal leiomyoblastoma and ovarian cancer cell lines, while 3β-acetoxycapnellene-8β,10α,14β-triol was active against leukemia cell lines. The antitumor properties of capnellene derivatives have yet to be explored in vivo.

=== Anti-inflammatory properties ===
Capnellene derivatives have recently been identified as possible treatments for neuropathic pain. Neuropathic pain is characterized by damage to peripheral or central nerves that results in pathological nociceptive transmission, the neuronal process that responds noxious stimuli. Two capnellene derivatives Δ^{9,12}-capnellene-8β,10α-diol and 8α-acetoxy-Δ^{9,12}-capnellene-10α-ol demonstrate potential as analgesics capable of attenuating neuropathic pain. These compounds have been shown in vivo to reduce two proteins that mediate inflammation, cyclooxygenase-2 (COX-2) and inducible nitric oxide synthase (iNOS). In vivo, Δ^{9,12}-capnellene-8β,10α-diol inhibited hyperalgesia behavior in the mouse model for neuropathic pain in a dose-dependent manner. Additionally, treatment with Δ^{9,12}-capnellene-8β,10α-diol inhibited the up-regulation of immunoreactivity in the mouse model, specifically targeting the production of COX-2. Unlike many non-steroidal anti-inflammatory drugs, Δ^{9,12}-capnellene-8β,10α-diol is advantageous in its selectivity for the COX isoenzyme COX-2, avoiding many of the gastrointestinal side effects associated with the inhibition of COX-1. This fact would allow for the administration of Δ^{9,12}-capnellene-8β,10α-diol in higher doses, potentially offering significant relief from neuropathic pain.

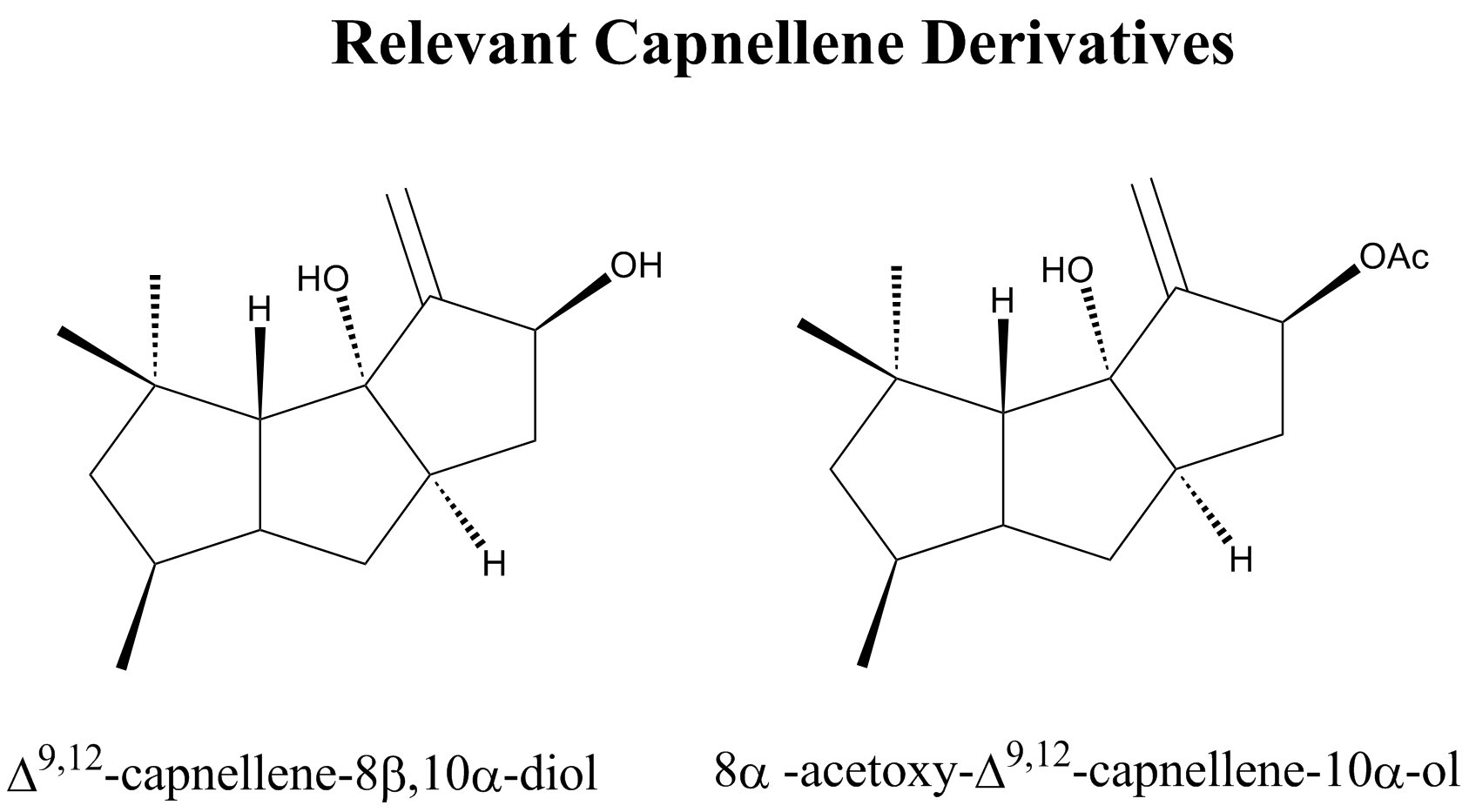
