= 1-Hexadecene =

Names
- Preferred IUPAC name Hexadec-1-ene
- Other names 1-Hexadecene; Cetene; 1-Cetene; Hexadecylene-1

Identifiers
CAS Number	629-73-2
3D model (JSmol)	Interactive image
ChEBI	CHEBI:77507
ChEMBL	ChEMBL3182381
ChemSpider	11889
ECHA InfoCard	100.010.097
EC Number	211-105-8
PubChem CID	12395
UNII	97T015M2UX
CompTox Dashboard (EPA)	DTXSID1027269
- InChI: InChI=1S/C16H32/c1-3-5-7-9-11-13-15-16-14-12-10-8-6-4-2/h3H,1,4-16H2,2H3 Key: GQEZCXVZFLOKMC-UHFFFAOYSA-N
- SMILES: CCCCCCCCCCCCCCC=C

Properties
Chemical formula	C_{16}H_{32}
Molar mass	224.432 g·mol^{−1}
Appearance	Colorless liquid
Density	0.781 g/cm^{3}
Melting point	4 °C (39 °F; 277 K)
Boiling point	285 °C (545 °F; 558 K)

Hazards
- GHS labelling
Pictograms	(GHS08: Health hazard) (GHS09: Environmental hazard)
Signal word	Danger
Hazard statements	H304, H410
Precautionary statements	P273, P301+P316, P331, P391, P405, P501
Flash point	132 °C (270 °F; 405 K)
Autoignition temperature	240 °C (464 °F; 513 K)
- Except where otherwise noted, data are given for materials in their standard state (at 25 °C [77 °F], 100 kPa). Infobox references

1-Hexadecene, also known as 1-cetene, is a long-chain hydrocarbon and an alkene with the molecular formula CH_{2}=CH(CH_{2})_{13}CH_{3}. It is one of many isomers of hexadecene. Classified as an alpha-olefin, 1-hexadecene is a colorless liquid.

== Uses ==
1-Hexadecene is used as a surfactant in lubricating fluid, a drilling fluid in the boring and drilling industry, and in paper sizing. It is used to functionalize hydrogen-terminated silicon surfaces by hydrosilation.

However, the high reactivity of 1-hexadecene means that exposure to air could cause oxidation of its surface layer, forming unwanted impurities. It is stored with the use of tank blanketing, and handled in a dry, inert atmosphere.
