= Dodecylbenzene =

1-Dodecylbenzene
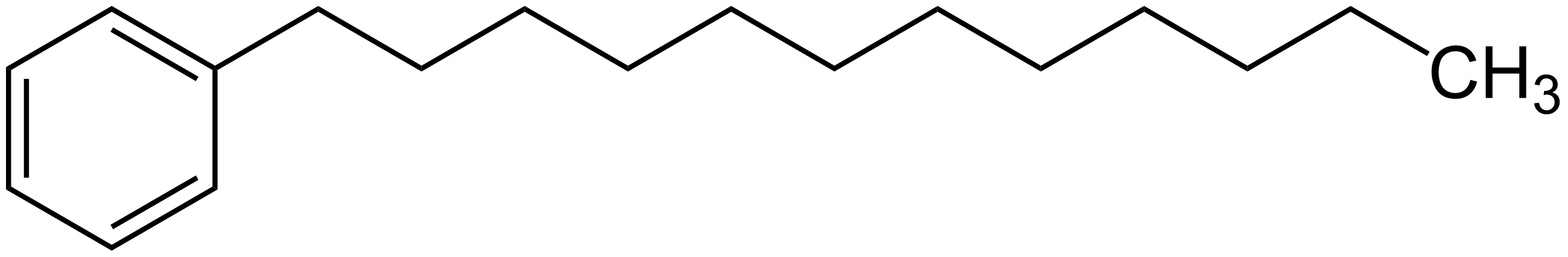

Names
- Preferred IUPAC name Dodecylbenzene
- Other names 1-Phenyldodecane, Phenyldodecane, n-Dodecylbenzene, Laurylbenzene

Identifiers
CAS Number	29986-57-0; 123-01-3
3D model (JSmol)	Interactive image
Abbreviations	PhDo; DoPh
Beilstein Reference	1909107
ChemSpider	28977
ECHA InfoCard	100.004.175
EC Number	204-591-8
PubChem CID	31237
RTECS number	CZ9540000
UNII	A2AX003680
CompTox Dashboard (EPA)	DTXSID7026994
- InChI: InChI=1S/C18H30/c1-2-3-4-5-6-7-8-9-10-12-15-18-16-13-11-14-17-18/h11,13-14,16-17H,2-10,12,15H2,1H3 Key: KWKXNDCHNDYVRT-UHFFFAOYSA-N; InChI=1/C18H30/c1-2-3-4-5-6-7-8-9-10-12-15-18-16-13-11-14-17-18/h11,13-14,16-17H,2-10,12,15H2,1H3 Key: KWKXNDCHNDYVRT-UHFFFAOYAI
- SMILES: c1ccccc1CCCCCCCCCCCC

Properties
Chemical formula	C_{18}H_{30}
Molar mass	246.438 g·mol^{−1}
Appearance	colourless liquid
Density	0.856 g·cm^{−3}
Melting point	3 °C (37 °F; 276 K)
Boiling point	328 °C (622 °F; 601 K)
Solubility in water	insoluble

Hazards
- GHS labelling
Pictograms	(GHS07: Exclamation mark) (GHS09: Environmental hazard)
Signal word	Warning
Hazard statements	H315, H410, H413
Precautionary statements	P264, P273, P280, P302+P352, P321, P332+P313, P362, P391, P501
NFPA 704 (fire diamond)	1 1 0
Flash point	135 °C (275 °F; 408 K)
Safety data sheet (SDS)	https://www.sigmaaldrich.com/US/en/sds/aldrich/113239
- Except where otherwise noted, data are given for materials in their standard state (at 25 °C [77 °F], 100 kPa). verify (what is ?) Infobox references

Dodecylbenzene is an organic compound with the molecular formula C_{18}H_{30} (structurally C_{12}H_{25}C_{6}H_{5}). Dodecylbenzene is a colorless liquid with a weak odor and floats on water.

Dodecylbenzene is a linear alkylbenzene consisting of a dodecyl group (C_{12}H_{25}−) attached to a phenyl group (−C_{6}H_{5}). Dodecylbenzene is a precursor to sodium dodecylbenzenesulfonate, a surfactant that is a key ingredient of household laundry detergents, such as detergent powder.

== Production ==
This compound and some related linear alkylbenzenes are produced industrially by alkylation of benzene with the corresponding terminal alkenes in the presence of hydrogen fluoride, aluminium trichloride, or related acids used as the catalyst:

R−CH=CH_{2} + C_{6}H_{6} → R−CH_{2}−CH_{2}−C_{6}H_{5}

The resulting linear alkylbenzene compounds are sulfonated on the benzene ring to give the corresponding sulfonic acids. The sulfonation for dodecylbenzene:

C_{12}H_{25}C_{6}H_{5} + SO_{3} → C_{12}H_{25}C_{6}H_{4}SO_{3}H

This sulfonation can be highly specific to place the sulfonic acid group across the ring, in the 4-position (para to the alkyl group). The resulting sulfonic acid is then neutralized with base to give the corresponding linear alkylbenzenesulfonate salt. The dodecylbenzenesulfonic acid reaction with the base sodium hydroxide:

C_{12}H_{25}C_{6}H_{4}SO_{3}H + OH^{−} → C_{12}H_{25}C_{6}H_{4}SO_{3}^{−} + H_{2}O

Subsequently, the finished product is blended with other components for the manufacturing of cleaning products.

Dodecylbenzene (and its isomers) are precursors to linear alkylbenzene sulfonate detergents.
