= Shell higher olefin process =

Chemical production of α-olefins

The Shell higher olefin process (SHOP) is a chemical process for the production of linear alpha olefins via ethylene oligomerization and olefin metathesis invented and exploited by Shell plc. The olefin products are converted to fatty aldehydes and then to fatty alcohols, which are precursors to plasticizers and detergents. The annual global production of olefins through this method is over one million tonnes.

== History ==
The process was discovered by chemists at Shell Development Emeryville in 1968. At the time ecological considerations demanded the replacement of branched fatty alcohols used widely in detergents by linear fatty alcohols because the biodegradation of the branched compounds was slow, causing foaming of surface water. At the same time new gas oil crackers were being commissioned and ethylene supply was outpacing demand.

The process was commercialized in 1977 by Shell plc and following an expansion of the Geismar, Louisiana (USA) plant in 2002 global annual production capacity was 1.2 million tons.

== Process ==
Ethylene reacts by the catalyst to give longer chains. Unlike the Ziegler–Natta process, which aims to produce very long polymers, the oligomer stops growing after addition of 1–10 repeating units of ethylene. The fraction containing C_{12} to C_{18} olefins (40–50%) has direct commercial value in detergent production and is removed. For the remaining fraction to be of commercial interest two additional steps are required. The first step is liquid-phase isomerization using alkaline alumina catalyst leading to internal double bonds. For example, 1-octene is converted to 4-octene and 1-eicocene (a C20 hydrocarbon) is converted to 10-eicocene. In the second step olefin metathesis converts mixtures like these to 2-tetradecene which is a C14 component and again within commercial range.

The internal olefins can also be reacted with an excess of ethylene with rhenium(VII) oxide supported on alumina as catalyst in an ethenolysis reaction, which causes the internal double bond to break up to form a mixture of α-olefins with odd and even carbon chain-length of the desired molecular weight.

The C_{12} to C_{18} olefins subsequently are subjected to hydroformylation (oxo process) to give aldehydes. The aldehyde is hydrogenated to give fatty alcohols, which are suitable for manufacturing detergents.

== Catalytic cycle ==
The first step in this process is the ethylene oligomerization to a mixture of even-numbered α-olefins at 80 to 120 °C and 70 to 140 bar (7 to 14 MPa) catalyzed by a nickel-phosphine complex. Such catalysts are typically prepared from diarylphosphino carboxylic acids, such as (C_{6}H_{5})_{2}PCH_{2}CO_{2}H. The process and its mechanism was elucidated by the group of Wilhelm Keim, first at Shell and later at the RWTH Aachen.

== Alternative routes ==
In another olefin application of Shell cyclododecatriene is partially hydrogenated to cyclododecene and then subjected to ethenolysis to the terminal linear open-chain diene. The process was still in use at Essar Stanlow refinery until a serious explosion and following fire lead to the closure of the plant and the alcohols units it fed in 2018.

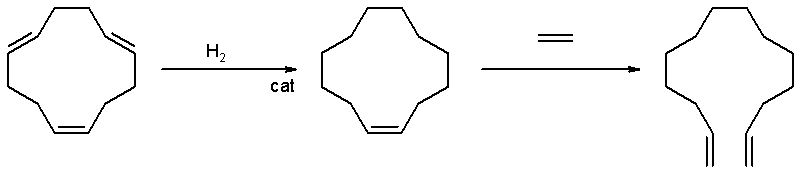
