= Alkylbenzene sulfonate =

Class of chemical compounds

The general structure of sodium dodecylbenzenesulfonates, prominent examples of alkylbenzene sulfonates

Alkylbenzene sulfonates are a class of anionic surfactants, consisting of a hydrophilic sulfonate head-group and a hydrophobic alkylbenzene tail-group. Along with sodium laureth sulfate, they are one of the oldest and most widely used synthetic detergents and may be found in numerous personal-care products (soaps, shampoos, toothpaste etc.) and household-care products (laundry detergent, dishwashing liquid, spray cleaner etc.). They were introduced in the 1930s in the form of branched alkylbenzene sulfonates (BAS). However following environmental concerns these were replaced with linear alkylbenzene sulfonates (LAS) during the 1960s. Since then production has increased significantly from about one million tons in 1980, to around 3.5 million tons in 2016, making them most produced anionic surfactant after soaps.

== Branched alkylbenzene sulfonates ==
An example of a branched alkylbenzene sulfonate (BAS)

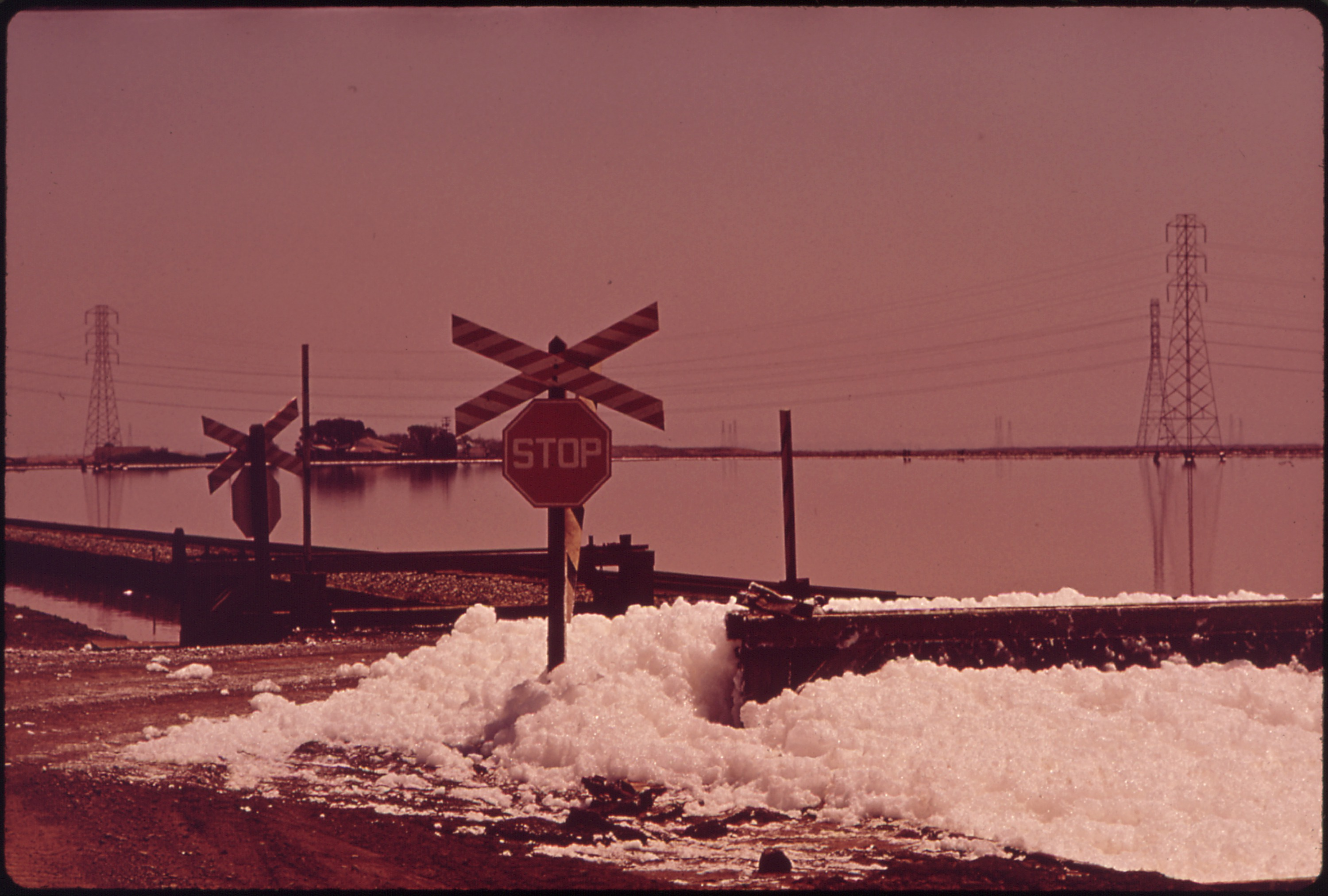
Extensive foaming Fremont, California - 1972

Branched alkylbenzene sulfonates (BAS) were introduced in the early 1930s and saw significant growth from the late 1940s onwards, in early literature these synthetic detergents are often abbreviated as syndets. They were prepared by the Friedel–Crafts alkylation of benzene with 'propylene tetramer' (also called tetrapropylene) followed by sulfonation. Propylene tetramer being a broad term for a mixture of compounds formed by the oligomerization of propene, its use gave a mixture of highly branched structures.

Compared to traditional soaps, BAS offered superior tolerance to hard water and better foaming. However, the highly branched tail made it difficult to biodegrade. BAS was widely blamed for the formation of large expanses of stable foam in areas of wastewater discharge such as lakes, rivers and coastal areas (sea foams), as well as foaming problems encountered in sewage treatment and contamination of drinking water. As such, BAS was phased out of most detergent products during the 1960s, being replaced with linear alkylbenzene sulfonates (LAS), which biodegrade much more rapidly. BAS is still important in certain agrochemical and industrial applications, where rapid biodegradability is of reduced importance. For instance, inhibiting asphaltene deposition from crude oil.

== Linear alkylbenzene sulfonates ==
An example of a linear alkylbenzene sulfonate (LAS)

Linear alkylbenzene sulfonates (LAS) are prepared industrially by the sulfonation of linear alkylbenzenes (LABs), which can themselves be prepared in several ways. In the most common route benzene is alkylated by long chain monoalkenes (e.g. dodecene) using hydrogen fluoride as a catalyst. The purified dodecylbenzenes (and related derivatives) are then sulfonated with sulfur trioxide to give the sulfonic acid. The sulfonic acid is subsequently neutralized with sodium hydroxide. The term "linear" refers to the starting alkenes rather than the final product, perfectly linear addition products are not seen, in-line with Markovnikov's rule. Thus, the alkylation of linear alkenes, even 1-alkenes such as 1-dodecene, gives several isomers of phenyldodecane.

== Structure property relationships ==
Under ideal conditions the cleaning power of BAS and LAS is very similar, however LAS performs slightly better in normal use conditions, due to it being less affected by hard water. Within LAS itself the detergency of the various isomers are fairly similar, however their physical properties (Krafft point, foaming etc.) are noticeably different. In particular the Krafft point of the high 2-phenyl product (i.e. the least branched isomer) remains below 0 °C up to 25% LAS whereas the low 2-phenyl cloud point is ~15 °C. This behavior is often exploited by producers to create either clear or cloudy products.

== Environmental fate ==
The biodegradability of alkylbenzene sulfonates has been well studied. Branching or lack thereof ("linear") for the alkyl side chain is decisive. The salt of the linear material has an LD_{50} of 2.3 mg/liter for fish, about four times more toxic than the branched compound; however the linear compound biodegrades far more quickly, making it the safer choice over time. It is biodegraded rapidly under aerobic conditions with a half-life of approximately 1–3 weeks; oxidative degradation initiates at the alkyl chain. Under anaerobic conditions it degrades very slowly or not at all, causing it to exist in high concentrations in sewage sludge, but this is not thought to be a cause for concern as it will rapidly degrade once returned to an oxygenated environment.
