= Decadienoic acid =

Decadienoic acid is any mono-carboxylic acid with an unbranched chain of ten carbon atoms, connected by seven single bonds and two double bonds. That is, any compound with formula HO(O=)C–(CH_{2})_{x}–CH=CH–(CH_{2})_{y}–CH=CH–(–CH_{2})_{z}–H where x, y, and z can be zero or more, and x+y+z = 5 (72 isomers); or HO(O=)C–(CH_{2})_{r}–CH=C=CH–(CH_{2})_{s}–H where r + s = 6 (15 isomers). All these compounds have the formula C_{10}H_{16}O_{2}. A salt or ester of such an acid is called a decadienoate.

These compounds are unsaturated fatty acids, although they are rarely found in natural lipids (fats, waxes, phospholipids, etc.).

== Isomers ==
=== Positional isomerism ===
The various decadienoic acid isomers can be distinguished by the positions of their double bonds along the chain. A double bond is said to be at position k if it connects carbons k and k+1 of the chain, counting from 1 at the carboxyl end. The positions are x+2 and x+y+4 for the first type (21 possibilities), and r+2 and r+3 for the second type (7 possibilities). The systematic name of the acid is formed by prefixing the positions of the double bonds to "decadienoic" or inserting them before the "dienoic" suffix. as in "4,7-decadienoic" or "dec-4,7-dienoic" for HO(O=)C–(–CH_{2})_{2}–CH=CH–CH_{2}–CH=CH–(CH_{2})_{2}–H.

=== Geometric isomerism ===
Decadienoic acids with the two double bonds in the same positions can be further distinguished by the geometry of the adjacent single bonds.

Each double bond that is adjacent to two single C–C bonds can be in two cis-trans conformations, namely with those two single bonds on the same side (cis or Z) or opposite sides (trans or E) of the double bond's plane.

If the two double bonds overlap forming an allene core C=C=C surrounded by two single C–C bonds, the chain fragments C–C=C=C and C=C=C–C will lie on perpendicular planes. Then, instead of cis-trans isomers, there will be two axial isomers distinguished by the handedness of the C–C=C=C–C "screw". They are denoted by the letters R and S.

Double bonds at the very end of the chain (–C=CH_{2} or -C=C=CH_{2}) will not cause geometric isomerism, because the two hydrogen atoms in the final carbon are symmetrically placed relative to the bond's plane. However, geometric isomerism may still occur at that position in derivative compounds where one or both terminal hydrogens are replaced by different groups.

Geometric isomerism raises the number of decadienoic acids with separate double bonds from 21 to 72, and of those with an allene core from 6 to 11.

=== Examples ===
Docadienoic acids that have received some attention include:

- trans-2-cis-4-decadienoic acid, (2E,4Z) deca-2,4-dienoic acid (CAS 30361-33-2, Nikkaji J88.660B). It is about 8% of the fatty acids (per mole) of stillingia oil. The methyl ester is a flavoring agent (FEMA The propyl ester (CAS 3025-32-9, Nikkaji J309.441C, FDA D07SW1IHHP) is present in some extracts.
- deca-(2E,4Z)-dienoic acid (CAS 544-48-9) The propyl ester (CAS 28316-62-3, FDA 2EEE2O3TE8) is a flavoring agent. The butyl ester (CAS 28369-24-6) is a flavor/fragrance agent. The ethyl ester (CAS 3025-30-7, Beilstein 1724176) is source of aroma of Bartlett pears; also present in fresh apple, Vitis sp., quince and Strychnos madagascariensis
- deca-(2Z,4E)-dienoic acid (CAS 68676-77-7, Nikkaji J703.053C).
- deca-(2Z,4Z)-dienoic acid. Propyl ester (CAS ??)
- deca-4,8-dienoic acid (CAS 13159-49-4) Unspecified isomers present in some flavor extracts.

==== Derivatives ====
Some derivatives of interest are:

== See also ==
- Decanoic acid, fully saturated, C_{10}H_{20}O2
- Decenoic acid, mono-unsaturated, C_{10}H_{18}O2
