= C18H36 =

The molecular formula C_{18}H_{36} (molar mass: 252.48 g/mol, exact mass: 252.2817 u) may refer to:

- Octadecene
- Tetra-tert-butylethylene
