= 1-Hexene (data page) =

Chemical data page

This page provides supplementary chemical data on 1-Hexene.

== Material Safety Data Sheet ==
The handling of this chemical may incur notable safety precautions. It is highly recommended that you seek the Material Safety Datasheet (MSDS) for this chemical from a reliable source such as SIRI, and follow its directions.

MSDS

== Thermodynamic properties ==
Phase behavior
Triple point	133.39 K (−139.76 °C), ? Pa
Gas properties
Std enthalpy change of formation, Δ_{f}H^{~~o~~}_{gas}	−43.5 kJ/mol

== Spectral data ==
This box:
- Except where noted otherwise, data relate to Standard temperature and pressure.
- Reliability of data general note.
