= 1-Octadecene =

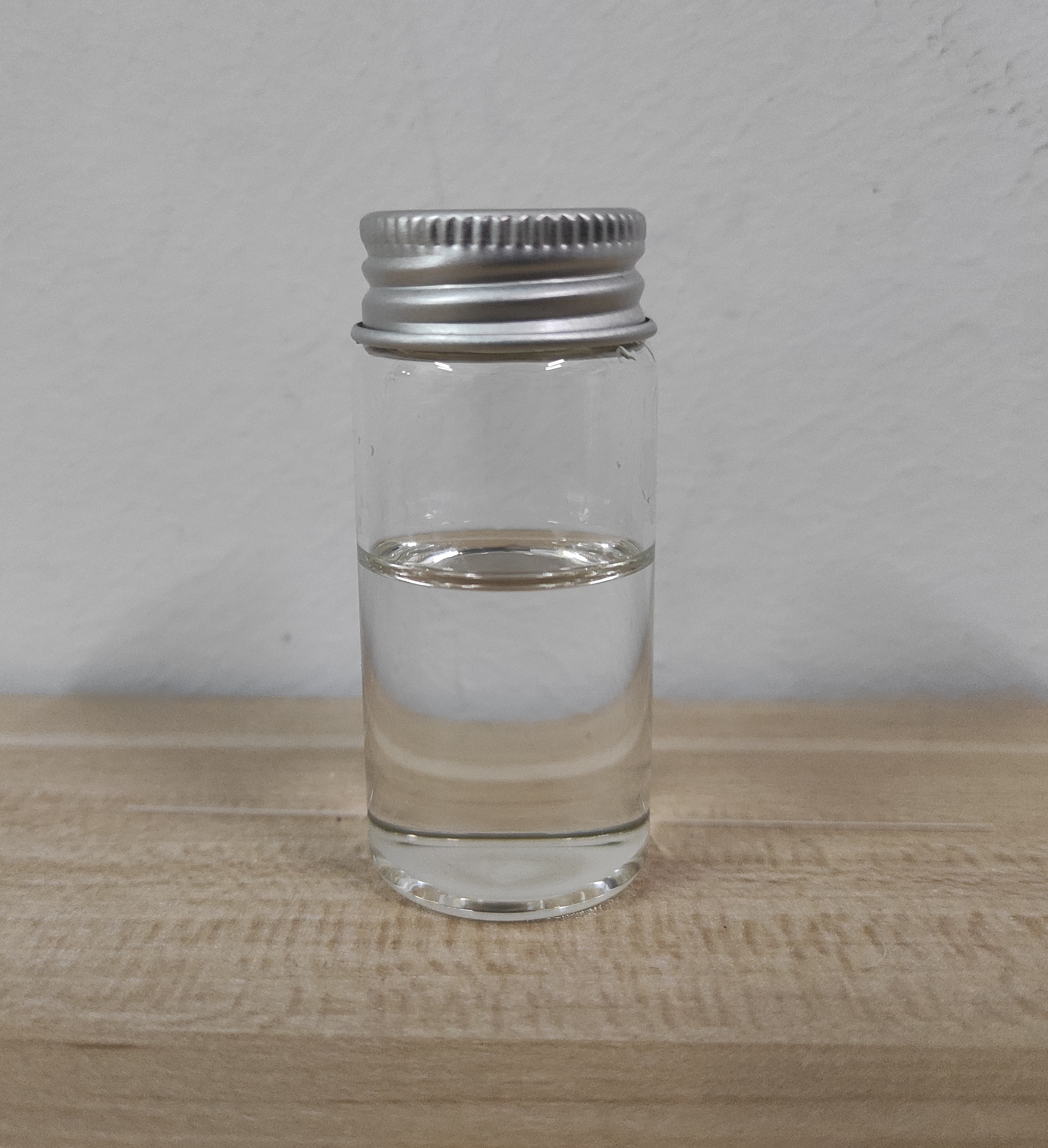

Names
- Preferred IUPAC name Octadec-1-ene
- Other names alpha-Octadecene; Octadecylene; alpha-Olefin C18; n-1-Octadecene

Identifiers
CAS Number	112-88-9
3D model (JSmol)	Interactive image
ChEBI	CHEBI:30824
ChemSpider	7925
ECHA InfoCard	100.003.648
PubChem CID	8217
UNII	H5ZUQ6V4AK
CompTox Dashboard (EPA)	DTXSID3026932
- InChI: InChI=1S/C18H36/c1-3-5-7-9-11-13-15-17-18-16-14-12-10-8-6-4-2/h3H,1,4-18H2,2H3 Key: CCCMONHAUSKTEQ-UHFFFAOYSA-N; InChI=1S/C18H36/c1-3-5-7-9-11-13-15-17-18-16-14-12-10-8-6-4-2/h3H,1,4-18H2,2H3; Key: CCCMONHAUSKTEQ-UHFFFAOYSA-N
- SMILES: C=C\CCCCCCCCCCCCCCCC

Properties
Chemical formula	C_{18}H_{36}
Molar mass	252.486 g·mol^{−1}
Appearance	colorless liquid
Density	0.789 g/mL
Melting point	14 to 16 °C (57 to 61 °F; 287 to 289 K); 17 to 18 °C
Boiling point	315 °C (599 °F; 588 K)
Solubility in water	Insoluble

Hazards
NFPA 704 (fire diamond)	1 1 0
Flash point	155 °C (311 °F; 428 K)
Autoignition temperature	250 °C (482 °F; 523 K)
- Except where otherwise noted, data are given for materials in their standard state (at 25 °C [77 °F], 100 kPa). verify (what is ?) Infobox references

1-Octadecene is a long-chain hydrocarbon and an alkene with the molecular formula CH_{2}=CH(CH_{2})_{15}CH_{3}. It is one of many isomers of octadecene. Classified as an alpha-olefin, 1-octadecene is the longest alkene that is liquid at room temperature.

== Hydrosilation ==
Treatment of 1-octadecene with trichlorosilane in the presence of platinum catalysts gives octadecyltrichlorosilane. Octadecene adds to hydrogen-terminated bulk silicon.

== See also ==
- C_{18}H_{36}
