= Tetra-tert-butylethylene =

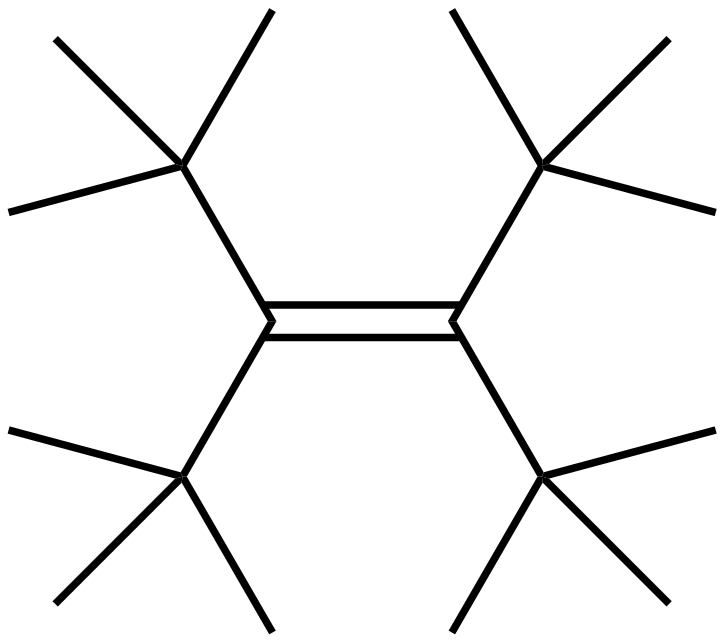
- Skeletal formula of tetra-tert-butylethylene

Names
- Preferred IUPAC name 3,4-Di-tert-butyl-2,2,5,5-tetramethylhex-3-ene

Identifiers
CAS Number	75245-23-7
3D model (JSmol)	Interactive image
ChemSpider	19627020
PubChem CID	13179773
CompTox Dashboard (EPA)	DTXSID70525078
- InChI: InChI=1S/C18H36/c1-15(2,3)13(16(4,5)6)14(17(7,8)9)18(10,11)12/h1-12H3 Key: WXTSAYDLWHISDR-UHFFFAOYSA-N
- SMILES: CC(C)(C)C(=C(C(C)(C)C)C(C)(C)C)C(C)(C)C

Properties
Chemical formula	C_{18}H_{36}
Molar mass	252.486 g·mol^{−1}
- Except where otherwise noted, data are given for materials in their standard state (at 25 °C [77 °F], 100 kPa). verify (what is ?) Infobox references

Tetra-tert-butylethylene is a hypothetical organic compound, a hydrocarbon with formula C_{18}H_{36}, or ((H_{3}C−)_{3}C−)_{2}C=C(−C(−CH_{3})_{3})_{2}. As the name indicates, its molecular structure can be viewed as an ethylene molecule H_{2}C=CH_{2} with the four hydrogens replaced by tert-butyl −C(−CH_{3})_{3} groups.

As of 2006, this compound had not yet been synthesized, in spite of many efforts. It is of interest in chemical research as an alkene whose double bond is strained but protected by steric hindrance. Theoretical studies indicate that the molecule should be stable, with a strain energy of about 93 kcal/mol (390 kJ/mol).

== See also ==
- Tetra-tert-butylmethane, C_{17}H_{36}, another "impossible" hydrocarbon
- C_{18}H_{36}
