= 1,5-Hexadiene =

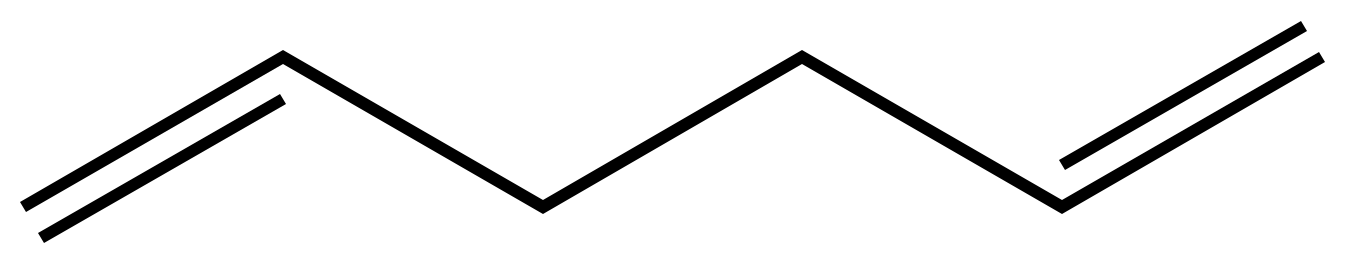

Names
- Preferred IUPAC name Hexa-1,5-diene
- Other names diallyl, biallyl, α,ω-Hexadiene

Identifiers
CAS Number	592-42-7
3D model (JSmol)	Interactive image
ChemSpider	11110
ECHA InfoCard	100.008.869
EC Number	209-754-7
PubChem CID	11598
UNII	4MTZ4764FI
CompTox Dashboard (EPA)	DTXSID4049323
- InChI: InChI=1S/C6H10/c1-3-5-6-4-2/h3-4H,1-2,5-6H2 Key: PYGSKMBEVAICCR-UHFFFAOYSA-N
- SMILES: C=CCCC=C

Properties
Chemical formula	C_{6}H_{10}
Molar mass	82.146 g·mol^{−1}
Appearance	colorless liquid
Boiling point	59–60 °C (138–140 °F; 332–333 K)

Hazards
- GHS labelling
Pictograms	(GHS02: Flammable) (GHS07: Exclamation mark) (GHS08: Health hazard)
Signal word	Danger
Hazard statements	H225, H302, H305, H315, H319, H335, H336
Precautionary statements	P210, P233, P240, P241, P242, P243, P261, P264, P271, P280, P301+P310, P302+P352, P303+P361+P353, P304+P340, P305+P351+P338, P312, P321, P331, P332+P313, P337+P313, P362, P370+P378, P403+P233, P403+P235, P405, P501
- Except where otherwise noted, data are given for materials in their standard state (at 25 °C [77 °F], 100 kPa). Infobox references

1,5-Hexadiene is the organic compound with the formula (CH_{2})_{2}(CH=CH_{2})_{2}. It is a colorless, volatile liquid. It is used as a crosslinking agent and precursor to a variety of other compounds.

== Synthesis ==
1,5-Hexadiene is produced commercially by the ethenolysis of 1,5-cyclooctadiene:

(CH_{2}CH=CHCH_{2})_{2} + 2 CH_{2}=CH_{2} → 2 (CH_{2})_{2}CH=CH_{2}

The catalyst is derived from Re_{2}O_{7} on alumina.

A laboratory-scale preparation involves reductive coupling of allyl chloride using magnesium:

2 ClCH_{2}CH=CH_{2} + Mg → (CH_{2}CH=CH_{2})_{2} + MgCl_{2}
