= Octene =

Alkene (C8H16)

1-octene

Octene is an alkene with the formula C_{8}H_{16}. Several isomers of octene are known, depending on the position and the geometry of the double bond in the carbon chain.

The simplest isomer is 1-octene, an alpha-olefin used primarily as a co-monomer in production of polyethylene via the solution polymerization process. Several useful structural isomers of the octenes are obtained by dimerization of isobutene and 1-butene. These branched alkenes are used to alkylate phenols to give precursors to detergents. The dimerisation of isobutane generates diisobutenes
