= Molybdenum oxide =

Molybdenum oxide may refer to:

- Molybdenum(IV) oxide (molybdenum dioxide, MoO_{2})
- Molybdenum(VI) oxide (molybdenum trioxide, MoO_{3})

Other stoichiometric binary molybdenum-oxygen compounds include Mo_{8}O_{23} and Mo_{17}O_{47}.
