= 1-Hexene =

- Structural formula of 1-Hexene

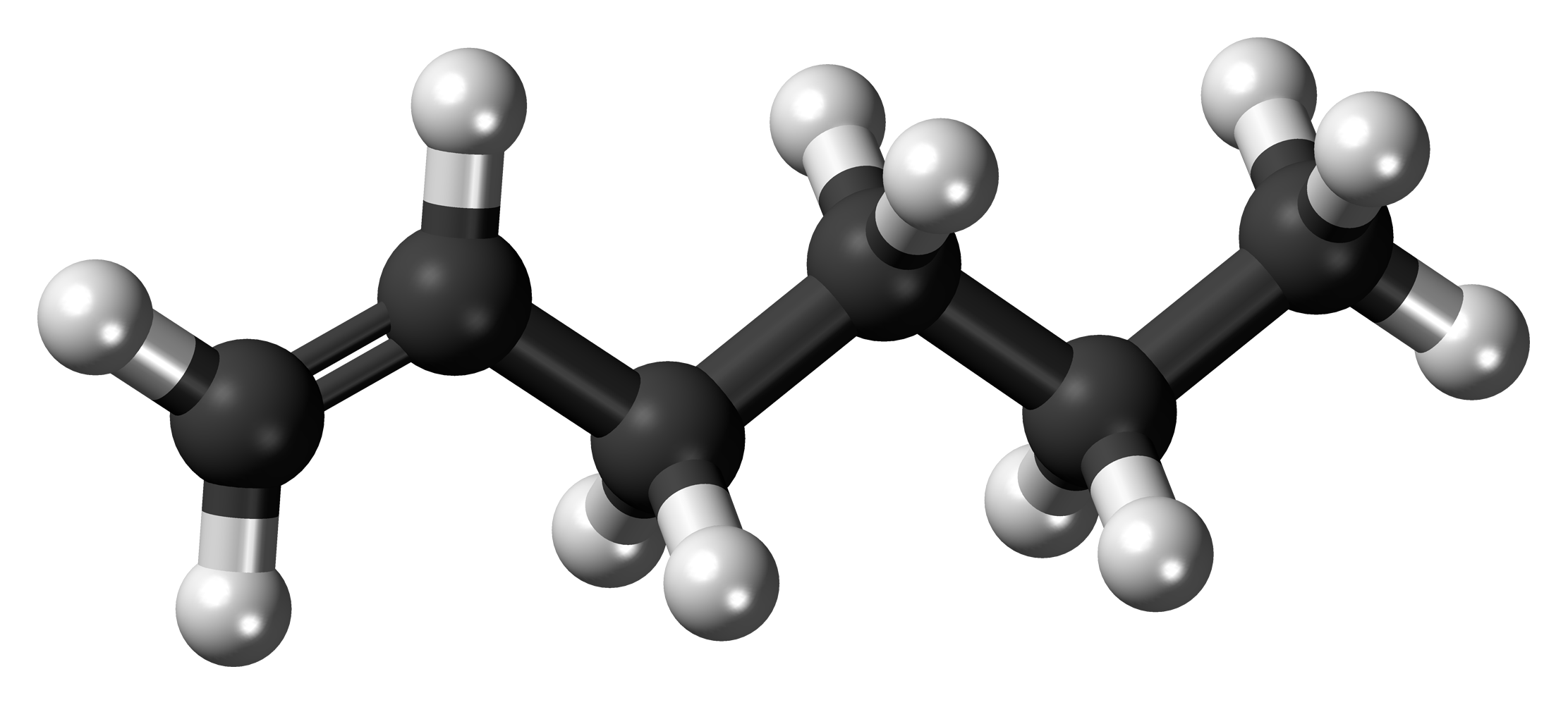

Names
- Preferred IUPAC name Hex-1-ene
- Other names Hexene, Hexylene, Butyl ethylene

Identifiers
CAS Number	592-41-6
3D model (JSmol)	Interactive image; Interactive image
ChEBI	CHEBI:24579
ChEMBL	ChEMBL1548726
ChemSpider	11109
ECHA InfoCard	100.008.868
EC Number	209-753-1
PubChem CID	11597
RTECS number	MP6670000
UNII	B38ZZ8C206
UN number	2370
CompTox Dashboard (EPA)	DTXSID4025402
- InChI: InChI=1S/C6H12/c1-3-5-6-4-2/h3H,1,4-6H2,2H3 Key: LIKMAJRDDDTEIG-UHFFFAOYSA-N; InChI=1/C6H12/c1-3-5-6-4-2/h3H,1,4-6H2,2H3 Key: LIKMAJRDDDTEIG-UHFFFAOYAY
- SMILES: C=CCCCC; CCCCC=C

Properties
Chemical formula	C_{6}H_{12}
Molar mass	84.162 g·mol^{−1}
Appearance	Colorless liquid
Density	0.673 g/cm^{3}
Melting point	−139.8 °C (−219.6 °F; 133.3 K)
Boiling point	63 °C (145 °F; 336 K)
Critical point (T, P)	504 K (230 °C), 3.158 MPa
Solubility in water	Insoluble
Refractive index (n_{D})	1.3879
Viscosity	0.51 cP (0.51 mPa·s) at 28°C

Thermochemistry
Heat capacity (C)	183.3 J/(mol K)
Std molar entropy (S^{⦵}_{298})	295.2 J/(mol K)

Hazards
- GHS labelling
Pictograms	(GHS02: Flammable) (GHS07: Exclamation mark) (GHS08: Health hazard)
Signal word	Warning
Hazard statements	H225, H304, H319
Precautionary statements	P210, P233, P240, P241, P242, P243, P264, P280, P301+P310, P303+P361+P353, P305+P351+P338, P331, P337+P313, P370+P378, P403+P235, P405, P501
NFPA 704 (fire diamond)	1 3 0
Safety data sheet (SDS)	External MSDS

Supplementary data page
- 1-Hexene (data page)
- Except where otherwise noted, data are given for materials in their standard state (at 25 °C [77 °F], 100 kPa). verify (what is ?) Infobox references

1-Hexene (hex-1-ene) is an organic compound with the formula C_{6}H_{12}. It is an alkene that is classified in industry as higher olefin and an alpha-olefin, the latter term meaning that the double bond is located at the alpha (primary) position, endowing the compound with higher reactivity and thus useful chemical properties. 1-Hexene is an industrially significant linear alpha olefin. It is a colourless liquid.

== Production ==
1-Hexene is commonly manufactured by two general routes: (i) full-range processes via the oligomerization of ethylene and (ii) on-purpose technology. A minor route to 1-hexene, used commercially on smaller scales, is the dehydration of hexanol. Prior to the 1970s, 1-hexene was also manufactured by the thermal cracking of waxes. Linear internal hexenes were manufactured by chlorination/dehydrochlorination of linear paraffins.

Ethylene oligomerization combines ethylene molecules to produce linear alpha-olefins of various chain lengths with an even number of carbon atoms. This approach result in a distribution or “full range” of alpha-olefins. The Shell higher olefin process (SHOP) employs this approach. Linde and SABIC have developed the α-SABLIN technology using the oligomerization of ethylene to produce 21 percent 1-hexene. CP Chemicals and Innovene also have full-range processes. Typically, 1-hexene content ranges from about twenty percent distribution in the Ethyl (Innovene) process, whereas only twelve percent of distribution in the CP Chemicals and Idemitsu processes.

An on purpose route to 1-hexene using ethylene trimerization was first brought on stream in Qatar in 2003 by Chevron-Phillips. A second plant was scheduled to start in 2011 in Saudi Arabia and a third planned for 2014 in the US. The Sasol process is also considered an on-purpose route to 1-hexene. Sasol commercially employs Fischer–Tropsch synthesis to make fuels from synthesis gas derived from coal. The synthesis recovers 1-hexene from the aforementioned fuel streams, where the initial 1-hexene concentration cut may be 60% in a narrow distillation, with the remainder being vinylidenes, linear and branched internal olefins, linear and branched paraffins, alcohols, aldehydes, carboxylic acids, and aromatic compounds. The trimerization of ethylene by homogeneous catalysts has been demonstrated. An alternative on-purpose route has been reported by Lummus Technology.

== Applications ==
The primary use of 1-hexene is as a comonomer in production of polyethylene. High-density polyethylene (HDPE) and linear low-density polyethylene (LLDPE) use approximately 2–4% and 8–10% of comonomers, respectively.

Another significant use of 1-hexene is the production of the linear aldehyde heptanal via hydroformylation (oxo synthesis). Heptanal can be converted to the short-chain fatty acid heptanoic acid or the alcohol heptanol.

The chemical is used in the synthesis of flavors, perfumes, dyes and resins.

== Hazards ==
1-Hexene is considered dangerous because in liquid and vapor form it is highly flammable and may be fatal if swallowed and enters airways.

The widespread use of 1-hexene may result in its release to the environment through various waste streams. The substance is toxic to aquatic organisms.
