= 1-Dodecene =

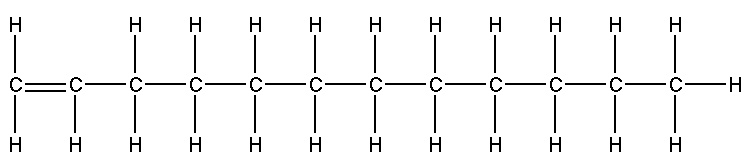

Names
- Preferred IUPAC name Dodec-1-ene
- Other names 1-Dodecene α-Dodecene; Dodecene-1; Adacene 12; Dodecylene

Identifiers
CAS Number	112-41-4
3D model (JSmol)	Interactive image
ChEBI	CHEBI:89713
ChemSpider	7891
ECHA InfoCard	100.003.608
EC Number	203-968-4
PubChem CID	8183
UNII	WYE669F3GR
CompTox Dashboard (EPA)	DTXSID50894451 DTXSID5026914, DTXSID50894451
- InChI: InChI=1S/C12H24/c1-3-5-7-9-11-12-10-8-6-4-2/h3H,1,4-12H2,2H3
- SMILES: CCCCCCCCCCC=C

Properties
Chemical formula	C_{12}H_{24}
Molar mass	168.324 g·mol^{−1}
Appearance	colorless liquid with a mild, pleasant odor.
Density	0.7584 g/cm^{3}
Melting point	−35.2 °C (−31.4 °F; 238.0 K)
Boiling point	213.8˚C
Solubility in water	Insoluble
Solubility	Soluble in ethanol, ethyl ether, and acetone
Vapor pressure	0.0159 mm Hg at 25 °C

Hazards
- Occupational safety and health (OHS/OSH)
Main hazards	Irritates skin and eyes, harmful if swallowed, wear safety glasses and have adequate ventilation
NFPA 704 (fire diamond)	0 2 0
Flash point	77 °C (171 °F; 350 K)

Related compounds
Related Alkenes	Octene; Nonene; Undecene; Dodecene
- Except where otherwise noted, data are given for materials in their standard state (at 25 °C [77 °F], 100 kPa). Infobox references

1-Dodecene is an alkene with the formula C_{10}H_{21}CH=CH_{2}, consisting of a chain of twelve carbon atoms ending with a double bond. While there are many isomers of dodecene depending on which carbon the double bond is placed, this isomer is of greater commercial importance. It is classified as an alpha-olefin. Alpha-olefins are distinguished by having a double bond at the primary or alpha (α) position. This location of a double bond enhances the reactivity of the compound and makes it useful for a number of applications, especially for the production of detergents.

== Production and reactions ==
1-Dodecene is commercially produced by oligomerization of ethylene via a number of processes. In the Shell Higher Olefin Process (SHOP), a nickel catalyst is employed. In processes developed by Gulf and by Ethyl Corporations, triethylaluminium is the catalyst. Similar to the SHOP method, these processes rely on ethylene insertion into an Al-alkyl bond competitively with beta-hydride elimination to give the alpha-olefin, regenerating an aluminium hydride. Other processes have been developed. Tridecanal is produced by hydroformylation of 1-dodecene.
