= Decenoic acid =

Class of chemical compounds

Decenoic acid is any mono-carboxylic acid with an unbranched chain of ten carbons connected by eight single bonds and one double bond; that is, a chemical compound with formula HO(O=)C–(CH_{2})_{k}–CH=CH–(CH_{2})_{7-k}–H, where k is between 0 and 7 inclusive.

There are fifteen of these compounds, that can be identified by the position k+2 of the double bond and (for k ≤ 6) the configuration (cis or trans) of the single bonds adjacent to it.

Decenoic acids are technically mono-unsaturated fatty acids (with code C10:1), although they are relatively rare in nature.

== Examples ==
=== Free acids and esters ===
Some isomers (and esters thereof) that have received attention are

- cis-2-decenoic acid or (2Z)-dec-2-enoic acid. (CAS 15790-91-7, Nikkaji J1.577.978K) Produced by Pseudomonas aeruginosa, inhibits biofilm formation.
- trans-2-decenoic acid or (2E)-dec-2-enoic acid. Flavoring agent (CAS 334-49-6, Nikkaji J98.042K, FEMA 3913, JECFA 1372, FDA 332T8TH7B1); Density: 0.92-0.93 25 °C. Refractive Index: ~1.46 at 20.00 °C. MP: 12 °C BP: 161-162 °C. at 15.00 torr, 278-279 °C. at 1 atm. Odor described as "fresh, fruity (peach), slightly oily and waxy". Stimulates nerve cell regeneration and biofilm disintegration. Excreted by the caries bacterium Streptococcus mutans and inhibits growth of the fungus Candida albicans.
  - ethyl trans-2-decenoate (CAS 7367-88-6, Pubchem 5463904, 6047581, Nikkaji J212.367C, J1.075.382A, FDA B2K05S6L5Q, JECFA 1814, FEMA 3641) Flavoring agent. BP: ~134 °C. at 20.00 torr, 140 °C. at 30.00 torr. Odor described as "green, fruity (apple, pear), waxy." "peely citrus".
- cis-3-decenoic acid or (3Z)-dec-3-enoic acid. (CAS 2430-93-5, Nikkaji J3.028G) The female sex pheromone of the furniture carpet beetle Anthrenus flavipes. Odor deascribed as "fatty".
- trans-3-decenoic acid (CAS 53678-20-9, Beilstein 1722688, Pubchem 5282725, Nikkaji J98.043I) Occurs in some natural extracts.
- cis-4-decenoic acid or (4Z)-dec-4-enoic acid. (CAS 505-90-8, Pubchem 5312351, Nikkaji J79.643C, FDA 6PR4L1KTAZ) A metabolite found in human plasma in certain pathologies. Odor described as "fatty, green".
  - ethyl cis-4-decenoate (CAS 7367-84-2, Pubchem 5463488, Nikkaji J212.366E) Flavoring agent. Density: 0.883 at 20 °C. Refractive Index: 1.438 at 20 °C. BP: 128 °C. at 30 torr, 236-237 °C. at 1 atm.
- trans-4-decenoic acid or (4E)-dec-4-enoic acid. (CAS 57602-94-5, Pubchem 5282726, Nikkaji J98.044G, FDA S0TXC5QGPU) Result of reacting 1‐octene and manganese(III) acetate.
  - ethyl trans-4-decenoate (CAS 76649-16-6, Pubchem 5362583, Nikkaji J208.443K, FDA 3I89X5937N, JECFA 341, FEMA 3642) Density: ~0.876 at 25.00 °C. Refractive Index: ~1.437 at 20.00 °C. BP: 72.00 °C. at 0.10 torr. Odor described as "green, fruity (pineapple, apple), waxy, cognac".
- cis-5-decenoic acid (CAS 84168-28-5, Pubchem 15101542, Nikkaji J2.261.052J, FDA 5R82Y8PAHS) Odor described as "fatty, green".
- trans-5-decenoic acid (CAS 16424-55-8, Nikkaji J2.261.051A, Pubchem 5362593, FDA P9YWE0K08Y) Odor described as "milky, fatty".
- caproleic acid, 9-decenoic acid, or dec-9-enoic acid. (CAS 14436-32-9, PUBchem 61743, FEMA 3660, Nikkaji J81.770H, FDA U2E27P3TGK) Small amounts in goat and cow milk, and oils of Sapium sebiferum and Litsea cubeba. Traces also in beer, wine, clams, Parmesan cheese and snails. Broad-spectrum antimicrobial. Flavoring agent (FEMA 3660, JECFA 328). Density: ~0.9 at 20.00 °C. BP: ~270 °C at 1 atm, 130-135 °C at 1-3 torr, 95 °C at 0.1 torr. Refractive index n_{D}^{20}: 1.4488. Irritating to skin. Used as flavouring agent. Odor described as milky, waxy, green, fatty, soapy, creamy, cheesy".
  - ethyl caproleate, 9-decenoic acid ethyl ester (CAS 67233-91-4, Pubchem 522255, Nikkaji J976.137C, FDA OI02K838CN) used as flavoring agent. Odor described as "fruity". Density: ~0.878 at 25.00 °C. Refractive Index: ~1.44 at 20.00 °C. BP: 249-250 °C. at 1 atm.

=== Unspecified isomers and mixtures ===
The following unspecified isomers or mixtures have also been mentioned:

- From 3-decenoic acid:
  - butyl 2-decenoate, isomer unspecified (CAS 7492-45-7, Pubchem 5463906, Nikkaji J421.861B, FDA 38KP1S005I, JECFA 1348, FEMA 2194), is a flavoring agent with odor described as "fruity (peach, apricot), green, fatty, coconut, walnut". Density: 0.87-0.88 at 25.00 °C. Refractive Index: ~1.45 at 20.00 °C. BP: 290-291 °C. at 1 atm. Flavouring agent.
  - methyl 2-decenoate, isomer unspecified (CAS 2482-39-5, Pubchem 5368064, Nikkaji J110.937E, FDA 7YEW204WFW), is used as flavouring ingredient, with odor described as "mushroom".
- 4-decenoic acid, unspecified isomer (CAS 26303-90-2, Nikkaji J39.562E, FDA S0TXC5QGPU, JECFA 1287, FEMA 3914), is said to occur in hops and beer. It is a flavoring agent, with odor described as "fruity". Density: ~0.92 at 20.00 °C. Refractive Index: ~1.15 at 20.00 °C. BP: 97.00 to 98.00 °C. at 0.30 torr. It is listed as "no concern" food additive (FEMA 3914, JECFA 1287) by the FAO/WHO JECFA.
- A mixture of 5-decenoic and 6-decenoic acids (JECFA 327, FDA 8H370297TA), with the trade name "milk lactone", is allowed in the US as generally recognized as safe (GRAS) flavorings, such as in imitation dairy products with common name "milk lactone" for their milk-like aroma.

=== Derivatives ===
Derivatives of these acids include:

- 4-Hydroxy-4-methyl-cis-7-decenoic acid. Its gamma lactone is a flavoring agent (FEMA 3937, JECFA 1159).
- 5-hydroxy-7-decenoic acid. Its lactone was identified as a significant component of the aroma of black tea, reminiscent of flowers and dried fruit, and is a flavoring agent (FEMA 3745, JECFA 247).
- 9-hydroxy-trans-2-decenoic acid. Another queen bee pheromone.
- 9-oxo-cis-2-decenoic acid. Is converted to the trans isomer by light and may function as inhibitor of bee colony settlement.
- 9-oxo-trans-2-decenoic acid.A pheromone produced by queen bees.
- 10-hydroxy-trans-2-decenoic acid, "queen bee acid" (CAS 14113-05-4, Pubchem 5312738, Nikkaji J838.856C, FDA 76B519G7TJ). The main fatty acid in bee's royal jelly. Characteristic odor.
- 9-Oxodecenoic acid Queen substance
- 10-oxo-7-hydroxy-trans-8-decenoic acid. Formed by plants in response to mechanical trauma.
- 10-oxo-trans-8-decenoic acid. A metabolite of the mushrooms Agaricus bisporus and Pleurotus pulmonarius. Possibly a fungal growth hormone.

== See also ==
- Decanoic acid, capric acid, HO(O=)C–(CH_{2})_{9}–H
- Decadienoic acid
