= Diisobutene =

Diisobutene (also known as Diisobutylene and Isooctene) refers to a pair of organic compounds with the overall formula C_{8}H_{16}. The isomers have the same carbon skeleton but differ in the location of the C=C bond. Both are colorless liquids with very similar physical properties.

These compounds arise via the acid catalyzed dimerization of isobutene, a reaction that proceeds via the carbocation (CH_{3})_{3}C^{+}. The process also leads to some triisobutenes and tetraisobutenes. The commercial material is typically a mixture of isomers, with the terminal 1-ene being the major component. The preferential formation of the less substituted alkene can be counterintuitive to chemists, but can be explained by assessing its transition state.

Diisobutene isomers
Image			Mixed isomers
Structure	CH_{2}=C(CH_{3})-CH_{2}C(CH_{3})_{3}	(CH_{3})_{2}C=CHC(CH_{3})_{3}
Systematic name	2,4,4-Trimethyl-1-pentene	2,4,4-Trimethyl-2-pentene	2,4,4-trimethylpentene
CAS number	[107-39-1]	[107-40-4]	[25167-70-8]
Density	0.7150 g/mL	0.7218 g/mL	0.717 g/mL
Melting point	-93.5 °C	-106.3 °C	-50 °C
Boiling point	101.4 °C	104.9 °C	102 °C

== History and applications ==
Hydrogenation is performed at a significant scale to give isooctane, which is an important fuel additive. Diisobutene was first synthesized from tert-butyl alcohol in 1926 by Ethyl Corporation's J. W. McKinney as an intermediate to the aforementioned alkane, also first synthesized by him, during the development of the octane rating standard by Graham Edgar.

Diisobutene is also used as precursors to isononylol and octylphenols by hydroformylation/hydrogenation and phenol alkylation, respectively. Both are precursors to plasticizers. The isononylol (3,5,5-trimethyl-hexan-1-ol) is a precursor to 3,5,5-trimethylhexyl acetate, a commercial fragrance.

== See also ==
- 1-Octene - the corresponding linear alpha-olefin
