= 1-Octene =

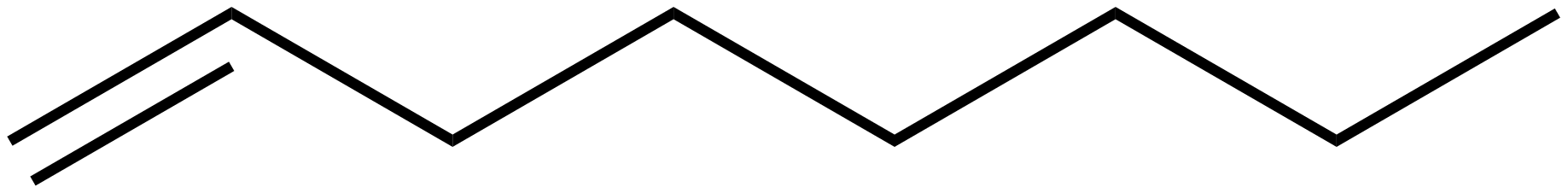
- 1-Octene

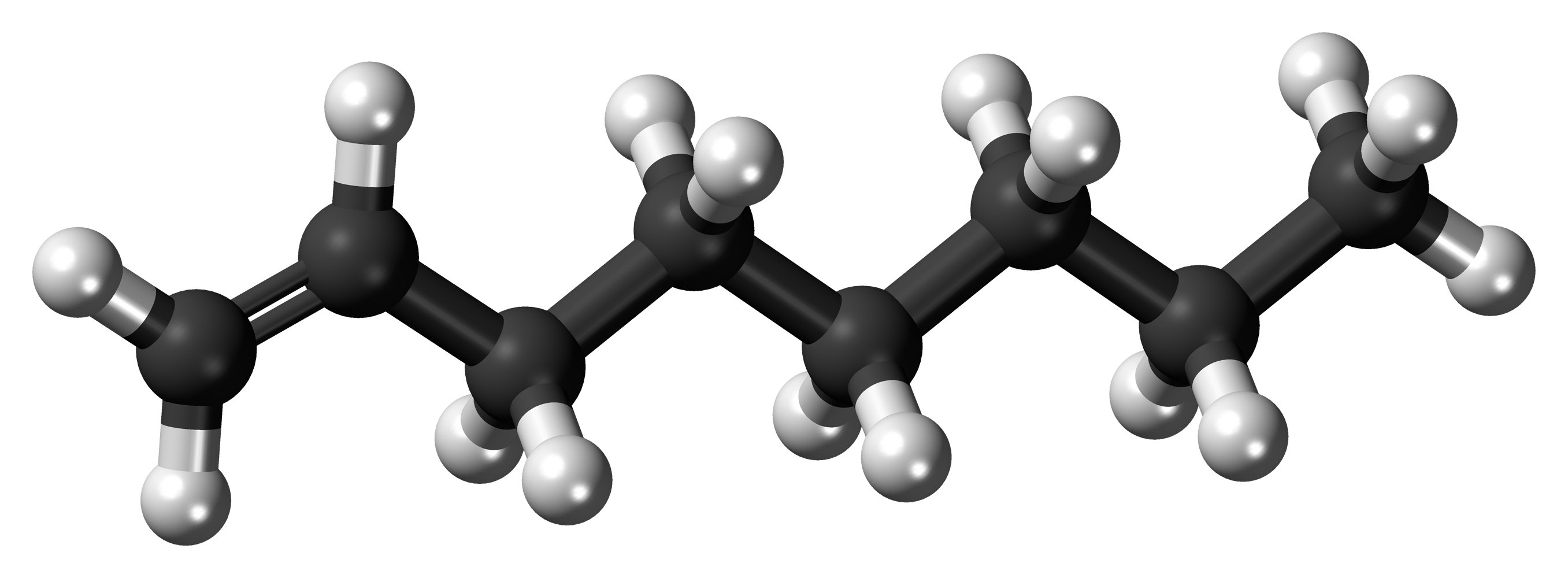

Names
- Preferred IUPAC name Oct-1-ene
- Other names Octene-1, octylene; 1-n-octene; hexylethylene; oct-1-ene; octene; caprylene

Identifiers
CAS Number	111-66-0
3D model (JSmol)	Interactive image
ChEBI	CHEBI:46708
ChemSpider	7833
ECHA InfoCard	100.003.540
PubChem CID	8125
UNII	E5VK21B9RC
CompTox Dashboard (EPA)	DTXSID6025804
- InChI: InChI=1S/C8H16/c1-3-5-7-8-6-4-2/h3H,1,4-8H2,2H3 Key: KWKAKUADMBZCLK-UHFFFAOYSA-N; InChI=1/C8H16/c1-3-5-7-8-6-4-2/h3H,1,4-8H2,2H3 Key: KWKAKUADMBZCLK-UHFFFAOYAN
- SMILES: C=CCCCCCC

Properties
Chemical formula	C_{8}H_{16}
Molar mass	112.24 g/mol
Density	0.715 g/cm^{3}
Melting point	−101.7 °C (−151.1 °F; 171.5 K)
Boiling point	121 °C (250 °F; 394 K)
- Except where otherwise noted, data are given for materials in their standard state (at 25 °C [77 °F], 100 kPa). verify (what is ?) Infobox references

1-Octene is an organic compound with a formula CH_{2}CHC_{6}H_{13}. The alkene is classified as a higher olefin and alpha-olefin, meaning that the double bond is located at the alpha (primary) position, endowing this compound with higher reactivity and thus useful chemical properties. 1-Octene is one of the important linear alpha olefins in industry. It is a colourless liquid.

== Synthesis ==
In industry, 1-octene is commonly manufactured by two main routes: oligomerization of ethylene and by Fischer–Tropsch synthesis followed by purification. Another route to 1-octene that has been used commercially on a small scale is dehydration of alcohols. Prior to the 1970s, 1-octene was also manufactured by thermal cracking of waxes, whereas linear internal octenes were also manufactured by chlorination/dehydrochlorination of linear alkanes.

There are five commercial processes that oligomerize ethylene to 1-octene. Four of these processes produce 1-octene as a part of a wide distribution of alpha-olefins. In typical circumstances, 1-hexene content of the entire distribution of alpha-olefins ranges from about 25% of the distribution in the Ethyl (Innovene) process to about 8% of distribution in some modes of the Gulf (CP Chemicals) and Idemitsu processes.

The only commercial process to isolate 1-octene from a wide mixture of C_{8} hydrocarbons is practiced by Sasol, a South African oil and gas and petrochemical company. For commercial purposes, Sasol employs Fischer–Tropsch synthesis to make fuels from synthesis gas derived from coal and recovers 1-octene from these fuel streams, where the initial 1-octene concentration in a narrow distillation cut may be 60%, with the remainder being vinylidenes, linear and branched internal olefins, linear and branched paraffins, alcohols, aldehydes, carboxylic acids, and aromatic hydrocarbons.

Another route to 1-octene involves butadiene telomerization of butadiene. This technology was commercialized by Dow in a facility in Tarragona. 1-Methoxy- 2,7-octadiene is an intermediate in this process.

Yet another route converts 1-heptene to 1-octene plant based on a Fischer-Tropsch-derived C_{7} olefin stream (Sasol, Secunda).

Other 1-octene technologies exist based on selective tetramerisation of ethylene.

== Applications ==
The main use of 1-octene is as a comonomer in production of polyethylene. High-density polyethylene (HDPE) and linear low-density polyethylene (LLDPE) use approximately 2–4% and 8–10% of comonomers, respectively.

Another significant use of 1-octene is for production of linear aldehyde via oxo synthesis (hydroformylation) to give the C9 aldehyde (nonanal). Oxidation of this aldehyde gives the short-chain fatty acid nonanoic acid. Hydrogenation of the same aldehyde gives the fatty alcohol 1-nonanol, which is used as a plasticizer.
