= Comonomer =

In polymer chemistry, a comonomer refers to a polymerizable precursor to a copolymer aside from the principal monomer. In some cases, only small amounts of a comonomer are employed, in other cases substantial amounts of comonomers are used. Furthermore, in some cases, the comonomers are statistically incorporated within the polymer chain, whereas in other cases, they aggregate. The distribution of comonomers is referred to as the "blockiness" of a copolymer.

== Polyolefins ==
1-Octene, 1-hexene, and 1-butene are used comonomers in the manufacture of polyethylenes. The advantages to such copolymers has led to a focus on catalysts that facilitate the incorporation of these comonomers, e.g., constrained geometry complexes.

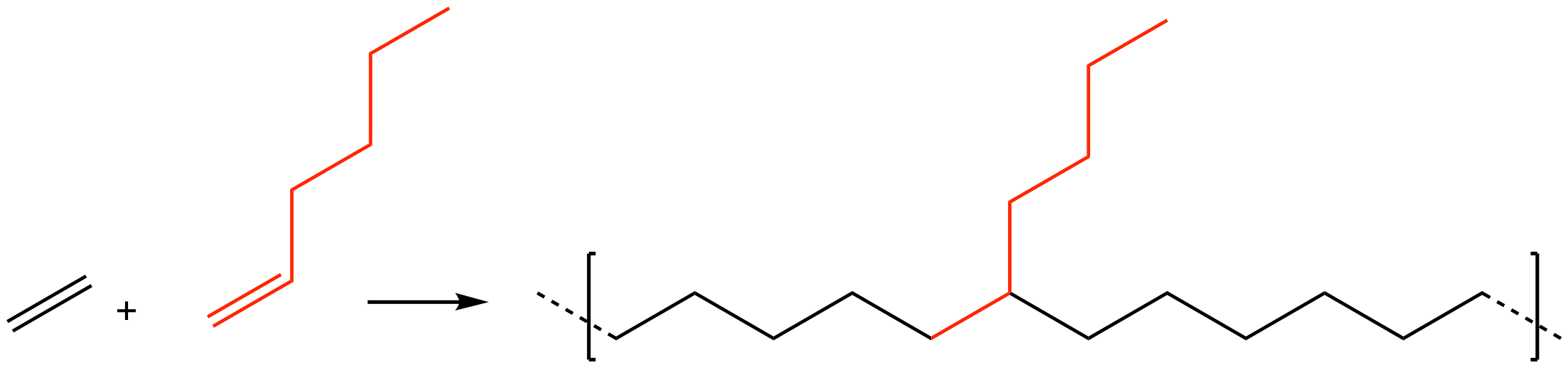
In this conversion, 1-hexene (red) is a comonomer in the formation of a modified polyethylene.

Comonomers are often employed to improve the plastification of polymeric materials, i.e. the flexibility of the polymer. Unlike traditional plasticizers, comonomers are not leachable.

== Styrenics ==
In other cases, comonomers are used to introduce crosslinking. Divinylbenzene, for example, when copolymerized with styrene, gives a crosslinked polystyrene.

== Acrylates ==
The homopolymers of acrylate esters (e.g., butyl acrylate) have few applications. Copolymers however have many applications/ They are produced by copolymerization of alkyl acrylates and one or more of the following comonomers methyl methacrylate, styrene, acrylonitrile, vinyl acetate, vinyl chloride, vinylidene chloride, and butadiene.
