= Terminal alkene =

Hydrocarbon compounds with a C=C bond at the alpha carbon

Hex-1-ene, a typical alpha-olefin. The blue numbers show the IUPAC numbering of the atoms in the backbone chain of the molecule. The red symbols show the common nomenclature labeling of the main chain atoms. The double bond of an alpha olefin is between the #1 and #2 (IUPAC) or α and β (common) carbon atoms.

In organic chemistry, terminal alkenes (alpha-olefins, α-olefins, or 1-alkenes) are a family of organic compounds which are alkenes (also known as olefins) with a chemical formula C_{x}H_{2x}, distinguished by having a double bond at the primary, alpha (α), or 1- position. This location of a double bond enhances the reactivity of the compound and makes it useful for a number of applications.

== Classification ==
There are two types of alpha-olefins, branched and linear (or normal). The chemical properties of branched alpha-olefins with a branch at either the second (vinylidene) or the third carbon number are significantly different from the properties of linear alpha-olefins and those with branches on the fourth carbon number and further from the start of the chain.

Examples of linear alpha-olefins are propene, but-1-ene and dec-1-ene. An example of a branched alpha-olefin is isobutylene.

== Production ==
A variety of methods are employed for production of alpha-olefins. One class of methods starts with ethylene which is either dimerized or oligomerized. These conversions are respectively effected by the alphabutol process, giving 1-butene, and the Shell higher olefin process which gives a range of alpha-olefins. The former is based on titanium-based catalysts, and the latter relies on nickel-based catalysts. A whole other approach to alpha-olefins, especially long chain derivatives, involves cracking of waxes:

R−CH_{2}−CH_{2}−CH−CH_{2}−R' → R−CH=CH_{2} + CH_{2}=CH−R' + H_{2}

In the PACOL process (paraffin conversion to olefins), linear alkanes are dehydrogenated over a platinum-based catalyst.

== Applications ==
Alpha-olefins are valued building blocks for other industrial chemicals.

A major portion of medium or long chain derivatives are converted to detergents and plasticizers. A common first step in making such products is hydroformylation followed by hydrogenation of the resulting aldehydes. Long chain alpha-olefins are also oligomerized to give medium molecular weight oils that serve as lubricants. Alkylation of benzene with alpha-olefins followed by ring-sulfonation gives linear alkylbenzene sulfonates (LABS) which are biodegradable detergents. Competing often with these petroleum-derived products are derivatives of fatty acids, such as fatty alcohols and fatty amines.

Low molecular weight alpha-olefins (butenes, hexenes, etc.) are used as comonomers, which are incorporated into polyethylene. Some are subjected to olefin metathesis as a route to propylene.

== See also ==
- Vinyl group
