= C6H12 =

The molecular formula C_{6}H_{12} may refer to following structural isomers:

== Acyclic Compounds ==
- Hexenes
  - 1-Hexene
  - 2-Hexene
  - 3-Hexene
- Methylpentenes
  - 2-Methyl-1-pentene
  - 3-Methyl-1-pentene
  - 4-Methyl-1-pentene
  - 2-Methyl-2-pentene
  - 3-Methyl-2-pentene
  - 4-Methyl-2-pentene
- Dimethylbutenes
  - 2,3-Dimethyl-1-butene
  - 3,3-Dimethyl-1-butene
  - 2,3-Dimethyl-2-butene
- 2-Ethyl-1-butene

== Cyclic compounds ==
- Cyclohexane
- Methylcyclopentane
- Ethylcyclobutane
- Dimethylcyclobutanes
  - 1,1-Dimethylcyclobutane
  - 1,2-Dimethylcyclobutane
  - 1,3-Dimethylcyclobutane
- Trimethylcyclopropanes
  - 1,1,2-Trimethylcyclopropane
  - 1,2,3-Trimethylcyclopropane
- Ethylmethylcyclopropanes
  - 1-Ethyl-1-methylcyclopropane
  - 1-Ethyl-2-methylcyclopropane
- Isopropylcyclopropane
- Propylcyclopropane

Note: cis-trans isomers and enantiomers are not included in this list. .---.
