= Gankin =

Gankin (Russian: Ганкин), feminine form Gankina (Russian: Ганкина) is a matronymic Jewish surname. Notable people with the surname include: Notable people with this surname include:

- Artyom Gankin
- Denis Gankin, Kazakhstani archer
- Victor Gankin, Russian-American scientist
- Vitaliy Gankin, Russian sprint canoer

== See also ==
- Hankin
