= EPIC Systems, Inc =

EPIC Systems, Inc. is an American multi-discipline engineering and fabrication firm located in Saint Louis, Missouri. EPIC's name is an acronym which stands for “Electrical, Process, Instrumentation and Control Systems”. EPIC was founded in 1995 as a privately held automation firm and has grown to include divisions for complete modular process plants and systems, integrated packaging and assembly lines, custom machinery manufacturing, and machine vision system integration.

In 2009, EPIC saw a 21% growth rate within three years. Revenue grew exponentially during this time period (2005–2008), and the company had 50 employees. EPIC is ranked by Inc. 500 as a Top 100 Fastest Growing Engineering Company (#71 United States) and Top 100 Fastest Growing Missouri Company (#55) EPIC is also listed by the St. Louis Post Dispatch as one of the “Top Places to Work” in St. Louis for 2013.

== History ==
=== Early years ===
In 1995, two partners, John R. Schott, P.E. and Matt Quinn, founded EPIC with $1,000 in personal savings. The two founders were both experienced plant engineers, and founded EPIC to service the manufacturing industries with which they were familiar. They formed the acronym “EPIC” from the words "Electrical, Process, Instrumentation and Control Systems", which described the firm's original focus on automation and controls for process systems. The company was founded in St. Louis, MO and provided consulting, design engineering services and automation for process plants and packing line integration.

Two years after opening, in 1997, EPIC expanded by adding a fabrication plant to support the design and construction of modular process plants.

This marked the expansion from consulting, automation and design to the four distinct divisions of EPIC that exist currently. The new facility allowed for in-house fabrication and construction management services. EPIC began offering complete design/build of process plants to industrial clients in 1999.

=== Rapid Expansion ===
In 2001, EPIC was named a FAST 50 Newcomer by St. Louis Commerce Magazine. In 2004, EPIC was recognized as one of St. Louis's fastest growing private companies by receiving two different growth-based awards: The Regional Technology Award and the St. Louis Fast 50 Technology Award. EPIC went on to become a three-time winner of the Regional Technology Award and a four-time winner of the Fast 50 Technology Award.

During this same time period, EPIC grew from a company of two employees (the owners), to approximately 30 employees. EPIC moved into an expanded 40,000 sq ft facility in 2004, which is the current location of the business. The new building in St. Louis, Missouri, features two separate facilities dedicated to the separation of industrial and sanitary applications. This feature follows ASME Bioprocessing Equipment guidelines, isolating the shop for carbon steel and stainless (high alloy) fabrication.

In 2008 a line integration division was added to EPIC, specializing in complete design/build of packaging and assembly lines. A custom machine group was also formed within EPIC, focused on manufacturing hard-to-find or non-existent machines. That same year, EPIC began giving the annual “EPIC Way Award” to recognize one outstanding employee who best exemplifies the spirit and values upon which EPIC was founded.

=== Restructuring and Continued Growth ===
By 2009, EPIC had seen a 21% growth rate within three years. Revenue grew exponentially during this time period (2005–2008), and the company had expanded to 50 employees. In 2009, one of the original founders of EPIC, Matt Quinn, sold his half of EPIC to the other owner, John Schott, making Schott the sole owner and President of EPIC Systems.

EPIC expanded their automation services again in 2011 with the addition of the Insta-Panel control system. The Insta-Panel consisted of a standard control box equipped with a flexible HMI. The company marketed the Insta-Panel as an all-in-one automation tool that allows manufacturers to quickly automate or upgrade industrial systems. That same year, EPIC also released a custom turnkey medical device assembly machine for a top biotechnology company.

Expansion continued in 2012 when EPIC added an additional 7,000 feet of office and manufacturing space. This expansion allowed the machine vision group to move into a larger space. Cognex awarded EPIC the “Partner System Integrator of the Year Award” for the highest growth nationwide of complete machine vision systems. EPIC was also a finalist in Control Engineering's Integrator of the Year competition in 2012 and 2013.

== Company Overview ==
=== Business Model ===
EPIC is an engineering and automation firm that was founded in 1995 and is headquartered in St. Louis, Missouri.

The majority of EPIC's business is conducted in the United States, but EPIC has also implemented systems in 17 other countries including India, China, Australia, Germany, France, the U.K, The United Arab Emirates, Puerto Rico, Mexico, Brazil, and South Africa.

==== Modular Process Systems ====
EPIC Systems, Inc. is a global provider of modular plant and process systems. Sometimes referred to as modular process skids, these systems for manufacturing chemical, biological or other products are self-contained and easily transportable. They are considered an alternative to traditional stick-built construction. EPIC takes their customers' proprietary technology and designs/ builds modular process systems across many industries, including: petrochemical, chemical, alternative fuels (including Gas to Liquid technologies), agricultural, food and beverage and consumer products industries. The specific types of modular process systems offered include:

- Raw Material Storage & Delivery Systems
- Batch Processing Systems
  - Batch Reactor Systems
  - Batch Mixing Systems
  - Separation process Chemical Separation Systems
    - Industrial Distillation Systems
  - Coating Systems
- Continuous Production Systems
  - Continuous Inline Blending Systems
- Industrial Pipe Bridges
- Utility Systems
  - Heat Transfer Systems
  - Electric Heat Trace Systems
  - Process Chiller Systems
  - Nitrogen Generation Systems
  - Fuel Delivery Systems
  - Clean-In-Place (CIP) Systems
  - Industrial Wastewater Treatment Systems
- Pilot Plant
- Plant Scale up
- Production Plants

=== Packaging Line Integration ===
EPIC provides customized services for complete production line integration. The company specializes in integration of packaging line systems.

=== Machine Vision System Integration ===
EPIC Systems, Inc. provides deployment strategies for a wide range of inspection or imaging applications for machine vision. EPIC engineers utilize lighting and smart camera technology to accurately design, build and automate machine vision systems.
