= BPE =

BPE may refer to:

== Businesses and organisations ==
- Banco Popular Español, banking group in Spain
- Bureau of Public Enterprises, government agency in Nigeria
- Bürgerbewegung Pax Europa (Citizens' Movement Pax Europa), counter-jihad organisation in Germany
- Bráithreachas Phoblacht na hÉireann (BPÉ), the Irish Republican Brotherhood 1858-1924

== Science and technology ==
- Benign prostatic hyperplasia, benign prostate enlargement
- .500 Black Powder Express (.500 BPE)
- Borated polyethylene, a lightweight neutron absorber; see CUORE
- Byte-pair encoding, an algorithm for encoding strings
- ASME BPE, a standard published by the American Society of Mechanical Engineers (Bioprocessing Equipment)

== Other uses ==
- Qinhuangdao Beidaihe Airport (IATA code), China
- Bachelor of Physical Education, a bachelor degree
- Bangi–Putrajaya Expressway, a proposed road in Malaysia
