= Methylpentene =

Methylpentene is an alkene with a molecular formula C_{6}H_{12}. The prefix "methyl-" is derived from the fact that there is a methyl(CH_{3}) branch, the word root "-pent-" is derived from the fact that there are 5 carbon atoms in the parent chain, while the "-ene" suffix denotes that there is a double bond present, as per IUPAC nomenclature. Following are the possible structural isomers of methylpentene:

Structural isomers
Compound	Structural Formula
3-Methyl-1-pentene	
4-Methyl-1-pentene	
2-Methyl-2-pentene	
3-Methyl-2-pentene	
4-Methyl-2-pentene	
2-Methyl-1-pentene	

== See also ==
- Polymethylpentene
