= Dimethylbutene =

Dimethylbutene is an alkene with a molecular formula C_{6}H_{12}. It has the following possible structural isomers:

- 2,3-Dimethyl-1-butene
- 3,3-Dimethyl-1-butene
- 2,3-Dimethyl-2-butene
