= Chemical resistance =

Characteristic of a material or surface

The chemical resistance of a material or surface can be determined in compliance with ISO 2812 Paints and varnishes – Determination of resistance to liquids – Part 1: Immersion in liquids other than water (ISO 2812-1:2007); German Version EN ISO 2812-1:2007 or Part 4: Spotting methods (ISO 2812-4:2007); German Version EN ISO 2812-4:2007. With these methods, a material or surface is exposed to the relevant chemical for a longer, defined period of time and the relevant area then inspected microscopically. Possible changes which could occur include:

- Discoloration
- Alteration in the degree of shine
- Softening
- Swelling
- Detachment of coatings
- Blistering

On completion of the defined test period, any residues of test liquid are removed and the material surface assessed and analyzed for visible alterations in accordance with DIN EN ISO 4628-1 to -5. To ascertain a possible regeneration time, the assessment is made once immediately after removal of the test liquid and again one hour later. In compliance with DIN EN ISO 4628-1, the following criteria are grouped into Classes 0 to 5: amount of damage (N), size of damage (S) and intensity of alteration (I). Any other changes observed are also noted. The assessment is made as shown below:
“Blistering, N2-S2” or “Discoloration, I1”

Any increase in the concentration of the test liquid on a surface due to drying in the real cleanroom environment must also be taken into consideration. The test procedure proves whether a material or surface is “resistant”, “partially resistant” or “not resistant” to a specific chemical over a defined period of time.
