= List of ISO standards 2000–2999 =

This is a list of published (Note: This list generally excludes draft versions.) International Organization for Standardization (ISO) standards and other deliverables. (Note: ISO deliverables include "specifications" (ISO/PAS, ISO/TS), "reports" (ISO/TR), etc, which are not referred to by ISO as "standards".) For a complete and up-to-date list of all the ISO standards, see the ISO catalogue.

The standards are protected by copyright and most of them must be purchased. However, about 300 of the standards produced by ISO and IEC's Joint Technical Committee 1 (JTC 1) have been made freely and publicly available.

== ISO 2000 – ISO 2299 ==
- ISO 2000:2020 Rubber, raw natural — Guidelines for the specification of technically specified rubber (TSR)
- ISO 2002:1975 Raw styrene-butadiene rubber (SBR) — Determination of organic acid content [Withdrawn: replaced with ISO 7781]
- ISO 2003:1975 Raw styrene-butadiene rubber (SBR) — Determination of soap content [Withdrawn: replaced with ISO 7781]
- ISO 2004:2017 Natural rubber latex concentrate — Centrifuged or creamed, ammonia-preserved types — Specifications
- ISO 2005:2014 Rubber latex, natural, concentrate — Determination of sludge content
- ISO 2006 Rubber latex, synthetic — Determination of mechanical stability
  - ISO 2006-1:2022 Part 1: High-speed method
  - ISO 2006-1:2009 Part 2: Moderate-speed method under load
- ISO 2007:2018 Rubber, unvulcanized — Determination of plasticity — Rapid-plastimeter method
- ISO 2008:1987 Rubber latex, styrene-butadiene — Determination of volatile unsaturates [Withdrawn without replacement]
- ISO 2009:2011 Slotted countersunk flat head screws — Product grade A
- ISO 2010:2011 Slotted raised countersunk head screws — Product grade A
- ISO 2011 Nuclear energy — Vocabulary — second list [draft incorporated into ISO 921]
- ISO 2012:1976 Textile machinery and accessories — Cone sectional warping machines — Maximum usable width
- ISO 2013:1983 Textile machinery and accessories — Beams — Method of measuring variations of form and position [Withdrawn: replaced with ISO 8116-8]
- ISO 2014:1976 Writing of calendar dates in all-numeric form [Withdrawn: replaced by ISO 8601:1988]
- ISO 2015:1976 Numbering of weeks [Withdrawn: replaced by ISO 8601:1988]
- ISO 2016:1981 Capillary solder fittings for copper tubes — Assembly dimensions and tests
- ISO 2017 Mechanical vibration and shock – Resilient mounting systems
  - ISO 2017-1:2005 Part 1: Technical information to be exchanged for the application of isolation systems
  - ISO 2017-2:2007 Part 2: Technical information to be exchanged for the application of vibration isolation associated with railway systems
  - ISO 2017-3:2015 Part 3: Technical information to be exchanged for application of vibration isolation to new buildings
- ISO 2020 Aerospace — Preformed flexible steel wire rope for aircraft controls
  - ISO 2020-1:1997 Part 1: Dimensions and loads
  - ISO 2020-2:1997 Part 2: Technical specification
- ISO 2021:1975 Data processing — Implementation of the ISO 8- bit coded character sets on punched cards [Withdrawn: replaced with ISO 6586]
- ISO/IEC 2022:1994 Information technology – Character code structure and extension techniques
- ISO 2023:1994 Rubber footwear — Lined industrial vulcanized-rubber boots — Specification [Withdrawn: replaced with ISO 20344]
- ISO 2024:1981 Rubber footwear, lined conducting — Specification [Withdrawn without replacement]
- ISO 2025:1972 Lined industrial rubber boots with general purpose oil resistance [Withdrawn without replacement]
- ISO 2026:2020 Aircraft — Connections for starting engines by air
- ISO 2027:1990 Natural rubber latex concentrate, evaporated, preserved — Specification
- ISO 2028:2015 Synthetic rubber latex — Preparation of dry polymer
- ISO 2030:2018 Granulated cork — Size analysis by mechanical sieving
- ISO 2031:2015 Granulated cork — Determination of apparent bulk density
- ISO 2032:1973 Heat-resisting equipment wires for aircraft
- ISO 2033:1983 Information processing – Coding of machine readable characters (MICR and OCR)
- ISO 2035:1974 Unplasticized polyvinyl chloride (PVC) moulded fittings for elastic sealing ring type joints for use under pressure — Pressure-resistance test [Withdrawn without replacement]
- ISO 2036:1976 Wood for manufacture of wood flooring — Symbols for marking according to species
- ISO 2037:1992 Stainless steel tubes for the food industry [Withdrawn without replacement]
- ISO 2039 Plastics — Determination of hardness
  - ISO 2039-1:2001 Part 1: Ball indentation method
  - ISO 2039-2:1987 Part 2: Rockwell hardness
  - ISO 2040:1972 Strontium chromate pigments for paints
- ISO 2041:2009 Mechanical vibration, shock and condition monitoring – Vocabulary
- ISO 2042:1973 Aircraft electrical circuit diagrams
- ISO 2043:1974 Unplasticized polyvinyl chloride (PVC) moulded fittings for elastic sealing ring type joints for use under pressure — Oven test [Withdrawn: replaced with ISO 580]
- ISO 2044:1974 Unplasticized polyvinyl chloride (PVC) moulded solvent-welded socket fittings for use with pressure pipe — Hydraulic internal pressure test
- ISO 2045:1988 Single sockets for unplasticized poly(vinyl chloride) (PVC-U) and chlorinated poly (vinyl chloride) (PVC-C) pressure pipes with elastic sealing ring type joints — Minimum depths of engagement [Withdrawn: replaced with ISO 1452-(2,3)]
- ISO 2046:1973 Gaseous breathing oxygen supplies for aircraft
- ISO 2047:1975 Information processing – Graphical representations for the control characters of the 7- bit coded character set
- ISO 2048:1990 Double-socket fittings for unplasticized poly(vinyl chloride) (PVC-U) pressure pipes with elastic sealing ring type joints — Minimum depths of engagement [Withdrawn: replaced with ISO 1452-3]
- ISO 2049:1996 Petroleum products — Determination of colour (ASTM scale)
- ISO 2050:1976 Potassium chloride for industrial use — Determination of potassium content — Flame emission spectrophotometric method [Withdrawn without replacement]
- ISO 2051:1976 Potassium chloride for industrial use — Determination of potassium content — Potassium tetraphenylborate gravimetric method [Withdrawn without replacement]
- ISO 2052:1976 Potassium chloride for industrial use — Determination of potassium content — Sodium tetraphenylborate titrimetric method [Withdrawn without replacement]
- ISO 2053:1976 Potassium chloride for industrial use — Determination of moisture content — Gravimetric method [Withdrawn without replacement]
- ISO 2056:1976 Moulded polyvinyl chloride (PVC) pipes and fittings — Determination of Vicat softening temperature [Withdrawn: replaced with ISO 2507, now ISO 2507-(1-2)]
- ISO 2057:1981 Agricultural tractors — Remote control hydraulic cylinders for trailed implements
- ISO 2058:1973 Raw styrene butadiene rubber (SBR) — Determination of volatile matter [Withdrawn: replaced with ISO 248]
- ISO 2059: Concrete and reinforced concrete — notation [Rejected draft]
- ISO 2060:1994 Textiles — Yarn from packages — Determination of linear density (mass per unit length) by the skein method
- ISO 2061:2015 Textiles — Determination of twist in yarns — Direct counting method
- ISO 2062:2009 Textiles — Yarns from packages — Determination of single-end breaking force and elongation at break using constant rate of extension (CRE) tester
- ISO 2063 Thermal spraying — Zinc, aluminium and their alloys
  - ISO 2063-1:2019 Part 1: Design considerations and quality requirements for corrosion protection systems
  - ISO 2063-2:2017 Part 2: Execution of corrosion protection systems
- ISO 2064:1996 Metallic and other inorganic coatings — Definitions and conventions concerning the measurement of thickness
- ISO 2065:1972 Textile machinery and accessories — Cylindrical tubes for tape yarns [Withdrawn: replaced with ISO 3914-3]
- ISO 2066:2004 Resilient floor coverings — Determination of moisture content of agglomerated composition cork
- ISO 2067:2019 Granulated cork, broken cork and crushed cork — Sampling for the determination of moisture content
- ISO 2068:1972 Barium chromate pigments for paints
- ISO 2069:1976 Aluminium oxide primarily used for the production of aluminium — Determination of calcium content — Flame atomic absorption method [Withdrawn without replacement]
- ISO 2070:1997 Aluminium oxide primarily used for the production of aluminium — Determination of calcium content [Withdrawn without replacement]
- ISO 2071:1976 Aluminium oxide primarily used for the production of aluminium — Determination of zinc content — Flame atomic absorption method [Withdrawn without replacement]
- ISO 2072:1981 Aluminium oxide primarily used for the production of aluminium — Determination of zinc content — PAN photometric method [Withdrawn without replacement]
- ISO 2073:1976 Aluminium oxide primarily used for the production of aluminium — Preparation of solution for analysis — Method by hydrochloric acid attack under pressure [Withdrawn without replacement]
- ISO 2074:2007 Plywood – Vocabulary
- ISO 2075:1972 Cutting netting to shape — Determination of the cutting rate [Withdrawn without replacement]
- ISO 2076:2021 Textiles – Man-made fibres – Generic names
- ISO 2077:1979 Pure expanded corkboard — Determination of the modulus of rupture by bending [Withdrawn without replacement]
- ISO 2078:1993 Textile glass — Yarns — Designation
- ISO 2079:1981 Surface treatment and metallic coatings — General classification of terms [Withdrawn: replaced with ISO 2080]
- ISO 2080:2022 Metallic and other inorganic coatings – Surface treatment, metallic and other inorganic coatings – Vocabulary
- ISO 2081:2018 Metallic and other inorganic coatings — Electroplated coatings of zinc with supplementary treatments on iron or steel
- ISO 2082:2017 Metallic and other inorganic coatings — Electroplated coatings of cadmium with supplementary treatments on iron or steel
- ISO 2083:1973 Gasoline — Determination of lead content — Volumetric chromate method [Withdrawn without replacement]
- ISO 2084:1974 Pipeline flanges for general use — Metric series — Mating dimensions [Withdrawn: replaced with ISO 7005-(1-3)]
- ISO 2085:2018 Anodizing of aluminium and its alloys — Check for continuity of thin anodic oxidation coatings — Copper sulfate test
- ISO/R 2091:1971 Hydraulic cylinders — Internal diameters and piston rod diameters — Metric series [Withdrawn without replacement]
- ISO 2092:1981 Light metals and their alloys — Code of designation based on chemical symbols [Withdrawn without replacement]
- ISO 2093:1986 Electroplated coatings of tin — Specification and test methods
- ISO 2094:1999 Textile floor coverings — Determination of thickness loss under dynamic loading
- ISO 2095:1977 Textile floor coverings — Determination of mass of effective pile per unit area that can be shorn away from the substrate [Withdrawn: replaced with ISO 8543]
- ISO 2096:1972 Glycerols for industrial use — Methods of sampling
- ISO 2097:1972 Glycerols for industrial use — Determination of water content — Karl Fischer method [Withdrawn without replacement]
- ISO 2098:1972 Glycerols for industrial use — Determination of ash — Gravimetric method [Withdrawn without replacement]
- ISO 2099:1972 Purified glycerol for industrial use — Determination of density at 20 degrees C [Withdrawn without replacement]
- ISO 2100:1987 Aircraft — Electrical connectors — Tests
- ISO/R 2101:1971 Aluminium and aluminium alloys — Shear test for rivet wire and rivets [Withdrawn without replacement]
- ISO 2103:1986 Loads due to use and occupancy in residential and public buildings [Withdrawn without replacement]
- ISO/R 2105:1971 Textile machinery and accessories — Tubes for draw-winders for man-made fibres [Withdrawn: replaced with ISO 3914-3]
- ISO 2106:2019 Anodizing of aluminium and its alloys — Determination of mass per unit area (surface density) of anodic oxidation coatings — Gravimetric method
- ISO 2107:2007 Aluminium and aluminium alloys — Wrought products — Temper designations
- ISO 2108:2005 Information and documentation – International standard book number (ISBN)
- ISO 2109:1975 Continuous mechanical handling equipment — Light duty belt conveyors for loose bulk materials
- ISO 2110:1989 Information technology – Data communication – 25-pole DTE/DCE interface connector and contact number assignments
- ISO 2111:1985 Data communication — Basic mode control procedures — Code independent information transfer [Withdrawn without replacement]
- ISO 2112:1990 Plastics — Aminoplastic moulding materials — Specification [Withdrawn: replaced with ISO 14527-(1-3) and ISO 14528-(1-3)]
- ISO 2113:1996 Reinforcement fibres — Woven fabrics — Basis for a specification
- ISO 2114:2000 Plastics (polyester resins) and paints and varnishes (binders) — Determination of partial acid value and total acid value
- ISO 2115:1996 Plastics — Polymer dispersions — Determination of white point temperature and minimum film-forming temperature
- ISO 2117 Terms and symbols for flight dynamics — Part 1: aircraft motion relative to the air [Draft renamed ISO 1151-1]
- ISO 2119:1972 Magnesium-zinc-zirconium alloy castings — Chemical composition [Withdrawn: replaced with ISO 3115]
- ISO 2120:1972 Liquid chlorine for industrial use — Determination of the content of chlorine by volume in the vaporized product
- ISO 2121:1972 Liquid chlorine for industrial use — Determination of water content — Gravimetric method
- ISO 2122:1972 Sodium and potassium silicates for industrial use — Preparation of solution of products not easily soluble in boiling water and determination of matter insoluble in water
- ISO 2123:1972 Sodium and potassium silicates for industrial use — Determination of dynamic viscosity [Withdrawn without replacement]
- ISO 2124:1972 Sodium and potassium silicates for industrial use — Determination of silica content — Titrimetric method [Withdrawn without replacement]
- ISO 2125:1975 Continuous mechanical handling equipment for loose bulk materials — Vibrating feeders and conveyors, shaking or reciprocating feeders and oscillating conveyors — Safety code [Withdrawn: replaced with ISO 8456]
- ISO 2126:1975 Office machines — Basic arrangement for the alphanumeric section of keyboards operated with both hands [Withdrawn: replaced with ISO 9995-(1,7)]
- ISO 2128:2010 Anodizing of aluminium and its alloys — Determination of thickness of anodic oxidation coatings — Non-destructive measurement by split-beam microscope
- ISO 2131:1972 Surface active agents — Simplified classification
- ISO 2132:1972 Offset duplicators — Attachment features of plates [Withdrawn without replacement]
- ISO 2133:1976 Stencils for duplicators — Minimum overprint and attachment features [Withdrawn without replacement]
- ISO 2135:2017 Anodizing of aluminium and its alloys — Accelerated test of light fastness of coloured anodic oxidation coatings using artificial light
- ISO/TR 2136:1977 Wrought aluminium and aluminium alloys — Rolled products — Mechanical properties [Withdrawn: replaced with ISO 6361-2]
- ISO 2137:2020 Petroleum products and lubricants — Determination of cone penetration of lubricating greases and petrolatum [Withdrawn without replacement]
- ISO 2139:1975 Continuous mechanical handling equipment for loose bulk materials — Oscillating conveyors and shaking or reciprocating feeders with tubular trough
- ISO 2140:1975 Continuous mechanical handling equipment for loose bulk materials — Apron conveyors
- ISO 2141:1972 Lifting hooks — General characteristics [Withdrawn without replacement]
- ISO 2142:1981 Wrought aluminium, magnesium and their alloys — Selection of specimens and test pieces for mechanical testing
- ISO 2143:2017 Anodizing of aluminium and its alloys — Estimation of loss of absorptive power of anodic oxidation coatings after sealing — Dye-spot test with prior acid treatment
- ISO 2144:2019 Paper, board, pulps and cellulose nanomaterials — Determination of residue (ash content) on ignition at 900 °C
- ISO 2145:1978 Documentation – Numbering of divisions and subdivisions in written documents
- ISO 2146:2010 Information and documentation – Registry services for libraries and related organizations
- ISO/R 2147:1971 Aluminium alloys — Sand cast test pieces — Mechanical properties [Withdrawn: replaced with ISO 3522]
- ISO 2148:1974 Continuous handling equipment – Nomenclature
- ISO 2149:1975 Continuous mechanical handling equipment for unit loads — Overhead monorail chain conveyors — Safety code [Withdrawn: replaced with ISO 7149]
- ISO 2150:1975 Continuous mechanical handling equipment for unit loads — Overhead twin rail chain conveyors (power and free) — Safety code [Withdrawn: replaced with ISO 7149]
- ISO 2151:2004 Acoustics – Noise test code for compressors and vacuum pumps – Engineering method (Grade 2)
- ISO 2155:1974 Aircraft — Fire-resisting electrical cables — Performance requirements
- ISO 2156:1974 Aircraft — Fire-resisting electrical cables — Methods of test
- ISO 2157:2016 Dentistry — Nominal diameters and designation code numbers for rotary instruments
- ISO 2160:1998 Petroleum products — Corrosiveness to copper — Copper strip test
- ISO 2161 UNJ threads for Aerospace-Inch Series [Rejected draft]
- ISO 2162 Technical product documentation – Springs
  - ISO 2162-1:1993 Part 1: Simplified representation
  - ISO 2162-2:1993 Part 2: Presentation of data for cylindrical helical compression springs [Withdrawn without replacement]
  - ISO 2162-3:1993 Part 3: Vocabulary [Withdrawn: replaced with ISO 26909]
- ISO 2163:1975 Industrial trucks — Wheels and castors — Vocabulary [Withdrawn: replaced with ISO 22877]
- ISO 2164:1975 Pulses — Determination of glycosidic hydrocyanic acid
- ISO 2165:1974 Ware potatoes — Guide to storage
- ISO 2166:1981 Carrots — Guide to storage
- ISO 2167:1991 Round-headed cabbage — Guide to cold storage and refrigerated transport
- ISO 2168:1974 Table grapes — Guide to cold storage
- ISO 2169:1981 Fruits and vegetables — Physical conditions in cold stores — Definitions and measurement
- ISO 2170:1980 Cereals and pulses — Sampling of milled products [Withdrawn: replaced with ISO 13690, later ISO 24333]
- ISO 2171:2007 Cereals, pulses and by-products – Determination of ash yield by incineration
- ISO 2172:1983 Fruit juice — Determination of soluble solids content — Pycnometric method
- ISO 2173:2003 Fruit and vegetable products — Determination of soluble solids — Refractometric method
- ISO 2174:1990 Surface active agents — Preparation of water with known calcium hardness
- ISO 2175:1981 Industrial wheels for non-powered equipment — Dimensions and nominal load capacities [Withdrawn: replaced with ISO 22883 and ISO 22884]
- ISO 2176:1995 Petroleum products — Lubricating grease — Determination of dropping point
- ISO 2177:2003 Metallic coatings — Measurement of coating thickness — Coulometric method by anodic dissolution
- ISO 2178:2016 Non-magnetic coatings on magnetic substrates — Measurement of coating thickness — Magnetic method
- ISO 2179:1986 Electroplated coatings of tin-nickel alloy — Specification and test methods
- ISO 2182 Tests for colour fastness of textiles – Sixth series [Draft renamed ISO/R 105-6]
- ISO 2184 Industrial castors — Dimensions of top plates
- ISO 2184-1:1972 Part 1: Oblong top-plates with 4 bolt holes [Withdrawn: replaced with ISO 22883 and ISO 22884]
- ISO 2185:1972 Muscovite mica blocks, thins and films — Visual classification [Withdrawn without replacement]
- ISO 2186:2007 Fluid flow in closed conduits – Connections for pressure signal transmissions between primary and secondary elements
- ISO 2187:1990 Spinning preparatory machinery, spinning and doubling (twisting) machinery – List of equivalent terms
- ISO 2189:1986 Expanded pure agglomerated cork — Determination of bulk density [Withdrawn without replacement]
- ISO 2190:2016 Granulated cork — Determination of moisture content
- ISO 2191:1972 Cork — Expanded pure agglomerated — Deformation under constant pressure [Withdrawn without replacement]
- ISO 2192:1984 Petroleum products — Determination of total sulfur content — Lamp method [Withdrawn without replacement]
- ISO 2194:1991 Industrial screens — Woven wire cloth, perforated plate and electroformed sheet — Designation and nominal sizes of openings
- ISO 2195:1972 Data interchange on rolled-up punched paper tape — General requirements [Withdrawn without replacement]
- ISO 2196:1975 Continuous mechanical handling equipment for unit loads — Single strand floor mounted truck conveyors (chain above floor) — Safety code [Withdrawn: replaced with ISO 7149]
- ISO 2197:1972 Sodium hydrogen carbonate for industrial use — List of methods of test and preparation of the test sample
- ISO 2198:1972 Sodium hydrogen carbonate for industrial use — Determination of sodium carbonate — Titrimetric method [Withdrawn without replacement]
- ISO 2199:1972 Sodium hydrogen carbonate for industrial use — Determination of sodium hydrogen carbonate content — Titrimetric method
- ISO 2200:1972 Sodium hydrogen carbonate for industrial use — Determination of moisture content — Gravimetric method [Withdrawn without replacement]
- ISO 2201:1972 Sodium hydrogen carbonate for industrial use — Determination of chloride content — Mercurimetric method [Withdrawn without replacement]
- ISO 2202:1972 Liquid chlorine for industrial use — Determination of water content using an electrolytic analyser [Withdrawn without replacement]
- ISO 2203:1973 Technical drawings – Conventional representation of gears
- ISO 2204:1979 Acoustics — Guide to International Standards on the measurement of airborne acoustical noise and evaluation of its effects on human beings [Withdrawn without replacement]
- ISO 2205:1975 Textile machinery and accessories – Drafting arrangements for spinning machines – Terminology
- ISO 2206:1987 Packaging — Complete, filled transport packages — Identification of parts when testing
- ISO 2207:1980 Petroleum waxes — Determination of congealing point
- ISO 2208:1973 Phenol, o-cresol, m-cresol and p-cresol for industrial use — Determination of crystallizing point after drying with a molecular sieve [Withdrawn without replacement]
- ISO 2209:1973 Liquid halogenated hydrocarbons for industrial use — Sampling
- ISO 2210:1972 Liquid halogenated hydrocarbons for industrial use — Determination of residue on evaporation [Withdrawn without replacement]
- ISO 2211:1973 Liquid chemical products — Measurement of colour in Hazen units (platinum-cobalt scale)
- ISO 2212:1972 Trichloroethylene for industrial use — Methods of test [Withdrawn without replacement]
- ISO 2213:1972 Perchloroethylene for industrial use — Methods of test [Withdrawn without replacement]
- ISO 2214:1972 Boric acid, boric oxide and Disodium tetraborates for industrial use — Determination of manganese content — Formaldehyde oxime photometric method [Withdrawn without replacement]
- ISO 2215:1972 Boric acid, boric oxide and Disodium tetraborates for industrial use — Determination of copper content — Zinc dibenzyldithiocarbamate photometric method [Withdrawn without replacement]
- ISO 2216:1972 Crude sodium borates for industrial use — Determination of sodium oxide and boric oxide contents — Volumetric method [Withdrawn without replacement]
- ISO 2217:1972 Crude sodium borates for industrial use — Determination of matter insoluble in alkaline medium and preparation of test solutions [Withdrawn without replacement]
- ISO 2218:1972 Crude sodium borates for industrial use — Determination of loss in mass after heating at 900 degrees C [Withdrawn without replacement]
- ISO 2219:2010 Thermal insulation products for buildings — Factory-made products of expanded cork (ICB) — Specification
- ISO 2220:1972 Hand finishing sticks and oil stones — Dimensions [Withdrawn: replaced with ISO 603-(1-16)]
- ISO 2221:1972 Formaldehyde solutions for industrial use — Limit test for inorganic chlorides [Withdrawn without replacement]
- ISO 2222:1972 Formaldehyde solutions for industrial use — Limit test for inorganic sulphates [Withdrawn without replacement]
- ISO 2223:1972 Formaldehyde solutions for industrial use — Limit test for heavy metals (excluding iron) [Withdrawn without replacement]
- ISO 2224:1972 Formaldehyde solutions for industrial use — Determination of ash [Withdrawn without replacement]
- ISO 2225:1972 Formaldehyde solutions for industrial use — Determination of acidity [Withdrawn without replacement]
- ISO 2226:1972 Formaldehyde solutions for industrial use — Determination of iron content — 2,2'- Bipyridyl photometric method [Withdrawn without replacement]
- ISO 2227:1972 Formaldehyde solutions for industrial use — Determination of formaldehyde content
- ISO 2228:1972 Formaldehyde solutions for industrial use — Determination of methanol content
- ISO 2229:1973 Equipment for the petroleum and natural gas industries — Steel pipe flanges, nominal sizes 1/2 to 24 in — Metric dimensions [Withdrawn: replaced with ISO 7005-(1-3)]
- ISO 2230:2002 Rubber products — Guidelines for storage
- ISO 2231:1989 Rubber- or plastics-coated fabrics — Standard atmospheres for conditioning and testing
- ISO 2232:1990 Round drawn wire for general purpose non-alloy steel wire ropes and for large diameter steel wire ropes — Specifications
- ISO 2233:2000 Packaging — Complete, filled transport packages and unit loads — Conditioning for testing
- ISO 2234:2000 Packaging — Complete, filled transport packages and unit loads — Stacking tests using a static load
- ISO 2235:1993 Abrasive sheets — Dimensions, tolerances and designation [Withdrawn: replaced with ISO 21948]
- ISO 2236:1991 Assembly tools for screws and nuts — Forged and tubular socket wrenches — Maximum outside head dimensions
- ISO 2238:2018 Machine bridge reamers
- ISO 2239:1972 Photography — Light sources for use in sensitometric exposure — Simulation of the spectral distribution of daylight [Withdrawn: replaced with ISO 7589]
- ISO 2240:2003 Photography – Colour reversal camera films – Determination of ISO speed
- ISO 2241:1972 Photography — Light sources for use in sensitometric exposure — Simulation of the spectral distribution of tungsten illumination [Withdrawn: replaced with ISO 7589]
- ISO 2242:1972 Photography — Light sources for use in sensitometric exposure — Simulation of the spectral distribution of photoflood illumination [Withdrawn: replaced with ISO 7589]
- ISO/R 2243:1972 Photography — Illumination conditions for viewing colour transparencies and their reproductions [Withdrawn: replaced with ISO 3664]
- ISO 2244:2000 Packaging — Complete, filled transport packages and unit loads — Horizontal impact tests
- ISO 2245:2006 Shaped insulating refractory products — Classification
- ISO 2246:1972 Dense shaped refractory products — Nomenclature of manufacturing processes [Withdrawn without replacement]
- ISO 2247:2000 Packaging — Complete, filled transport packages and unit loads — Vibration tests at fixed low frequency
- ISO 2248:1985 Packaging — Complete, filled transport packages — Vertical impact test by dropping
- ISO 2249:1973 Acoustics — Description and measurement of physical properties of sonic booms
- ISO 2250:2017 Finishing reamers for Morse and metric tapers, with cylindrical shanks and Morse taper shanks
- ISO 2251:1991 Lined antistatic rubber footwear — Specification [Withdrawn without replacement]
- ISO 2252:1983 Rubber footwear, lined industrial, for use at low temperatures [Withdrawn without replacement]
- ISO 2253:1999 Curry powder — Specification
- ISO 2254:2004 Cloves, whole and ground (powdered) — Specification
- ISO 2255:1996 Coriander (Coriandrum sativum L.), whole or ground (powdered) — Specification
- ISO 2256:1984 Dried mint (spearmint) (Mentha spicata Linnaeus syn. Mentha viridis Linnaeus) — Specification
- ISO 2257:1980 Office machines and printing machines used for information processing – Widths of fabric printing ribbons on spools
- ISO 2258:1976 Printing ribbons – Minimum markings to appear on containers
- ISO 2259:1972 Pots for propagation and transplantation made of peat and other plant material — Sampling [Withdrawn without replacement]
- ISO 2261:1994 Reciprocating internal combustion engines — Hand-operated control devices — Standard direction of motion
- ISO 2262:1984 General purpose thimbles for use with steel wire ropes — Specification
- ISO 2264:1972 Rolling bearings — Bearings with spherical outside surface and extended inner ring width [Withdrawn: replaced with ISO 9628]
- ISO/R 2265:1972 Rolling bearings with locating snap ring — Dimensions [Withdrawn: replaced with ISO 464]
- ISO 2266:1974 Textile machinery and accessories — Metal travellers for spinning and twisting [Withdrawn: replaced with ISO 96-(1-2)]
- ISO 2267:1986 Surface active agents — Evaluation of certain effects of laundering — Methods of preparation and use of unsoiled cotton control cloth
- ISO 2268:1972 Surface active agents (non-ionic) — Determination of polyethylene glycols and non-ionic active matter (adducts) — Weibull method
- ISO 2269:2000 Shipbuilding — Class A magnetic compasses, azimuth reading devices and binnacles — Tests and certification [Withdrawn: replaced with ISO 25862]
- ISO 2270:1989 Non-ionic surface active agents — Polyethoxylated derivatives — Iodometric determination of oxyethylene groups
- ISO 2271:1989 Surface active agents — Detergents — Determination of anionic-active matter by manual or mechanical direct two-phase titration procedure
- ISO 2272:1989 Surface active agents — Soaps — Determination of low contents of free glycerol by molecular absorption spectrometry
- ISO 2276:1972 Reciprocating internal combustion engines — Definition of right-hand and left-hand single bank engines [Withdrawn: replaced with ISO 1204]
- ISO 2277:1973 Static inventors for aircraft
- ISO 2281:1990 Horology – Water-resistant watches [Withdrawn: replaced with ISO 22810:2010]
- ISO 2283:2000 Long shank taps with nominal diameters from M3 to M24 and 1/8 in to 1 in — Reduced shank taps
- ISO 2284:2017 Hand taps for parallel and taper pipe threads — General dimensions and marking
- ISO 2285:2019 Rubber, vulcanized or thermoplastic — Determination of tension set under constant elongation, and of tension set, elongation and creep under constant tensile load
- ISO 2286 Rubber- or plastics-coated fabrics — Determination of roll characteristics
  - ISO 2286-1:2016 Part 1: Methods for determination of length, width and net mass
  - ISO 2286-2:2016 Part 2: Methods for determination of total mass per unit area, mass per unit area of coating and mass per unit area of substrate
  - ISO 2286-3:2016 Part 3: Method for determination of thickness
- ISO 2288:1997 Agricultural tractors and machines — Engine test code — Net power [Withdrawn without replacement]
- ISO 2289:1972 Rotary drilling equipment — Kellys [Withdrawn without replacement]
- ISO 2290:1972 Rotary drilling equipment — Upper and lower Kelly cocks [Withdrawn without replacement]
- ISO 2291:1980 Cocoa beans — Determination of moisture content (Routine method) [Withdrawn: replaced with ISO 2451]
- ISO 2292:2017 Cocoa beans — Sampling
- ISO 2293:1988 Meat and meat products — Enumeration of micro-organisms — Colony count technique at 30 degrees C (Reference method) [Withdrawn without replacement]
- ISO 2294:1974 Meat and meat products — Determination of total phosphorus content (Reference method) [Withdrawn: replaced with ISO 23776]
- ISO 2295:1974 Avocados — Guide for storage and transport
- ISO 2296:2018 Metal slitting saws with fine and coarse teeth — Metric series
- ISO 2297:1973 Chemical analysis of aluminium and its alloys — Complexometric determination of magnesium
- ISO/R 2298:1972 Alluminium and its alloys — Determination of chromium — Spectrophotometric method using diphenylcarbazide [Withdrawn without replacement]
- ISO 2299:1973 Sawn timber of broadleaved species — Defects — Classification

== ISO 2300 – ISO 2499 ==
- ISO 2300:1973 Sawn timber of broadleaved species — Defects — Terms and definitions
- ISO 2301:1973 Sawn timber of broadleaved species — Defects — Measurement
- ISO 2302:2020 Isobutene-isoprene rubber (IIR) — Evaluation procedure
- ISO 2303:2019 Isoprene rubber (IR) — Non-oil-extended, solution-polymerized types — Evaluation procedures
- ISO 2306:1972 Drills for use prior to tapping screw threads
- ISO 2307:2019 Fibre ropes — Determination of certain physical and mechanical properties
- ISO 2308:1972 Hooks for lifting freight containers of up to 30 tonnes capacity — Basic requirements
- ISO 2309:1980 Coke — Sampling [Withdrawn: replaced with ISO 18283]
- ISO 2311:1972 Electrolytic cathode copper [Withdrawn: replaced with ISO 431]
- ISO 2312:1972 Carbon tetrachloride for industrial use — Methods of test [Withdrawn without replacement]
- ISO 2313 Textiles — Determination of the recovery from creasing of a folded specimen of fabric by measuring the angle of recovery
- ISO 2313-1:2021 Part 1: Method of the horizontally folded specimen
- ISO 2313-2:2021 Part 2: Method of the vertically folded specimen
- ISO 2314:2009 Gas turbines — Acceptance tests
- ISO 2315:1980 Aircraft — Two- and four-pole sealed electromagnetic relays, 2 A and 3 A — Clearance and fixing dimensions
- ISO 2316:1973 Rolling bearings — Metric tapered roller bearings — Bearing width and cup width [Withdrawn: replaced with ISO 355]
- ISO 2318 Measurement of carbon variation in threads of hardened and tempered bolts, screws, and studs [Rejected draft]
- ISO 2320:2015 Fasteners — Prevailing torque steel nuts — Functional properties
- ISO 2321:2017 Rubber threads — Methods of test
- ISO 2322:2014 Styrene-butadiene rubber (SBR) — Emulsion- and solution-polymerized types — Evaluation procedures
- ISO 2324:1972 End mills and slot drills — Milling cutters with 7/24 taper shanks [Withdrawn: replaced with ISO 1641-3]
- ISO 2325:1986 Coke — Size analysis (Nominal top size 20 mm or less) [Withdrawn: replaced with ISO 728]
- ISO 2326:1972 Continuous mechanical handling equipment for loose bulk materials — Aeroslides
- ISO 2327:1972 Pneumatic handling appliances for loose bulk materials — Piping
- ISO 2328:2011 Fork-lift trucks — Hook-on type fork arms and fork arm carriages — Mounting dimensions
- ISO 2329:1983 Fork-lift trucks — Fork arms — Dimensions [Withdrawn without replacement]
- ISO 2330:2002 Fork-lift trucks — Fork arms — Technical characteristics and testing
- ISO 2331:1974 Fork lift trucks – Hook-on type fork arms – Vocabulary
- ISO 2332:2009 Agricultural tractors and machinery — Connection of implements via three-point linkage — Clearance zone around implement
- ISO 2333:1972 Shipbuilding — Cargo gear particulars book [Withdrawn without replacement]
- ISO 2335 Commercial refrigerated cabinets — Methods of test — Temperature Test [Draft renamed ISO 1992-3]
- ISO 2336:1980 Hand and machine hacksaw blades — Dimensions for lengths up to 450 mm and pitches up to 6,3 mm [Withdrawn without replacement]
- ISO 2337 [Draft merged into ISO 370]
- ISO 2338:1997 Parallel pins, of unhardened steel and austenitic stainless steel
- ISO 2339:1986 Taper pins, unhardened
- ISO 2340:1986 Clevis pins without head
- ISO 2341:1986 Clevis pins with head
- ISO 2342:2003 Slotted headless screws with shank
- ISO 2343:1972 Hexagon socket set screws — Metric series [Withdrawn: replaced with ISO 4026, ISO 4027, ISO 4028, and ISO 4029]
- ISO 2344:1998 Road vehicles — M14 x 1,25 spark-plugs with conical seating and their cylinder head housings [Withdrawn without replacement]
- ISO 2345:1994 Road vehicles — M18 x 1,5 spark-plugs with conical seating and their cylinder head housing [Withdrawn without replacement]
- ISO 2346:2001 Road vehicles — M14 x 1,25 compact spark-plugs with flat seating and 19 mm hexagon and their cylinder head housing [Withdrawn without replacement]
- ISO 2347:1994 Road vehicles — M14 x 1,25 compact spark-plugs with conical seating and their cylinder head housing [Withdrawn without replacement]
- ISO 2349:1973 Rolling bearings — Tapered rolling bearings — Sub-units — Tolerances — Metric series, normal tolerance class and tolerance class 6 — Inch series, tolerance class 4 (normal tolerance class) [Withdrawn: Replaced with ISO 492 and ISO 578 (now withdrawn)]
- ISO 2351 Assembly tools for screws and nuts — Machine-operated screwdriver bits
  - ISO 2351-1:2007 Part 1: Screwdriver bits for slotted head screws
  - ISO 2351-2:2002 Part 2: Screwdriver bits for cross-recessed head screws
- ISO 2352:2000 Assembly tools for screws and nuts — Spiral ratchet screwdriver ends — Dimensions [Withdrawn without replacement]
- ISO 2353:1972 Magnesium and its alloys — Determination of manganese in magnesium alloys containing zirconium, rare earths, thorium and silver — Periodate photometric method
- ISO 2354:1976 Magnesium alloys — Determination of insoluble zirconium — Alizarin sulphonate photometric method
- ISO 2355:1972 Chemical analysis of magnesium and its alloys — Determination of rare earths — Gravimetric method
- ISO 2358:1972 Prevailing torque-type steel hexagon locknuts — Dimensions — Metric series [Withdrawn: replaced with ISO 7040, ISO 7041, ISO 7042, ISO 7043, and ISO 7044]
- ISO 2359:1972 Prevailing torque-type steel hexagon locknuts — Dimensions — Inch series [Withdrawn without replacement]
- ISO 2360:2017 Non-conductive coatings on non-magnetic electrically conductive base metals — Measurement of coating thickness — Amplitude-sensitive eddy-current method
- ISO 2361:1982 Electrodeposited nickel coatings on magnetic and non-magnetic substrates — Measurement of coating thickness — Magnetic method
- ISO 2362:1972 Aluminium fluoride for industrial use — Determination of fluorine content — Modified Willard-Winter method [Withdrawn without replacement]
- ISO 2363:1972 Sulphuric acid and oleums for industrial use — Determination of oxides of nitrogen — 2,4- Xylenol spectrophotometric method [Withdrawn without replacement]
- ISO 2364:1972 Ammonium nitrate for industrial use — Determination of free acidity — Volumetric method [Withdrawn without replacement]
- ISO 2365:1972 Ammonium nitrate for industrial use — Measurement of pH value — Potentiometric method [Withdrawn without replacement]
- ISO 2366:1974 Cryolite, natural and artificial — Determination of sodium content — Flame emission and atomic absorption spectrophotometric methods
- ISO 2367:1972 Cryolite, natural and artificial — Determination of aluminium content — 8- Hydroxyquinoline gravimetric method
- ISO 2368:1972 Aluminium fluoride for industrial use — Determination of iron content — 1,10- Phenanthroline photometric method [Withdrawn without replacement]
- ISO 2369:1972 Aluminium fluoride for industrial use — Determination of silica content — Spectrophotometric method using the reduced silicomolybdic complex [Withdrawn without replacement]
- ISO 2370:2019 Textiles — Determination of fineness of flax fibres — Permeametric methods
- ISO 2371:1974 Field balancing equipment — Description and evaluation [Withdrawn without replacement]
- ISO 2372:1974 Mechanical vibration of machines with operating speeds from 10 to 200 rev/s — Basis for specifying evaluation standards [Withdrawn: replaced with ISO 10816-1]
- ISO 2373:1987 Mechanical vibration of certain rotating electrical machinery with shaft heights between 80 and 400 mm — Measurement and evaluation of the vibration severity [Withdrawn without replacement]
- ISO 2374:1983 Lifting appliances — Range of maximum capacities for basic models
- ISO/IEC TR 2375:2024 Information technology – Procedure for registration of escape sequences and coded character sets
- ISO 2376:2019 Anodizing of aluminium and its alloys — Determination of breakdown voltage and withstand voltage
- ISO 2377:1972 Magnesium alloy sand castings — Reference test bar [Withdrawn without replacement]
- ISO 2378:1972 Aluminium alloy chill castings — Reference test bar [Withdrawn without replacement]
- ISO 2379:1972 Aluminium alloy sand castings — Reference test bar [Withdrawn without replacement]
- ISO 2380:1979 Screwdriver blades for slotted head screws [Withdrawn without replacement]
- ISO 2381:1972 Continuous mechanical handling equipment for unit loads — Single strand floor truck conveyors (chain below floor) — Safety code [Withdrawn: replaced with ISO 7149]
- ISO/IEC 2382:2015 Information technology – Vocabulary
  - ISO/IEC 2382-36:2019 Part 36: Learning, education and training
  - ISO/IEC 2382-37:2017 Part 37: Biometrics
- ISO 2383 Data processing — Vocabulary — Part 04: Organization of data [Draft merged into ISO 2382]
- ISO 2384:1977 Documentation – Presentation of translations
- ISO 2385:2020 Packed cork — Virgin cork, raw reproduction cork, burnt cork, boiled reproduction cork and raw cork waste — Sampling to determine moisture content
- ISO 2386:2019 Packed cork — Virgin cork, raw reproduction cork, burnt cork, boiled reproduction cork and raw cork waste — Determination of moisture content
- ISO 2387:1972 Continuous mechanical handling equipment for loose bulk materials — Mobile belt conveyors — Safety code [Withdrawn: replaced with ISO 7149]
- ISO 2388:1972 Continuous mechanical handling equipment for unit loads — Mobile belt conveyors (canvas, rubber, plastic, etc.) — Safety code [Withdrawn: replaced with ISO 7149]
- ISO 2389:1972 Continuous mechanical handling equipment for loose bulk materials — Picking table conveyors — Safety code [Withdrawn: replaced with ISO 7149]
- ISO 2390:1972 Continuous mechanical handling equipment for loose bulk materials — Apron conveyors — Safety code [Withdrawn: replaced with ISO 7149]
- ISO 2391:1972 Continuous mechanical handling equipment for loose bulk materials — Scraper conveyors and "en masse" conveyors — Safety code [Withdrawn: replaced with ISO 7149]
- ISO 2392:1972 Continuous mechanical handling equipment for loose bulk materials — Hydraulic conveyors — Safety code [Withdrawn: replaced with ISO 7149]
- ISO 2393:2014 Rubber test mixes — Preparation, mixing and vulcanization — Equipment and procedures
- ISO 2394:2015 General principles on reliability for structures
- ISO 2395:1990 Test sieves and test sieving – Vocabulary
- ISO 2398:2016 Rubber hoses, textile-reinforced, for compressed air — Specification
- ISO 2400:2012 Non-destructive testing — Ultrasonic testing — Specification for calibration block No. 1
- ISO 2401:2018 Welding consumables — Covered electrodes — Determination of the efficiency, metal recovery and deposition coefficient
- ISO 2402:1972 Shell reamers with taper bore (taper bore 1 : 30 (included)) with slot drive and arbors for shell reamers
- ISO 2403:2021 Textiles — Cotton fibres — Determination of micronaire value
- ISO 2404:1986 Cinematography — Six-track magnetic sound records on 70 mm striped release prints — Locations and dimensions
- ISO 2405:1972 Recommended practice for radiographic inspection of fusion welded butt joints for steel plates 50 to 200 mm thick [Withdrawn: replaced with ISO 1106-2]
- ISO 2406:1974 Continuous mechanical handling equipment — Mobile and portable conveyors — Constructional specifications
- ISO 2407:1997 Test conditions for internal cylindrical grinding machines with horizontal spindle — Testing of accuracy
- ISO 2408:2017 Steel wire ropes — Requirements
- ISO 2409:2020 Paints and varnishes — Cross-cut test
- ISO 2410:1973 Household refrigerators — Methods of test for the information of the consumer [Withdrawn without replacement]
- ISO 2411:2017 Rubber- or plastics-coated fabrics — Determination of coating adhesion
- ISO 2412:1982 Shipbuilding — Colours of indicator lights
- ISO 2415:2004 Forged shackles for general lifting purposes — Dee shackles and bow shackles
- ISO 2416:1992 Passenger cars — Mass distribution
- ISO 2417:2016 Leather — Physical and mechanical tests — Determination of the static absorption of water
- ISO 2418:2017 Leather — Chemical, physical and mechanical and fastness tests — Sampling location
- ISO 2419:2012 Leather — Physical and mechanical tests — Sample preparation and conditioning
- ISO 2420:2017 Leather — Physical and mechanical tests — Determination of apparent density and mass per unit area
- ISO 2421:2003 Coated abrasives — Cylindrical sleeves
- ISO 2422:1986 Truncated cone abrasive sleeves — Dimensions and designation [Withdrawn without replacement]
- ISO 2423:1982 Acceptance conditions for radial drilling machines with the arm adjustable in height — Testing of accuracy
- ISO 2424:2007 Textile floor coverings — Vocabulary
- ISO 2425:2010 Hydrometry – Measurement of liquid flow in open channels under tidal conditions
- ISO 2426 Plywood — Classification by surface appearance
- ISO 2426-1:2020 Part 1: General
- ISO 2426-2:2020 Part 2: Hardwood
- ISO 2426-3:2020 Part 3: Softwood
- ISO 2426-4:2020 Part 4: Palm-plywood
- ISO 2427:1974 Plywood — Veneer plywood with rotary cut veneer for general use — Classification by appearance of panels with outer veneers of beech [Withdrawn: replaced with ISO 2426-(2-3)]
- ISO 2428:1974 Plywood — Veneer plywood with rotary cut veneer for general use — Classification by appearance of panels with outer veneers of birch [Withdrawn: replaced with ISO 2426-(2-3)]
- ISO 2429:1974 Plywood — Veneer plywood with rotary cut veneer for general use — Classification by appearance of panels with outer veneers of broadleaved species of tropical Africa [Withdrawn: replaced with ISO 2426-(2-3)]
- ISO 2430:1974 Plywood — Veneer plywood with rotary cut veneer for general use — Classification by appearance of panels with outer veneers of poplar [Withdrawn: replaced with ISO 2426-(2-3)]
- ISO 2431:2019 Paints and varnishes — Determination of flow time by use of flow cups
- ISO 2433:1999 Machine tools — Test conditions for external cylindrical and universal grinding machines with a movable table — Testing of accuracy
- ISO 2434:1973 Compressed non-breathing air for use in aircraft
- ISO 2435:1973 Nitrogen for use in aircraft
- ISO 2436:1973 Heat-resisting equipment wires for aircraft — Methods of test
- ISO 2437:1972 Recommended practice for the X-ray inspection of fusion welded butt joints for aluminium and its alloys and magnesium and its alloys 5 to 50 mm thick [Withdrawn without replacement]
- ISO 2438:1981 Rubber latex, synthetic — Codification [Withdrawn without replacement]
- ISO 2439:2008 Flexible cellular polymeric materials — Determination of hardness (indentation technique)
- ISO 2440:2019 Flexible and rigid cellular polymeric materials — Accelerated ageing tests
- ISO 2441:1975 Pipeline flanges for general use — Shapes and dimensions of pressure-tight surfaces [Withdrawn: replaced with ISO 7005-(1-3)]
- ISO 2443:1980 Vines — Root stock, cuttings, scions and plants — Specification [Withdrawn without replacement]
- ISO 2444:1988 Joints in building – Vocabulary [Withdrawn: replaced with ISO 6707-1]
- ISO 2445:1972 Joints in building — Fundamental principles for design
- ISO 2446:2008 Milk — Determination of fat content [Withdrawn: replaced with ISO 19662]
- ISO 2447:1998 Fruit and vegetable products — Determination of tin content
- ISO 2448:1998 Fruit and vegetable products — Determination of ethanol content
- ISO 2449:1974 Milk and liquid milk products — Density hydrometers for use in products with a surface tension of approximately 45 mN/m [Withdrawn without replacement]
- ISO 2450:2008 Cream — Determination of fat content — Gravimetric method (Reference method) [Withdrawn: replaced with ISO 23318]
- ISO 2451:2017 Cocoa beans — Specification and quality requirements
- ISO 2452 Data processing — Vocabulary — Part 05: Representation of data [Draft merged into ISO 2382]
- ISO 2453:2020 Rubber, raw styrene-butadiene, emulsion-polymerized — Determination of bound styrene content — Refractive index method
- ISO 2454:1995 Rubber products — Determination of zinc content — EDTA titrimetric method [Withdrawn without replacement]
- ISO 2455 Data processing — Vocabulary — [Draft merged into ISO 2382]
- ISO 2456:1986 Surface active agents — Water used as a solvent for tests — Specification and test methods
- ISO 2457:1976 Solid wood parquet — Classification of beech strips [Withdrawn: replaced with ISO 4562]
- ISO 2458:1975 End-suction centrifugal pumps (rating 16 bar) — Test Code [Rejected draft]
- ISO 2460:1973 Sodium hydrogen carbonate for industrial use — Determination of iron content — 1,10- Phenanthroline photometric method
- ISO 2461:1973 Sodium hydrogen carbonate for industrial use — Determination of matter insoluble in water [Withdrawn without replacement]
- ISO 2462:1973 Sodium chlorate for industrial use — Determination of moisture content — Gravimetric method
- ISO 2463:1973 Sodium chlorate for industrial use — Determination of chloride content — Mercurimetric method [Withdrawn without replacement]
- ISO 2464:1973 Crude glycerine for industrial use — Calculation of Matter (Organic) Non-Glycerol (MONG) [Withdrawn without replacement]
- ISO 2465:1973 Glycerols for industrial use — Determination of arsenic content — Silver diethyldithiocarbamate photometric method [Withdrawn without replacement]
- ISO 2466:1973 Potassium hydroxide for industrial use — Sampling — Test sample — Preparation of the main solution for carrying out certain determinations [Withdrawn without replacement]
- ISO 2467:2004 Cinematography — Image area produced by 65 mm/5 perforation motion-picture camera aperture and maximum projectable image area on 70 mm/5 perforation motion-picture prints — Positions and dimensions
- ISO 2469:2014 Paper, board and pulps — Measurement of diffuse radiance factor (diffuse reflectance factor)
- ISO 2470 Paper, board and pulps — Measurement of diffuse blue reflectance factor
  - ISO 2470-1:2016 Part 1: Indoor daylight conditions (ISO brightness)
  - ISO 2470-2:2016 Part 2: Outdoor daylight conditions (D65 brightness)
- ISO 2471:2008 Paper and board — Determination of opacity (paper backing) — Diffuse reflectance method
- ISO 2472:1975 Ebonite — Determination of tensile strength and elongation at break [Withdrawn without replacement]
- ISO 2473:1972 Ebonite — Determination of cross-breaking strength [Withdrawn without replacement]
- ISO 2474:1972 Ebonite — Determination of crushing strength [Withdrawn without replacement]
- ISO 2475:2011 Chloroprene rubber (CR) — General-purpose types — Evaluation procedure
- ISO 2476:2014 Butadiene rubber (BR) — Solution-polymerized types — Evaluation procedures
- ISO 2477:2005 Shaped insulating refractory products — Determination of permanent change in dimensions on heating
- ISO 2478:1987 Dense shaped refractory products — Determination of permanent change in dimensions on heating
- ISO 2479:1972 Sodium chloride for industrial use — Determination of matter insoluble in water or in acid and preparation of principal solutions for other determinations
- ISO 2480:1972 Sodium chloride for industrial use — Determination of sulphate content — Barium sulphate gravimetric method
- ISO 2481:1973 Sodium chloride for industrial use — Determination of halogens, expressed as chlorine — Mercurimetric method
- ISO 2482:1973 Sodium chloride for industrial use — Determination of calcium and magnesium contents — EDTA complexometric methods
- ISO 2483:1973 Sodium chloride for industrial use — Determination of the loss of mass at 110 degrees C
- ISO 2484:1973 Potassium sulphate for industrial use — Determination of potassium content — Flame emission spectrophotometric method [Withdrawn without replacement]
- ISO 2485:1973 Potassium sulphate for industrial use — Determination of potassium content — Gravimetric method as potassium tetraphenylborate [Withdrawn without replacement]
- ISO 2486:1973 Potassium sulphate for industrial use — Determination of potassium content — Gravimetric method as potassium tetraphenylborate [Withdrawn without replacement]
- ISO 2487:1973 Potassium sulphate for industrial use — Determination of sulphate content — Barium sulphate gravimetric method [Withdrawn without replacement]
- ISO 2488:1973 Potassium sulphate for industrial use — Determination of chloride content — Mercurimetric method [Withdrawn without replacement]
- ISO 2489:1973 Potassium sulphate for industrial use — Determination of acidity to methyl orange [Withdrawn without replacement]
- ISO 2490:2007 Solid (monobloc) gear hobs with tenon drive or axial keyway, 0,5 to 40 module — Nominal dimensions
- ISO 2491:1974 Thin parallel keys and their corresponding keyways (Dimensions in millimetres) [Withdrawn without replacement]
- ISO 2492:1974 Thin taper keys with or without gib head and their corresponding keyways (Dimensions in millimetres) [Withdrawn without replacement]
- ISO 2493 Paper and board — Determination of bending resistance
  - ISO 2493-1:2010 Part 1: Constant rate of deflection
  - ISO 2493-2:2011 Part 2: Taber-type tester
- ISO 2494:1974 Paper and board — Recommended procedure for the determination of roughness — Constant-pressure air-flow method [Withdrawn: replaced with ISO 8791-(2-3)]
- ISO 2495:1995 Iron blue pigments — Specifications and methods of test
- ISO 2496:1973 secButyl alcohol for industrial use — List of methods of test [Withdrawn without replacement]
- ISO 2497:1973 Methyl ethyl ketone for industrial use — List of methods of test [Withdrawn without replacement]
- ISO 2498:1974 Methyl ethyl ketone for industrial use — Examination for residual odour [Withdrawn without replacement]
- ISO 2499:1974 isoButyl methyl ketone for industrial use — List of methods of test [Withdrawn without replacement]

== ISO 2500 – ISO 2649 ==
- ISO 2500:1974 isoAmyl ethyl ketone for industrial use — List of methods of test [Withdrawn without replacement]
- ISO 2501:1973 Methyl ethyl ketone, isobutyl methyl ketone and isoamyl ethyl ketone for industrial use — Determination of alcoholic impurities — Volumetric method [Withdrawn without replacement]
- ISO 2502 Gas welding equipment — Safety code [Rejected draft]
- ISO 2503:2009 Gas welding equipment — Pressure regulators and pressure regulators with flow-metering devices for gas cylinders used in welding, cutting and allied processes up to 300 bar (30 MPa)
- ISO 2504:1973 Radiography of welds and viewing conditions for films — Utilization of recommended patterns of image quality indicators (I.Q.I.) [Withdrawn without replacement]
- ISO 2505:2005 Thermoplastics pipes — Longitudinal reversion — Test method and parameters
- ISO 2506:1981 Polyethylene pipes (PE) — Longitudinal reversion — Test methods and specification [Withdrawn: replaced with ISO 2505]
- ISO 2507 Thermoplastics pipes and fittings — Vicat softening temperature
  - ISO 2507-1:1995 Thermoplastics pipes and fittings — Vicat softening temperature — Part 1: General test method
  - ISO 2507-2:1995 Part 2: Test conditions for unplasticized poly(vinyl chloride) (PVC-U) or chlorinated poly(vinyl chloride) (PVC-C) pipes and fittings and for high impact resistance poly (vinyl chloride) (PVC-HI) pipes
- ISO 2508:1981 Unplasticized polyvinyl chloride (PVC) pipes — Water absorption — Determination and specification [Withdrawn without replacement]
- ISO 2509:1989 Sound-absorbing expanded pure agglomerated cork in tiles
- ISO 2510:1989 Sound-reducing composition cork in tiles [Withdrawn without replacement]
- ISO 2511:1974 Furfural for industrial use — List of methods of test [Withdrawn without replacement]
- ISO 2512:1974 Furfural for industrial use — Determination of total carbonyl compounds — Volumetric method [Withdrawn without replacement]
- ISO 2513:1974 Acetaldehyde for industrial use — Determination of density at 15 degrees C [Withdrawn without replacement]
- ISO 2514:1974 Acetaldehyde for industrial use — Determination of water content — Karl Fischer method [Withdrawn without replacement]
- ISO 2515:1973 Ammonium hydrogen carbonate for industrial use (including foodstuffs) — Determination of ammoniacal nitrogen content — Volumetric method after distillation [Withdrawn without replacement]
- ISO 2516:1973 Ammonium hydrogen carbonate for industrial use (including foodstuffs) — Determination of total alkalinity — Volumetric method [Withdrawn without replacement]
- ISO 2517:1974 Diacetone alcohol for industrial use — List of methods of test [Withdrawn without replacement]
- ISO 2518:1974 Diacetone alcohol and hexylene glycol for industrial use — Test for miscibility with water [Withdrawn without replacement]
- ISO 2519:1974 Hexylene glycol for industrial use — List of methods of test [Withdrawn without replacement]
- ISO 2520:1974 Tritolyl phosphate for industrial use — List of methods of test [Withdrawn without replacement]
- ISO 2521:1974 Tritolyl phosphate for industrial use — Determination of acidity to phenol red — Volumetric method [Withdrawn without replacement]
- ISO 2522:1974 Tritolyl phosphate for industrial use — Determination of apparent free phenols content — Volumetric method [Withdrawn without replacement]
- ISO 2523:1974 Adipate esters for industrial use — List of methods of test [Withdrawn without replacement]
- ISO 2524:1974 Adipate esters for industrial use — Measurement of colour after heat treatment [Withdrawn without replacement]
- ISO 2525:1974 Adipate esters for industrial use — Determination of acidity to phenolphthalein — Volumetric method [Withdrawn without replacement]
- ISO 2526:1974 Adipate esters for industrial use — Determination of ash — Gravimetric method [Withdrawn without replacement]
- ISO 2527:1974 Adipate esters for industrial use — Determination of ester content — Volumetric method [Withdrawn without replacement]
- ISO 2528:2017 Sheet materials — Determination of water vapour transmission rate (WVTR) — Gravimetric (dish) method
- ISO 2529:1973 Aircraft — Zones, access doors and panels — Referencing system [Withdrawn without replacement]
- ISO 2530:1975 Keyboard for international information processing interchange using the ISO 7- bit coded character set — Alphanumeric area [Withdrawn: replaced with ISO 9995-(1,7)]
- ISO 2531:2009 Ductile iron pipes, fittings, accessories and their joints for water applications
- ISO 2532:1974 Steel wire ropes – Vocabulary
- ISO 2533:1975 Standard Atmosphere
- ISO 2534:2020 Road vehicles — Engine test code — Gross power
- ISO 2535:2001 Plastics — Unsaturated-polyester resins — Measurement of gel time at ambient temperature
- ISO 2536:1974 Unplasticized polyvinyl chloride (PVC) pressure pipes and fittings, metric series — Dimensions of flanges [Withdrawn without replacement]
- ISO 2537:2007 Hydrometry – Rotating-element current-meters
- ISO 2538 Geometrical product specifications (GPS) – Wedges
  - ISO 2538-1:2014 Part 1: Series of angles and slopes
  - ISO 2538-2:2014 Part 2: Dimensioning and tolerancing
- ISO 2539:1974 Numerical control of machines — Punched tape variable block format for contouring and contouring/positioning [Withdrawn: replaced with ISO 6983-1]
- ISO 2540:2016 Centre drills for centre holes with protecting chamfer — Type B
- ISO 2541:2016 Centre drills for centre holes with radius form — Type R
- ISO 2542:1980 Internal combustion engines — Spark plug ignition — Terminology [Withdrawn: replaced with ISO 6518-1]
- ISO 2543:1973 Copper and copper alloys — Determination of manganese — Spectrophotometric method [Withdrawn without replacement]
- ISO 2544:1975 Textile machinery and accessories — Warping machinery — Preparation of warp for weaving — Vocabulary [Withdrawn without replacement]
- ISO 2546:1973 Seamless plain end tubes made from unalloyed steel and without quality requirements [Withdrawn without replacement]
- ISO 2547:1973 Welded plain end tubes made from unalloyed steel and without quality requirements [Withdrawn without replacement]
- ISO 2548:1973 Centrifugal, mixed flow and axial pumps — Code for acceptance tests — Class C [Withdrawn: replaced with ISO 9906]
- ISO 2549:1972 Textile floor coverings — Hand-knotted carpets — Determination of tuft leg length above the woven ground
- ISO 2550:1972 Textile floor coverings — Hand-made carpets — Determination of types of knots
- ISO 2551:2020 Textile floor coverings and textile floor coverings in tile form — Determination of dimensional changes due to the effects of varied water and heat conditions and distortion out of plane
- ISO 2553:2019 Welding and allied processes – Symbolic representation on drawings – Welded joints
- ISO 2554:1997 Plastics — Unsaturated polyester resins — Determination of hydroxyl value
- ISO 2555:2018 Plastics — Resins in the liquid state or as emulsions or dispersions — Determination of apparent viscosity using a single cylinder type rotational viscometer method
- ISO 2556:1974 Plastics — Determination of the gas transmission rate of films and thin sheets under atmospheric pressure — Manometric method [Withdrawn without replacement]
- ISO 2557 Plastics — Amorphous thermoplastics — Preparation of test specimens with a specified maximum reversion
  - ISO 2557-1:1989 Part 1: Bars [Withdrawn without replacement]
  - ISO 2557-2:1986 Part 2: Plates [Withdrawn without replacement]
- ISO 2558:2010 Textile glass chopped-strand mats for reinforcement of plastics — Determination of time of dissolution of the binder in styrene
- ISO 2559:2011 Textile glass — Mats (made from chopped or continuous strands) — Designation and basis for specifications
- ISO 2560:2020 Welding consumables — Covered electrodes for manual metal arc welding of non-alloy and fine grain steels — Classification
- ISO 2561:2012 Plastics — Determination of residual styrene monomer in polystyrene (PS) and impact-resistant polystyrene (PS-I) by gas chromatography
- ISO 2562:1973 Modular units for machine tool construction — Slide units
- ISO 2563:2009 Aircraft ducting and piping — Profile dimensions for flanges of V-band couplings
- ISO 2564 Conveyor chains, attachments and chain wheels — Part 2: Chain wheels [Draft renamed ISO 1977-2]
- ISO 2565 Conveyor chains, attachments and chain wheels — Part 3: Attachments — Metric series [Draft renamed ISO 1977-3]
- ISO 2566 Steel — Conversion of elongation values
  - ISO 2566-1:2021 Part 1: Carbon and low-alloy steels
  - ISO 2566-2:2021 Part 2: Austenitic steels
- ISO 2568:1988 Hand- and machine-operated circular screwing dies and hand-operated die stocks
- ISO 2569:1994 Cork stoppers — Vocabulary [Withdrawn without replacement]
- ISO 2572:1982 Textile machinery and accessories — Card gauges
- ISO 2573:1977 Tensile testing systems — Determination of K-value [Withdrawn without replacement]
- ISO 2574:1994 Aircraft – Electrical cables – Identification marking
- ISO 2575:2021 Road vehicles – Symbols for controls, indicators and tell-tales
- ISO 2576:1972 Chemical analysis of zinc alloys — Polarographic determination of lead and cadmium in zinc alloys containing copper [Withdrawn without replacement]
- ISO 2577:2007 Plastics — Thermosetting moulding materials — Determination of shrinkage
- ISO 2578:1993 Plastics — Determination of time-temperature limits after prolonged exposure to heat
- ISO 2579 Plastics — Instrumental evaluation of color difference [Rejected draft]
- ISO 2580 Plastics — Acrylonitrile-butadiene-styrene (ABS) moulding and extrusion materials
  - ISO 2580-1:2002 Part 1: Designation system and basis for specifications [Withdrawn: replaced with ISO 19062-1]
  - ISO 2580-2:2003 Part 2: Preparation of test specimens and determination of properties [Withdrawn: replaced with ISO 19062-2]
- ISO 2581:1975 Rigid cellular plastics — Determination of apparent thermal conductivity by means of a heat-flow meter [Withdrawn: replaced with ISO 8301]
- ISO 2582:1978 Cork and cork products — Determination of thermal conductivity — Hot plate method [Withdrawn without replacement]
- ISO 2583:1972 Tool shanks and equipment with 7/24 tapers — Collar dimensions [Withdrawn: replaced with ISO 297]
- ISO 2584:2016 Cylindrical cutters with plain bore and key drive — Metric series
- ISO 2585:1972 Slotting cutters with plain bore and key drive — Metric series
- ISO 2586:1985 Shell end mills with plain bore and tenon drive — Metric series
- ISO 2587:1972 Side and face milling cutters with plain bore and key drive — Metric series
- ISO 2588:2014 Leather — Sampling — Number of items for a gross sample
- ISO 2589:2016 Leather — Physical and mechanical tests — Determination of thickness
- ISO 2590:1973 General method for the determination of arsenic — Silver diethyldithiocarbamate photometric method [Withdrawn without replacement]
- ISO 2591 Test sieving
  - ISO 2591-1:1988 Part 1: Methods using test sieves of woven wire cloth and perforated metal plate
- ISO 2592:2017 Petroleum and related products — Determination of flash and fire points — Cleveland open cup method
- ISO/IEC 2593:2000 Information technology – Telecommunications and information exchange between systems – 34-pole DTE/DCE interface connector mateability dimensions and contact number assignments
- ISO 2594:1972 Building drawings — Projection methods [Withdrawn: replaced with ISO 128-43]
- ISO 2595:1973 Building drawings — Dimensioning of production drawings — Representation of manufacturing and work sizes [Withdrawn: replaced with ISO 129, now ISO 129-1]
- ISO 2596:2006 Iron ores — Determination of hygroscopic moisture in analytical samples — Gravimetric, Karl Fischer and mass-loss methods
- ISO 2597 Iron ores — Determination of total iron content
  - ISO 2597-1:2006 Part 1: Titrimetric method after tin(II) chloride reduction
  - ISO 2597-2:2019 Part 2: Titrimetric methods after titanium(III) chloride reduction
- ISO 2598 Iron ores — Determination of silicon content
  - ISO 2598-1:1992 Part 1: Gravimetric methods
  - ISO 2598-2:1992 Part 2: Reduced molybdosilicate spectrophotometric method
- ISO 2599:2003 Iron ores — Determination of phosphorus content — Titrimetric method
- ISO 2600 Iron ores — Sampling — Incremental method [Rejected draft]
- ISO 2601 Iron ores — Preparation of samples [Rejected draft]
- ISO 2602:1980 Statistical interpretation of test results – Estimation of the mean – Confidence interval
- ISO 2603:2016 Simultaneous interpreting — Permanent booths — Requirements [Withdrawn: replaced with ISO 17651-1]
- ISO 2604 Steel products for pressure purposes — Quality requirements
  - ISO 2604-1:1975 Part 1: Forgings [Withdrawn: replaced with ISO 9327-(1-5)]
  - ISO 2604-2:1975 Part 2: Wrought [Withdrawn: replaced with ISO 9329-(1-4)]
  - ISO 2604-3:1975 Part 3: Electric resistance and induction-welded tubes [Withdrawn: replaced with ISO 9330-(1-3)]
  - ISO 2604-4:1975 Part 4: Electric resistance and induction-welded tubes [Withdrawn: replaced with ISO 9328-(1-5)]
  - ISO 2604-5:1978 Part 5: Longitudinally welded austenitic stainless steel tubes [Withdrawn: replaced with ISO 9330-6]
  - ISO 2604-6:1978 Part 6: Submerged arc longitudinally or spirally welded steel tubes [Withdrawn: replaced with ISO 9330-1]
  - ISO/TR 2604-7:1986 Part 7: Carbon steel plate (thicknesses over 100 to 250 mm) [Withdrawn: replaced with ISO 9328-(1-5)]
  - ISO 2604-8:1985 Part 8: Plates of weldable fine grain steels with high proof stress supplied in the normalized or quenched and tempered condition (thicknesses from 3 to 70 mm) [Withdrawn: replaced with ISO 9328-(1-5)]
- ISO 2605 Steel products for pressure purposes — Derivation and verification of elevated temperature properties [Original draft renamed ISO 2604-2]
  - ISO 2605-1:1976 Part 1: Yield or proof stress of carbon and low alloy steel products [Withdrawn without replacement]
  - ISO 2605-2:1976 Part 2: Proof stress of austenitic steel products [Withdrawn without replacement]
  - ISO 2605-3:1985 Part 3: An alternative procedure for deriving the elevated temperature yield or proof stress properties when data are limited
- ISO 2606 [Draft renamed ISO 2604-3]
- ISO 2607 [Draft renamed ISO 2604-4]
- ISO 2608 Carbon and low-alloy steels — procedure for deriving minimum proof stress values
- ISO 2624:1990 Copper and copper alloys — Estimation of average grain size
- ISO 2625:1973 Copper and copper alloys — Reverse bend testing of wire [Withdrawn: replaced with ISO 7801]
- ISO 2626:1973 Copper — Hydrogen embrittlement test
- ISO 2627:1973 Copper and copper alloys — Simple torsion testing of wire [Withdrawn: replaced with ISO 7800]
- ISO 2628:1973 Basic mode control procedures – Complements
- ISO 2629:1973 Basic mode control procedures – Conversational information message transfer
- ISO/TR 2630:1978 Rubbers, raw — Sampling for inspection by variables [Withdrawn: replaced with ISO 1795]
- ISO 2631 Mechanical vibration and shock — Evaluation of human exposure to whole-body vibration
  - ISO 2631-1:1997 Part 1: General requirements
  - ISO 2631-2:2003 Part 2: Vibration in buildings (1 Hz to 80 Hz)
  - ISO 2631-3:1985 Part 3: Evaluation of exposure to whole-body z-axis vertical vibration in the frequency range 0,1 to 0,63 Hz [Withdrawn: replaced with ISO 2631-1]
  - ISO 2631-4:2001 Part 4: Guidelines for the evaluation of the effects of vibration and rotational motion on passenger and crew comfort in fixed-guideway transport systems
  - ISO 2631-5:2018 Part 5: Method for evaluation of vibration containing multiple shocks
- ISO 2632 Roughness comparison specimens
  - ISO 2632-1:1985 Part 1: Turned, ground, bored, milled, shaped and planed [Withdrawn without replacement]
  - ISO 2632-2:1985 Part 2: Spark-eroded, shot-blasted and grit-blasted, and polished [Withdrawn without replacement]
  - ISO 2632-3:1979 Part 3: Cast surfaces [Withdrawn without replacement]
- ISO 2633:1974 Determination of imposed floor loads in production buildings and warehouses [Withdrawn without replacement]
- ISO 2634 Current codes for designing reinforcements of openings [Rejected draft]
- ISO 2635:2003 Aircraft — Conductors for general purpose aircraft electrical cables and aerospace applications — Dimensions and characteristics
- ISO 2636:1973 Information processing — Conventions for incorporating flowchart symbols in flowcharts [Withdrawn: replaced with ISO 5807]
- ISO 2637:1973 Aluminium and its alloys — Determination of zinc — Atomic absorption method [Withdrawn: replaced with ISO 5194]
- ISO 2638 Liquid flow measurement in open channels — Dilution methods for the measurement of steady flow — Part 2: Integration method [Draft renamed ISO 555-2
- ISO 2639:2002 Steels — Determination and verification of the depth of carburized and hardened cases [Withdrawn: replaced with ISO 18203]
- ISO 2640 Commercial refrigerated cabinets — Methods of test — Defrosting test [Draft renamed ISO 1992-4]
- ISO 2641 Commercial refrigerated cabinets — Methods of test — Water vapour condensation test [Draft renamed ISO 1992-5]
- ISO 2642 Commercial refrigerated cabinets — Methods of test — Electrical energy consumption test [Draft renamed ISO 1992-6]
- ISO 2643 Commercial refrigerated cabinets — Methods of test — Test for odour of material [Rejected draft]
- ISO 2644:1975 Materials and equipment for petroleum and natural gas industries — Steel drill pipe for oil or natural gas wells [Withdrawn without replacement]
- ISO 2645:1975 Materials and equipment for petroleum and natural gas industries — Casing and tubing for oil or natural gas wells [Withdrawn: replaced with ISO 11960]
- ISO 2646:1974 Wool — Measurement of the length of fibres processed on the worsted system, using a fibre diagram machine
- ISO 2647:2020 Wool — Determination of percentage of medullated fibres by the projection microscope
- ISO 2648:2020 Wool — Determination of fibre length distribution parameters — Capacitance method
- ISO 2649:1974 Wool — Determination of short-term irregularity of linear density of slivers, rovings and yarns, by means of an electronic evenness tester [Withdrawn without replacement]

== ISO 2650 – ISO 2999 ==
- ISO 2650:1974 Environmental tests for aircraft equipment – Part 1: Scope and applicability [Withdrawn: replaced with ISO 7137]
- ISO 2651 Environmental tests for aircraft equipment – Part 2.1: Temperature, pressure and humidity [Rejected draft]
- ISO 2652 Environmental tests for aircraft equipment – Part 2.2: Humidity (24 h cycle) [Rejected draft]
- ISO 2653:1975 Environmental tests for aircraft equipment
  - ISO 2653-1:1975 — Part 1: Ice formation [Withdrawn: replaced with ISO 7137]
- ISO 2655:1975 Environmental tests for aircraft equipment – Part 2.5: Waterproofness [Withdrawn: replaced with ISO 7137]
- ISO 2657:1976 Environmental tests for aircraft equipment – Part 2.7: Change of temperature [Withdrawn: replaced with ISO 7137]
- ISO 2658:1976 Environmental tests for aircraft equipment – Part 2.8: Mould growth [Withdrawn: replaced with ISO 7137]
- ISO 2659 Environmental tests for aircraft equipment – Part 2.9: Salt mist [Rejected draft]
- ISO 2663 Environmental tests for aircraft equipment – Part 2.13: Sealing tests [Rejected draft]
- ISO 2668 Environmental tests for aircraft equipment – Part 3.1: Vibration [Rejected draft]
- ISO 2669:1995 Environmental tests for aircraft equipment – Steady-state acceleration
- ISO 2671:1982 Environmental tests for aircraft equipment – Part 3.4: Acoustic vibration [Withdrawn without replacement]
- ISO 2676:1975 Environmental tests for aircraft equipment – Part 4.1: [Withdrawn: replaced with ISO 7137]
- ISO 2678:1985 Environmental tests for aircraft equipment — Insulation resistance and high voltage tests for electrical equipment
- ISO 2683 Environmental tests for aircraft equipment – Part 5.1: Explosion proofness [Rejected draft]
- ISO 2684:1974 Environmental tests for aircraft equipment – Part 5.2: Fluid contamination [Withdrawn: replaced with ISO 7137]
- ISO 2685:1998 Aircraft – Environmental test procedure for airborne equipment – Resistance to fire in designated fire zones
- ISO 2690:1973 Unrecorded magnetic tapes for instrumentation applications — Physical properties and test methods [Withdrawn without replacement]
- ISO 2691:1987 Photography — Expendable photoflash lamps (without integral reflector) — Definitions and requirements for luminous flux/time characteristics [Withdrawn without replacement]
- ISO 2692:2021 Geometrical product specifications (GPS) – Geometrical tolerancing – Maximum material requirement (MMR), least material requirement (LMR) and reciprocity requirement (RPR)
- ISO 2694: Pressure Wessels [rejected draft]
- ISO 2695:1976 Fibre building boards — Hard and medium boards for general purposes — Quality specifications — Appearance, shape and dimensional tolerances [Withdrawn without replacement]
- ISO 2696:1976 Fibre building boards — Hard and medium boards for general purposes — Quality specifications — Water absorption and swelling in thickness [Withdrawn without replacement]
- ISO 2697:1999 Diesel engines — Fuel nozzles — Size "S"
- ISO 2698:2016 Diesel engines — Clamp-mounted fuel injectors, types 7 and 28
- ISO 2699:1994 Diesel engines — Flange-mounted fuel injectors, size "S" — Types 2, 3, 4, 5 and 6
- ISO 2700:1974 Road vehicles — Screw-mounted injection nozzle holders size "S" — Type 1 [Withdrawn without replacement]
- ISO 2701:1977 Drawn wire for general purpose non-alloy steel wire ropes — Terms of acceptance [Withdrawn without replacement]
- ISO 2702:1977 Heat-treated steel tapping screws — Mechanical properties
- ISO 2703:1973 Buried unplasticized polyvinyl chloride (PVC) pipes for the supply of gaseous fuels — Metric series — Specification [Withdrawn without replacement]
- ISO 2704:1998 Road vehicles — M10 x 1 spark-plugs with flat seating and their cylinder head housings [Withdrawn without replacement]
- ISO 2705:2006 Road vehicles — M12 x 1,25 spark-plugs with flat seating and their cylinder head housings [Withdrawn without replacement]
- ISO 2706 Micrographics — Transparent A6 size microfiche of uniform division — Image arrangement No. 1 [Draft merged into ISO 2707]
- ISO 2707:1980 Micrographics — Transparent A6 size microfiche of uniform division — Image arrangements No. 1 and No. 2 [Withdrawn: replaced with ISO 9923]
- ISO 2708:1980 Micrographics — Transparent A6 size microfiche of variable division — Image arrangements A and B [Withdrawn: replaced with ISO 9923]
- ISO 2709:2008 Information and documentation – Format for information exchange
- ISO 2710 Reciprocating internal combustion engines – Vocabulary
  - ISO 2710-1:2000 Part 1: Terms for engine design and operation
  - ISO 2710-2:1999 Part 2: Terms for engine maintenance
- ISO 2711:1973 Information processing interchange – Representation of ordinal dates [Withdrawn: replaced by ISO 8601:1988]
- ISO 2712:1973 Copper and copper alloys — Rockwell superficial hardness test (N and T scales) [Withdrawn: replaced with ISO 1024]
- ISO 2713:1973 Copper and copper alloys — Rockwell hardness test (B, F and G scales) [Withdrawn: replaced with ISO 6508]
- ISO 2714:2017 Liquid hydrocarbons — Volumetric measurement by displacement meter
- ISO 2715:2017 Liquid hydrocarbons — Volumetric measurement by turbine flowmeter
- ISO 2716:1972 Freight containers — Coding and identification [Withdrawn: replaced with ISO 6346]
- ISO 2717:1973 Sulphuric acid and oleum for industrial use — Determination of lead content — Dithizone photometric method [Withdrawn without replacement]
- ISO 2718:1974 Standard layout for a method of chemical analysis by gas chromatography [Withdrawn without replacement]
- ISO 2719:2016 Determination of flash point — Pensky-Martens closed cup method
- ISO 2720:1974 Photography — General purpose photographic exposure meters (photoelectric type) — Guide to product specification
- ISO 2721:2013 Photography — Film-based cameras — Automatic controls of exposure
- ISO 2722:1997 Vitreous and porcelain enamels — Determination of resistance to citric acid at room temperature [Withdrawn: replaced with ISO 28706-1]
- ISO 2723:1995 Vitreous and porcelain enamels for sheet steel — Production of specimens for testing [Withdrawn: replaced with ISO 28764]
- ISO 2724:1973 Vitreous and porcelain enamels for cast iron — Production of specimens for testing [Withdrawn: replaced with ISO 28764]
- ISO 2725 Assembly tools for screws and nuts — Square drive sockets
- ISO 2725-1:2017 Part 1: Hand-operated sockets
- ISO 2725-2:2017 Part 2: Machine-operated sockets ("impact")
- ISO 2725-3:2017 Part 3: Machine-operated sockets ("non-impact")
- ISO 2726:1995 Woodworking tools — Metal-bodied bench planes, plane cutters and cap irons [Withdrawn without replacement]
- ISO 2727:1973 Modular units for machine tool construction — Headstocks
- ISO 2728:1982 Woodworking tools — Plane irons [Withdrawn: replaced with ISO 2726]
- ISO 2729:1995 Woodworking tools — Chisels and gouges
- ISO 2730:1973 Woodworking tools — Wooden bodied planes [Withdrawn without replacement]
- ISO 2731:1973 Dee shackles [Withdrawn: replaced with ISO 2415]
- ISO 2732:1984 Steel and cast iron — Determination of phosphorus content — Phosphovanadomolybdate spectrophotometric method [Withdrawn: replaced with ISO 10714]
- ISO 2733:1983 Vitreous and porcelain enamels — Apparatus for testing with acid and neutral liquids and their vapours [Withdrawn: replaced with ISO 28706-2]
- ISO 2734:1997 Vitreous and porcelain enamels — Apparatus for testing with alkaline liquids [Withdrawn: replaced with ISO 28706-4]
- ISO 2735:1973 Hermetically sealed metal food containers — Capacities and diameters of round open-top and vent hole cans for milk [Withdrawn: replaced with ISO 3004-6 (now replaced with ISO 10653 and 10654 and ISO/TR 11761, 11762, and 11776) and ISO/TR 8610]
- ISO 2736 Concrete tests — Test specimens
  - ISO 2736-1 Part 1: Sampling of fresh concrete [Withdrawn: replaced with ISO 1920-1]
  - ISO 2736-2 Part 2: Making and curing of test specimens for strength tests [Withdrawn: replaced with ISO 1920-3]
- ISO 2737:1973 Permeable sintered metal materials — Determination of oil content [Withdrawn: replaced with ISO 2738]
- ISO 2738:1999 Sintered metal materials, excluding hardmetals — Permeable sintered metal materials — Determination of density, oil content and open porosity
- ISO 2739:2012 Sintered metal bushings — Determination of radial crushing strength
- ISO 2740:2009 Sintered metal materials, excluding hardmetals — Tensile test pieces
- ISO 2741:1973 Zinc alloys — Complexometric determination of magnesium [Withdrawn without replacement]
- ISO 2742:1998 Vitreous and porcelain enamels — Determination of resistance to boiling citric acid [Withdrawn: replaced with ISO 28706-2]
- ISO 2743:1986 Vitreous and porcelain enamels — Determination of resistance to condensing hydrochloric acid vapour [Withdrawn: replaced with ISO 28706-2]
- ISO 2744:1998 Vitreous and porcelain enamels — DDetermination of resistance to boiling water and water vapour [Withdrawn: replaced with ISO 28706-2]
- ISO 2745:1998 Vitreous and porcelain enamels — Determination of resistance to hot sodium hydroxide [Withdrawn: replaced with ISO 28706-4]
- ISO 2746:2015 Vitreous and porcelain enamels — High voltage test
- ISO 2747:1998 Vitreous and porcelain enamels — Enamelled cooking utensils — Determination of resistance to thermal shock
- ISO 2748:1983 Textile machinery and accessories — Lingoes for Jacquard weaving [Withdrawn without replacement]
- ISO 2749:1973 Urea for industrial use — Measurement of the pH of a solution of urea of conventional concentration (100 g/L) — Potentiometric method [Withdrawn without replacement]
- ISO 2750:1974 Urea for industrial use — Measurement of colour in Hazen units (platinum-cobalt scale) of a urea-formaldehyde solution [Withdrawn without replacement]
- ISO 2751:1973 Urea for industrial use — Determination of the buffer coefficient — Potentiometric method [Withdrawn without replacement]
- ISO 2752:1973 Urea for industrial use — Measurement of the variation of pH in the presence of formaldehyde — Potentiometric method [Withdrawn without replacement]
- ISO 2753:1973 Urea for industrial use — Determination of water content — Karl Fischer method [Withdrawn without replacement]
- ISO 2754:1973 Urea for industrial use — Determination of biuret content — Photometric method [Withdrawn without replacement]
- ISO 2755:1973 1,1,1- Trichloroethane for industrial use — List of methods of test [Withdrawn without replacement]
- ISO 2756:1973 Hexachlorobenzene for industrial use — List of methods of test [Withdrawn without replacement]
- ISO 2757:1973 1,2,4- Trichlorobenzene for industrial use — List of methods of test [Withdrawn without replacement]
- ISO 2758:2014 Paper — Determination of bursting strength
- ISO 2759:2014 Board — Determination of bursting strength
- ISO 2760:1975 Crude sodium borates for industrial use — Determination of total aluminium content — Titrimetric method [Withdrawn without replacement]
- ISO 2761:1975 Crude sodium borates for industrial use — Determination of total titanium content — Photometric method [Withdrawn without replacement]
- ISO 2762:1973 Hydrochloric acid for industrial use — Determination of soluble sulphates — Turbidimetric method
- ISO 2763 Data processing — Vocabulary — Part 02: Mathematics and logic, arithmetic and logical operations [Draft merged into ISO 2382]
- ISO 2764:1974 Terms and symbols for flight dynamics — Concepts, quantities and symbols used in the study of aircraft stability and control [Withdrawn: replaced with ISO 1151-4]
- ISO 2765:1974 Flight dynamics — Concepts, quantities and symbols — Quantities used in measurements [Withdrawn: replaced with ISO 1151-5]
- ISO 2766:1973 Single lifting hooks with shank — Capacity up to 25 tonnes — Grades M, P, S (T, V) — Hammer and drop forged hooks [Withdrawn without replacement]
- ISO 2767:1973 Surface treatments of metals — Anodic oxidation of aluminium and its alloys — Specular reflectance at 45 degrees — Total reflectance — Image clarity [Withdrawn: replaced with ISO 10215 and ISO 10216]
- ISO 2768 General tolerances
  - ISO 2768-1:1989 Part 1: Tolerances for linear and angular dimensions without individual tolerance indications
  - ISO 2768-2:1989 Part 2: Geometrical tolerances for features without individual tolerance indications [Withdrawn: replaced with ISO 22081]
- ISO 2769:1973 Modular units for machine tool construction — Wing bases for slide units
- ISO 2770:1974 Tapping screws according to ISO/R 1478 to 1483 — Minimum and maximum lengths [Withdrawn without replacement]
- ISO 2771:1980 Iron ores — Determination of aluminium content — Oxine gravimetric and titrimetric methods [Withdrawn without replacement]
- ISO 2772:2019 Test conditions for box type vertical drilling machines — Testing of the accuracy
- ISO 2773:2024 Test conditions for pillar type vertical drilling machines — Testing of accuracy
- ISO 2775:1977 Office machines and printing machines used for information processing – Widths of one-time paper or plastic printing ribbons and marking to indicate the end of the ribbons
- ISO 2776:1974 Modular co-ordination — Co-ordinating sizes for doorsets — External and internal [Withdrawn without replacement]
- ISO 2777:1974 Modular co-ordination — Co-ordinating sizes for rigid flat sheet boards used in building [Withdrawn without replacement]
- ISO/TR 2778:1977 Wrought aluminium and aluminium alloys — Drawn tubes — Mechanical properties [Withdrawn: replaced with ISO 6363-2]
- ISO 2779:1973 Aluminium machining alloys — Chemical composition and mechanical properties of alloys Al-Cu6 Bi Pb and Al-Cu4 Pb Mg [Withdrawn: replaced with ISO 209-1]
- ISO 2780:2018 Milling cutters with tenon drive — Interchangeability dimensions for cutter arbors — Metric series
- ISO 2781:2018 Rubber, vulcanized or thermoplastic — Determination of density
- ISO 2782 Rubber, vulcanized or thermoplastic — Determination of permeability to gases
  - ISO 2782-1:2016 Part 1: Differential-pressure methods
  - ISO 2782-2:2018 Part 2: Equal-pressure method
- ISO 2783:1975 Ebonite — Determination of hardness by means of a durometer [Withdrawn without replacement]
- ISO 2784:1974 Continuous forms used for information processing – Sizes and sprocket feed holes
- ISO 2785:1986 Directives for selection of asbestos-cement pipes subject to external loads with or without internal pressure [Withdrawn without replacement]
- ISO 2786 Modular co-ordination — Internal wood doorsets — Principal dimensions [Rejected draft]
- ISO 2787:1984 Rotary and percussive pneumatic tools — Performance tests
- ISO 2788:1986 Documentation – Guidelines for the establishment and development of monolingual thesauri [Withdrawn: replaced by ISO 25964-1:2011]
- ISO 2789:2022 Information and documentation – International library statistics
- ISO 2790:2020 Belt drives — V-belts for the automotive industry and corresponding pulleys — Dimensions
- ISO 2791:1973 Bow shackles [Withdrawn: replaced with ISO 2415]
- ISO 2792 Dentistry – Vocabulary – Part 2 [Draft merged into ISO 1942]
- ISO 2793 Dentistry – Vocabulary – Part 3 [Draft merged into ISO 1942]
- ISO 2794 Dentistry – Vocabulary – Part 4 [Draft merged into ISO 1942]
- ISO 2795:2020 Plain bearings — Sintered bushes — Dimensions and tolerances
- ISO 2796:1986 Cellular plastics, rigid — Test for dimensional stability
- ISO 2797:2017 Textile glass — Rovings — Basis for a specification
- ISO 2798:1974 Plastics — Designation of copolymer resins of vinyl chloride [Withdrawn: replaced with ISO 1060-1]
- ISO/TR 2799:1978 Cellular plastics — Determination of the temperature at which fixed permanent deformation of rigid materials occurs under compressive load [Withdrawn: replaced with ISO 7616]
- ISO 2800:1973 Photography — Expendable photoflash lamps — Definition and evaluation of flashability [Withdrawn without replacement]
- ISO/TR 2801:2007 Clothing for protection against heat and flame — General recommendations for selection, care and use of protective clothing
- ISO 2802:1974 Textile machinery and accessories — Plastic travellers for spinning and twisting [Withdrawn: replaced with ISO 96-2]
- ISO 2803:1974 Photography — Silver-gelatin type microfilms — Processing and storage for archival purposes [Withdrawn: replaced with ISO 4331 and ISO 4332 (both replaced with ISO 10602, now replaced with ISO 18901), and ISO 5466 (now replaced with ISO 18911)]
- ISO 2804:1996 Wire, bar or tube drawing dies — As-sintered pellets of hardmetal (carbide) — Dimensions
- ISO 2805 Transliteration of the alphabets of non-Slavic languages using Cyrillic characters [Rejected draft]
- ISO 2806:1994 Industrial automation systems – Numerical control of machines – Vocabulary
- ISO 2808:2019 Paints and varnishes — Determination of film thickness
- ISO 2809:1976 Paints and varnishes — Determination of light fastness of paints for interior use [Withdrawn: replaced with ISO 11341, now replaced with ISO 16474-(1-2)]
- ISO 2810:2020 Paints and varnishes — Natural weathering of coatings — Exposure and assessment
- ISO 2811 Paints and varnishes — Determination of density
  - ISO 2811-1:2016 Part 1: Pycnometer method
  - ISO 2811-2:2011 Part 2: Immersed body (plummet) method
  - ISO 2811-3:2011 Part 3: Oscillation method
  - ISO 2811-4:2011 Part 4: Pressure cup method
- ISO 2812 Paints and varnishes — Determination of resistance to liquids
  - ISO 2812-1:2017 Part 1: Immersion in liquids other than water
  - ISO 2812-2:2018 Part 2: Water immersion method
  - ISO 2812-3:2019 Part 3: Method using an absorbent medium
  - ISO 2812-4:2017 Part 4: Spotting methods
  - ISO 2812-5:2018 Part 5: Temperature-gradient oven method
- ISO 2813:2014 Paints and varnishes — Determination of gloss value at 20°, 60° and 85°
- ISO 2814:1973 Paints and varnishes — Comparison of contrast ratio (hiding power) of paints of the same type and colour [Withdrawn without replacement]
- ISO 2815:2003 Paints and varnishes — Buchholz indentation test
- ISO 2816:1973 Fundamental characteristics of a system of shoe sizing to be known as Mondopoint [Withdrawn: replaced with ISO 9407]
- ISO 2817:1999 Tobacco and tobacco products — Determination of silicated residues insoluble in hydrochloric acid
- ISO 2818:2018 Plastics — Preparation of test specimens by machining
- ISO 2819:2017 Metallic coatings on metallic substrates — Electrodeposited and chemically deposited coatings — Review of methods available for testing adhesion
- ISO 2820:1974 Leather — Raw hides of cattle and horses — Method of trim
- ISO 2821:1974 Leather — Raw hides of cattle and horses — Preservation by stack salting
- ISO 2822 Raw cattle hides and calf skins
  - ISO 2822-1:1998 Part 1: Descriptions of defects
- ISO 2823 Statistics — Vocabulary and symbols — Third series [Rejected draft merged into ISO 3534]
- ISO 2824 Symbolic designation of direction of closing and faces of doors, windows and shutters — Part 2 [Rejected draft]
- ISO 2825:1981 Spices and condiments — Preparation of a ground sample for analysis
- ISO 2826:1974 Apricots — Guide to cold storage
- ISO 2827:1988 Photography — Electronic flash equipment — Determination of light output and performance
- ISO 2828:1973 Aluminium oxide primarily used for the production of aluminium — Determination of fluorine content — Alizarin complexone and lanthanum chloride spectrophotometric method
- ISO 2829:1973 Aluminium oxide primarily used for the production of aluminium — Determination of phosphorus content — Reduced phosphomolybdate spectrophotometric method
- ISO 2830:1973 Cryolite, natural and artificial — Determination of aluminium content — Atomic absorption method
- ISO 2831:1973 Sodium fluoride for industrial use — Determination of water-insoluble matter
- ISO 2832:1973 Sodium fluoride for industrial use — Determination of moisture content
- ISO 2833:1973 Sodium fluoride for industrial use — Determination of fluorine content — Modified Willard-Winter method
- ISO 2834 Graphic technology — Laboratory preparation of test prints
- ISO 2834-1:2020 Part 1: Paste inks
- ISO 2834-2:2015 Part 2: Liquid printing inks
- ISO 2834-3:2008 Part 3: Screen printing inks
- ISO 2835:1974 Prints and printing inks — Assessment of light fastness [Withdrawn without replacement]
- ISO 2836:2021 Graphic technology — Prints and printing inks — Assessment of resistance of prints to various agents
- ISO 2837:1996 Graphic technology — Prints and printing inks — Assessment of resistance to solvents [Withdrawn: replaced with ISO 2836]
- ISO 2838:1974 Prints and printing inks — Assessment of resistance to alkalis [Withdrawn: replaced with ISO 2836]
- ISO 2839:1974 Prints and printing inks — Assessment of resistance to soaps [Withdrawn: replaced with ISO 2836]
- ISO 2840:1974 Prints and printing inks — Assessment of resistance of prints to detergents [Withdrawn: replaced with ISO 2836]
- ISO 2841:1974 Prints and printing inks — Assessment of resistance of prints to cheese [Withdrawn: replaced with ISO 2836]
- ISO 2842:1974 Prints and printing inks — Assessment of resistance of prints to edible oils [Withdrawn: replaced with ISO 2836]
- ISO 2843:1974 Prints and printing inks — Assessment of resistance of prints to impregnation by wax or paraffin wax [Withdrawn: replaced with ISO 2836]
- ISO 2844:1974 Prints and printing inks — Assessment of resistance of prints to spices [Withdrawn: replaced with ISO 2836]
- ISO 2845:1975 Set of printing inks for letterpress printing — Colorimetric characteristics [Withdrawn: replaced with ISO 2846-1]
- ISO 2846 Graphic technology — Colour and transparency of printing ink sets for four-colour printing (originally Set of printing inks for offset printing — Colorimetric characteristics)
  - ISO 2846-1:2017 Part 1: Sheet-fed and heat-set web offset lithographic printing
  - ISO 2846-2:2007 Part 2: Coldset offset lithographic printing
- ISO 2848:1984 Building construction – Modular coordination – Principles and rules
- ISO 2849 Building construction – Modular coordination – Modules for vertical dimensions [Rejected draft]
- ISO 2850:1973 Potassium sulphate for industrial use — Determination of loss of mass at 105 degrees C [Withdrawn without replacement]
- ISO 2851:1993 Stainless steel bends and tees for the food industry [Withdrawn without replacement]
- ISO 2852:1993 Stainless steel clamp pipe couplings for the food industry [Withdrawn without replacement]
- ISO 2853:1993 Stainless steel threaded couplings for the food industry [Withdrawn without replacement]
- ISO 2854:1976 Statistical interpretation of data – Techniques of estimation and tests relating to means and variances
- ISO 2855:1976 Radioactive materials — Packagings — Test for contents leakage and radiation leakage [Withdrawn without replacement]
- ISO 2856:1981 Elastomers — General requirements for dynamic testing [Withdrawn: replaced with ISO 4664]
- ISO 2857:1973 Ground thread taps for ISO metric threads of tolerances 4H to 8H and 4G to 6G coarse and fine pitches — Manufacturing tolerances on the threaded portion
- ISO 2858:1975 End-suction centrifugal pumps (rating 16 bar) — Designation, nominal duty point and dimensions
- ISO 2859 Sampling procedures for inspection by attributes
  - ISO 2859-1:1999 Part 1: Sampling schemes indexed by acceptance quality limit (AQL) for lot-by-lot inspection
  - ISO 2859-2:2020 Part 2: Sampling plans indexed by limiting quality (LQ) for isolated lot inspection
  - ISO 2859-3:2005 Part 3: Skip-lot sampling procedures
  - ISO 2859-4:2020 Part 4: Procedures for assessment of declared quality levels
  - ISO 2859-5:2005 Part 5: System of sequential sampling plans indexed by acceptance quality limit (AQL) for lot-by-lot inspection
  - ISO 2859-10:2006 Part 10: Introduction to the ISO 2859 series of standards for sampling for inspection by attributes [Withdrawn: replaced with ISO 28590]
- ISO 2860:1992 Earth-moving machinery — Minimum access dimensions
- ISO 2861:2020 Vacuum technology — Dimensions of clamped-type quick-release couplings
- ISO 2862:1974 Cinematography — Single-track magnetic sound record on 35 mm motion-picture films — Position and dimensions [Withdrawn without replacement]
- ISO 2863:1973 Cinematography — Motion-picture camera cartridge, 8 mm Type S Model II — Run length of film — Dimensions and specifications [Withdrawn without replacement]
- ISO 2864:1974 Interchangeable magnetic six-disk pack — Physical and magnetic characteristics [Withdrawn without replacement]
- ISO 2865:1973 Aluminium oxide primarily used for the production of aluminium — Determination of boron content — Curcumin spectrophotometric method
- ISO 2866:1974 Sulphur for industrial use — Determination of total carbon content — Titrimetric method [Withdrawn without replacement]
- ISO 2867:2011 Earth-moving machinery — Access systems
- ISO 2868:1973 Surface active agents — Detergents — Anionic-active matter stable to acid hydrolysis — Determination of trace amounts
- ISO 2869:1973 Surface active agents — Detergents — Anionic-active matter hydrolyzable under alkaline conditions — Determination of hydrolyzable and non-hydrolyzable anionic-active matter
- ISO 2870:2009 Surface active agents — Detergents — Determination of anionic-active matter hydrolysable and non-hydrolysable under acid conditions
- ISO 2871 Surface active agents — Detergents — Determination of cationic-active matter content
  - ISO 2871-1:2010 Part 1: High-molecular-mass cationic-active matter
  - ISO 2871-2:2010 Part 2: Cationic-active matter of low molecular mass (between 200 and 500)
- ISO 2872:1985 Packaging — Complete, filled transport packages — Compression test [Withdrawn: replaced with ISO 12048]
- ISO 2873:2000 Packaging — Complete, filled transport packages and unit loads — Low pressure test
- ISO 2874:1985 Packaging — Complete, filled transport packages — Stacking test using compression tester [Withdrawn: replaced with ISO 12048]
- ISO 2875:2000 Packaging — Complete, filled transport packages and unit loads — Water-spray test
- ISO 2876:1985 Packaging — Complete, filled transport packages — Rolling test
- ISO 2877:1974 Sulphuric acid for industrial use — Determination of chlorides content — Potentiometric method [Withdrawn without replacement]
- ISO 2878:2017 Rubber, vulcanized or thermoplastic — Antistatic and conductive products — Determination of electrical resistance
- ISO 2879:1975 Glycerine for industrial use — Determination of glycerol content — Titrimetric method [Withdrawn without replacement]
- ISO 2880 Determination of Sound Power Emitted by Sma 11 Noise Sources in Reverberation Rooms — Part 1: Broad Band Sources [Rejected draft]
- ISO 2881:1992 Tobacco and tobacco products — Determination of alkaloid content — Spectrometric method
- ISO 2882:1979 Rubber, vulcanized — Antistatic and conductive products for hospital use — Electrical resistance limits [Withdrawn without replacement]
- ISO 2883:1980 Rubber, vulcanized — Antistatic and conductive products for industrial use — Electrical resistance limits [Withdrawn without replacement]
- ISO 2884 Paints and varnishes — Determination of viscosity using rotary viscometers
  - ISO 2884-1:1999 Part 1: Cone-and-plate viscometer operated at a high rate of shear
  - ISO 2884-2:2003 Part 2: Disc or ball viscometer operated at a specified speed
- ISO 2885:1973 Acetaldehyde for industrial use — Determination of total content of carbonyl compounds — Volumetric method [Withdrawn without replacement]
- ISO 2886:1973 Acetaldehyde for industrial use — Determination of iron content — 2,2'- Bipyridyl photometric method [Withdrawn without replacement]
- ISO 2887:1973 secButyl alcohol, methyl ethyl ketone, isobutyl methyl ketone, isoamyl ethyl ketone, diacetone alcohol and hexylene glycol for industrial use — Determination of acidity to phenolphthalein — Volumetric method [Withdrawn without replacement]
- ISO 2888:1973 Furfural for industrial use — Determination of acidity to phenolphthalein — Volumetric method [Withdrawn without replacement]
- ISO 2889:2021 Sampling airborne radioactive materials from the stacks and ducts of nuclear facilities
- ISO 2890:1973 Road vehicles — Vacuum braking for caravans and light trailers [Withdrawn without replacement]
- ISO 2891:1977 Modular units for machine tool construction — Centre bases and columns [Withdrawn without replacement]
- ISO 2892:2007 Austenitic cast irons — Classification
- ISO 2893 General Methods of Test for Pigments — Comparison of Ease of Dispersion (Oscillatory Shaking Method) [Rejected Draft]
- ISO 2894:1980 Embossed credit cards — Specifications, numbering system and registration procedure [Withdrawn: replaced with ISO 7810, ISO 7811-(1-5), and ISO/IEC 7813]
- ISO 2895:1974 Cinematography — Screen luminance for review room projection of motion-picture film intended for indoor theatres [Withdrawn: replaced with ISO 2910]
- ISO 2896:2001 Rigid cellular plastics — Determination of water absorption
- ISO 2897:1976 Plastics — Designation of impact-resistant polystyrenes [Withdrawn without replacement]
- ISO 2898 Plastics — Plasticized poly(vinyl chloride) (PVC-P) moulding and extrusion materials
  - ISO 2898-1:1996 Part 1: Designation system and basis for specifications [Withdrawn: replaced with ISO 24023-1]
  - ISO 2898-2:2008 Part 2: Preparation of test specimens and determination of properties [Withdrawn: replaced with ISO 24023-2]
- ISO 2899:1974 Sulphuric acid and oleums for industrial use — Determination of ammoniacal nitrogen content — Spectrophotometric method [Withdrawn without replacement]
- ISO 2900:1973 Potassium Hydroxide for Industrial Use – Determination of Carbon Dioxide Content – Titrimetric Method [Withdrawn without replacement]
- ISO 2901:2016 ISO metric trapezoidal screw threads — Basic and design profiles
- ISO 2902:2016 ISO metric trapezoidal screw threads — General plan
- ISO 2903:2016 ISO metric trapezoidal screw threads — Tolerances
- ISO 2904:2020 ISO metric trapezoidal screw threads — Basic dimensions
- ISO 2905:1985 Modular units for machine tool construction — Spindle noses and adjustable adaptors for multi-spindle heads
- ISO 2906:2002 Cinematography — Image area produced by camera aperture on 35 mm motion-picture film — Position and dimensions
- ISO 2907:2002 Cinematography — Maximum projectable image area on 35 mm motion-picture film — Position and dimensions
- ISO 2908:1974 Petroleum waxes — Determination of oil content [Withdrawn without replacement]
- ISO 2909:2002 Petroleum products — Calculation of viscosity index from kinematic viscosity
- ISO 2910:2018 Cinematography — Screen luminance and chrominance for the projection of film motion pictures
- ISO 2911:2004 Sweetened condensed milk — Determination of sucrose content — Polarimetric method
- ISO 2912:1973 Modular units for machine tool construction — Multi-spindle heads — Casing and input drive shaft dimensions
- ISO 2913:1975 Wool — Colorimetric determination of cystine plus cysteine in hydrolysates
- ISO 2915:1975 Wool — Determination of cysteic acid content of wool hydrolysates by paper electrophoresis and colorimetry
- ISO 2916:1975 Wool — Determination of alkali content
- ISO 2917:1999 Meat and meat products — Measurement of pH — Reference method
- ISO 2918:1975 Meat and meat products — Determination of nitrite content (Reference method)
- ISO 2919:2012 Radiological protection — Sealed radioactive sources — General requirements and classification
- ISO 2920:2004 Whey cheese — Determination of dry matter (Reference method)
- ISO 2921:2019 Rubber, vulcanized — Determination of low-temperature characteristics — Temperature-retraction procedure (TR test)
- ISO 2922:2020 Acoustics – Measurement of airborne sound emitted by vessels on inland waterways and harbours
- ISO 2923:1996 Acoustics – Measurement of noise on board vessels
- ISO 2924:1973 Solid and segmental circular saws for cold cutting of metals — Interchangeability dimensions of the drive — Saw diameter range 224 to 2 240 mm
- ISO 2925:1973 Aluminium fluoride for industrial use – Preparation and storage of test samples [Withdrawn without replacement]
- ISO 2926:2013 Aluminium oxide used for the production of primary aluminium — Particle size analysis for the range 45 μm to 150 μm — Method using electroformed sieves
- ISO 2927:1973 Aluminium oxide primarily used for the production of aluminium — Sampling
- ISO 2928:2021 Rubber hoses and hose assemblies for liquefied petroleum gas (LPG) in the liquid or gaseous phase and natural gas up to 2,5 MPa (25 bar) — Specification
- ISO 2929:2021 Rubber hoses and hose assemblies for bulk fuel delivery by truck — Specification
- ISO 2930:2017 Rubber, raw natural — Determination of plasticity retention index (PRI)
- ISO 2931:2017 Anodizing of aluminium and its alloys — Assessment of quality of sealed anodic oxidation coatings by measurement of admittance
- ISO 2932:1981 Anodizing of aluminium and its alloys — Assessment of sealing quality by measurement of the loss of mass after immersion in acid solution [Withdrawn without replacement]
- ISO 2933:1974 Bonded abrasive products — Grinding wheel dimensions (Part 3) [Withdrawn: replaced with ISO 603-(1-16)]
- ISO 2934:1973 Modular units for machine tool construction — Wing base for columns
- ISO 2935:1974 Circular saw blades for woodworking — Dimensions [Withdrawn without replacement]
- ISO 2936:2014 Assembly tools for screws and nuts — Hexagon socket screw keys
- ISO 2937:1974 Plain end seamless steel tubes for mechanical application [Withdrawn without replacement]
- ISO 2938:1974 Hollow steel bars for machining [Withdrawn without replacement]
- ISO 2939:2015 Cinematography — Picture image area on 35 mm motion-picture release prints — Position and dimensions and analogue and digital photographic sound to picture record displacement
- ISO 2940 Milling cutters mounted on centring arbors having a 7/24 taper
  - ISO 2940-1:1974 Fitting dimensions — Centring arbors
  - ISO 2940-2:1974 Inserted tooth cutters
- ISO 2941:2009 Hydraulic fluid power — Filter elements — Verification of collapse/burst pressure rating
- ISO 2942:2018 Hydraulic fluid power — Filter elements — Verification of fabrication integrity and determination of the first bubble point
- ISO 2943:1998 Hydraulic fluid power — Filter elements — Verification of material compatibility with fluids
- ISO 2944:2000 Fluid power systems and components — Nominal pressures
- ISO 2945 Bases for the design of structures [Rejected draft, but partly covered by ISO 4356]
- ISO 2946 Acoustics — Determination of sound power levels of noise sources — Precision methods for discrete-frequency and narrow-band sources in reverberation rooms [Draft renamed ISO 3742]
- ISO 2947:1973 Textiles — Integrated conversion table for replacing traditional yarn numbers by rounded values in the Tex System
- ISO 2948 Brown coals and lignites — Extensive method of analysis of ash [Rejected draft]
- ISO 2949 Brown coals and lignites — Analysis of ash [Rejected draft]
- ISO 2950:1974 Brown coals and lignites — Classification by types on the basis of total moisture content and tar yield
- ISO 2951:2019 Rubber, vulcanized rubber — Determination of insulation resistance
- ISO 2953:1999 Mechanical vibration — Balancing machines — Description and evaluation [Withdrawn: replaced with ISO 21940-21]
- ISO 2954:2012 Mechanical vibration of rotating and reciprocating machinery – Requirements for instruments for measuring vibration severity
- ISO 2955:1983 Information processing — Representation of SI and other units in systems with limited character sets [Withdrawn without replacement]
- ISO 2958:1973 Road vehicles — Exterior protection for passenger cars
- ISO 2959:2011 Textiles — Woven fabric descriptions
- ISO 2960:1974 Textiles — Determination of bursting strength and bursting distension — Diaphragm method [Withdrawn: replaced with ISO 13938-1]
- ISO 2961:1974 Aluminium oxide primarily used for the production of aluminium — Determination of an adsorption index
- ISO 2962:2010 Cheese and processed cheese products — Determination of total phosphorus content — Molecular absorption spectrometric method
- ISO/TS 2963:2006 Cheese and processed cheese products — Determination of citric acid content — Enzymatic method
- ISO 2964:1985 Aerospace — Tubing — Outside diameters and thicknesses — Metric dimensions
- ISO 2965:2019 Materials used as cigarette papers, filter plug wrap and filter joining paper, including materials having a discrete or oriented permeable zone and materials with bands of differing permeability — Determination of air permeability
- ISO 2966:1988 Cinematography — 16 mm motion-picture film perforated 8 mm Type S (1-3) and (1-4) — Cutting and perforating dimensions [Withdrawn without replacement]
- ISO 2967:1982 Cinematography — Magnetic stripes for sound records on 35 mm motion-picture film perforated 8 mm Type S-5R (1-3-5-7-0) — Positions and width dimensions [Withdrawn without replacement]
- ISO 2968:1981 Cinematography — Recorded characteristics for magnetic sound record on 8 mm Type S motion- picture prints and full-coat magnetic film perforated 8 mm Type S — Specifications [Withdrawn without replacement]
- ISO 2969:2015 Cinematography — B-chain electro-acoustic response of motion-picture control rooms and indoor theatres — Specifications and measurements
- ISO 2970:1974 Cheese — determination of chloride content [Withdrawn without replacement]
- ISO 2971:2013 Cigarettes and filter rods — Determination of nominal diameter — Method using a non-contact optical measuring apparatus
- ISO 2972:1979 Numerical control of machines – Symbols
- ISO 2973 Freight containers [Rejected Draft[
- ISO 2974:2018 Diesel engines — 60° female cones for high-pressure fuel injection components
- ISO 2975 Measurement of water flow in closed conduits – Tracer methods
  - ISO 2975-1:1974 Part 1: General
  - ISO 2975-2:1975 Part 2: Constant rate injection method using non-radioactive tracers
  - ISO 2975-3:1976 Part 3: Constant rate injection method using radioactive tracers [Withdrawn without replacement]
  - ISO 2975-6:1977 Part 6: Transit time method using non-radioactive tracers
  - ISO 2975-7:1977 Part 7: Transit time method using radioactive tracers [Withdrawn without replacement]
- ISO 2976:2005 Coated abrasives — Abrasive belts — Selection of width/length combinations
- ISO 2977:1997 Petroleum products and hydrocarbon solvents — Determination of aniline point and mixed aniline point
- ISO 2979 Aircraft — Design of intermodal containers [Rejected draft]
- ISO 2982 Rolling bearings — Accessories
  - ISO 2982-1:2013 Part 1: Dimensions for adapter sleeve assemblies and withdrawal sleeves
  - ISO 2982-2:2013 Part 2: Dimensions for locknuts and locking devices
- ISO 2983:1975 Rolling bearings — Locknuts, wide series, and lockwashers with bent inner tab [Withdrawn without replacement]
- ISO 2990:1974 Nitric acid for industrial use — Evaluation of the nitric acid concentration by measurement of density [Withdrawn without replacement]
- ISO 2991:1974 Nitric acid for industrial use — Determination of ammoniacal nitrogen content — Spectrophotometric method [Withdrawn without replacement]
- ISO 2992:1974 Ammonium sulphate for industrial use — Determination of iron content — 2,2'- Bipyridyl photometric method [Withdrawn without replacement]
- ISO 2993:1974 Ammonium sulphate for industrial use — Determination of free acidity — Titrimetric method [Withdrawn without replacement]
- ISO 2994:1974 Ammonium sulphate for industrial use — Determination of matter insoluble in water — Gravimetric method [Withdrawn without replacement]
- ISO 2995:1974 Ammonium nitrate for industrial use — Determination of matter insoluble in water — Gravimetric method [Withdrawn without replacement]
- ISO 2996:1974 Sodium tripolyphosphate and sodium pyrophosphate for industrial use — Determination of particle size distribution by mechanical sieving [Withdrawn without replacement]
- ISO 2997:1974 Phosphoric acid for industrial use — Determination of sulphate content — Method by reduction and titrimetry
- ISO 2998:1974 Sodium tripolyphosphate and sodium pyrophosphate for industrial use — Determination of orthophosphate content — Photometric method using the reduced molybdophosphate [Withdrawn without replacement]
- ISO 2999:1974 Sodium pyrophosphate for industrial use — Estimation of pyrophosphate content — Potentiometric method [Withdrawn without replacement]

== See also ==
- List of International Organization for Standardization standards, 1–4999
