= Victor Gankin =

Scientist and professor

- Born: December 5, 1935; USSR
- Died: March 30, 2014 (aged 78); Needham, Massachusetts, United States
- Citizenship: USSR; USA
- Education: Chemical-Pharmaceutical Institute (Leningrad)
- Known for: Novel ("recycle") process of isoprene and other synthetic rubber components production
- Scientific career
- Fields: Chemist

Victor Yudkovich Gankin (Russian: Виктор Юдкович Ганкин, 8 December 1935 – 30 March 2014) was a Russian-American scientist and professor who greatly influenced the fields of organic and physical chemistry and industrial technology. He held a PhD and Doctor of Science distinction.

== Biography ==
1953-1959 studied in Chemical-Pharmaceutical Institute, Leningrad (St. Petersburg), USSR.

1959-1991 worked in Research Institute of Petrochemical Processes (Leningrad) as a chemist, then as a senior research scientist and in 1968-1991 as a principal scientist.

In 1964 Victor Gankin received a PhD in Organic Chemistry and Technology of Oxosynthesis Process from the Leningrad State University.

In 1969 Victor Gankin received a Dr. of Science degree in Technology of Organic Synthesis from the Institute of Petrochemical Synthesis (Moscow, Russia).

In 1970 received the title of Professor of Chemical Science and Technology.

Victor immigrated to the United States (Boston, MA) in 1991 and founded Institute of Theoretical Chemistry, ITC (Shrewsbury, MA), then Needham, Massachusetts in 1993. He served as the president of ITC from 1993–2014.

Victor Gankin died on 30 March 2014 in Needham, MA.

== Scientific work ==
Victor Gankin was the principal inventor of the novel (“recycle”) process of isoprene and other synthetic rubber components production (references to patents from the CV). The recycle process prevented an impending ecological crisis by replacing the conventional manufacturing process dumping of over 20 thousand none-degradable toxic organic materials annually into the Volga and other rivers. The process allowed for reagents recycling while reducing the manufacturing costs by over 20%. The recycle process was implemented in Tolyatti, Chaikovsk, Nizhnekamsk (Russia).

Victor Gankin discovered and described the mechanism of the hydroformylation reaction and the new type of chemically active particles: coordinately unsaturated compounds (coined term Conences). Novel processes invented and developed by Victor were implemented in Angarsk (butyl alcohols), Salavat, Perm.

The new paradigms and principles proposed by Victor Gankin are as follows: 1) The physical nature of chemical bonding can be explained in the framework of the classical phenomenological approach. 2) One and the same model describes both covalent and ionic bonding. 3) The valence of atoms is defined by the number of electrons in the outermost layer of the atom and by the maximal number of electrons that can be situated in the outermost layer of the atom. 4) The equalization of bond lengths and energies, and the increase of the thermal stability of chemical compounds, described as identical relative to the energy of the Lewis structures, is explained by the electron-nuclear isomerization.

Victor Gankin co-authored several monographs on oxosynthesis and theoretical chemistry, 152 scientific papers in Soviet and international journals and 129 Russian and international patents.

1959-1963 Victor led the discovery, investigation and full development of the oxosynthesis processes of C4 and C6-C8 aldehydes formation with low cobalt concentration (0.01%).

1963-1966 Victor led the discovery and laboratory investigation of 3-methylgexanol production from 2-methylpentene. Got patent 249,353 (USSR).

1966-1970 Victor led the discovery, investigation and full development of the oxosynthesis process of C4 aldehyde using novel naphtheno-evaporative scheme. Patents: NN 661,724 (Italy); 100,2691 (UK), 1,315,589 (France); 169,103; 178,814; 245,759 (USSR).

1970-1972 Victor investigated and tested on a pilot scale the novel process of esters production by oxosynthesis using the cobalt catalyst modified by piridins. Process decreased the amount of byproducts by 50% and increased the yield of normal alcohols by 20%.

1971-1974 Victor discovered, investigated and tested on a pilot scale of the novel process of α-branched acids production from olefines. Process allows to obtain individual α-acids higher than C9 able to form stable esters.

1973-1978 Victor discovered, investigated and fully developed the isoprene production from formaldehyde and isobutylene via dimethyldioxane with full catalyst recycle.

1978-1980 Victor discovered and investigated the process of the styrol production from toluene while saving the methyl group in toluene. Patents: NN 4,192,961 (USA); 1,538,670 (UK).

1980-1984 Victor discovered and investigated the novel process of high (>C15) normal dicarbonic acids production from unsaturated carbon acids.

1984-1988 Victor discovered, investigated and tested on a pilot scale the novel process of methylethyl ketone production from isobutyric aldehyde. Process obtains 2-ethylgexanol and methylethyl ketone from propylene by oxosynthesis without byproducts.

1988-1991 Victor discovered, investigated and fully developed the isoprene and dimethyl vinyl carbinol production via methyl butanediol while decreasing the manufacturing costs of both products by 24%.

== Bibliography ==
- Новая теория химических связей и химической кинетики / Виктор Ю. Ганкин, Юрий В. Ганкин; Пер. с рус. Д. Кузнецов. - Л. : МП "АСТА", 1991. - 88 с. : ил.; 21 см.; ISBN 5-85962-020-9 : Беспл.
- Twenty-first century general chemistry [Текст] : introductory level teaching guide / V. Yu. Gankin, Yu. V. Gankin. - 2nd ed. - Saint-Petersburg : Renome, 2014. - 335 с. : ил.; 21 см.; ISBN 978-5-91918-376-1
- How chemical bonds form and chemical reactions proceed / Victor Y. Gankin, Yuriy V. Gankin; Transl. from Russ.: Alexander P. Rogach. - Shrewsbury : ITC (Inst. of theoretical chemistry), Cop. 1998. - IX, 451 с. : ил., табл.; 24 см.; ISBN 0-9664143-0-6.

== Awards ==
- Medal Best Inventor of USSR
- Major Silver Medal for Achievements in Russian Industry
- 1st Mendeleev's Society Award
- Gubkin Achievement Award
- 1st Komsomol Award for Scientific Achievement
- Major Lenin Award nominee.
