= Polymethylpentene =

Poly(4-methyl-1-pentene)

Names
- IUPAC name Poly[1-(2-methylpropyl)ethylene]
- Other names Poly(4-methyl-1-pentene); PMP

Identifiers
CAS Number	25068-26-2
ChemSpider	none
CompTox Dashboard (EPA)	DTXSID001010991

Properties
Chemical formula	(C_{6}H_{12})_{n}
Molar mass	Variable
Density	0.833 g/mL
Melting point	240 °C (464 °F; 513 K)
- Except where otherwise noted, data are given for materials in their standard state (at 25 °C [77 °F], 100 kPa). verify (what is ?) Infobox references

Polymethylpentene (PMP), also known as poly(4-methyl-1-pentene). It is used for gas-permeable packaging, autoclavable medical and laboratory equipment, microwave components, and cookware. It is commonly called TPX, which is a trademark of Mitsui Chemicals.

== Production ==
Polymethylpentene is a 4-methyl-1-pentene-derived linear isotactic polyolefin and is made by Ziegler–Natta type catalysis. The commercially available grades are usually copolymers. It can be extruded and moulded (by injection moulding or blow moulding).

== Physical properties ==
Polymethylpentene melts at ≈ 235 °C. It has a relatively low density (0.84 g/cm^{3}) among plastics and is transparent. It has low moisture absorption, and exceptional acoustical and electrical properties. Its properties are reasonably similar to those of other polyolefins, although it is more brittle and more gas permeable. The polymer also has a high thermal stability, excellent dielectric characteristics and a high chemical resistance. The crystalline phase has a lower density than the amorphous phase.

== Optical properties ==
In comparison to other materials being used for operating in THz range, TPX shows optical properties with a wavelength independent refractive index of 1.460±0.005 between visible light and 100~GHz. While having a clear transmission in the THz area, TPX also shows a very wide transmission range spreading from UV to THz.

== Applications ==
- Applications include sonar covers, speaker cones, ultrasonic transducer heads, and lightweight structural parts. It is also FDA compliant for use in food processing machinery. Polymethylpentene is often used in films and coatings for gas-permeable packaging.
- Because of its high melting point and good temperature stability, polymethylpentene is used for autoclavable medical and laboratory equipment, microwave components, and cookware.
- It is also often used in electrical components e.g. LED molds because it is an excellent electrical insulator.
- TPX is a hard, solid material, which can be mechanically shaped into various optical components like lenses and windows. It is used in CO_{2} laser pumped molecular lasers as an output window because it is transparent in the whole terahertz range and totally suppresses the ~10 μm pump radiation.
- Because it has a low [ relative permittivity ],(2.12), "polymethylpentene and polysulfone [labeware] are the most transparent to microwaves."
