= Hexene =

Organic molecule with the formula C6H12

In organic chemistry, hexene is a hydrocarbon with the chemical formula C_{6}H_{12}. The prefix "hex" is derived from the fact that there are 6 carbon atoms in the molecule, while the "-ene" suffix denotes that there is an alkene present—two carbon atoms are connected via a double bond. There are several isomers of hexene, depending on the position and geometry of the double bond in the chain. One of the most common industrially useful isomers is 1-hexene, an alpha-olefin. Hexene is used as a comonomer in the production of polyethylene.

== Isomers ==
The following is a partial list of hexenes.

| Name | Structural formula | CAS Number | Melting point (°C) | Boiling point (°C) | Density (g/cm^{3}) | Refractive index (589 nm) |
|---|---|---|---|---|---|---|
| 1-hexene | | 592-41-6 | −139.76 | 63.48 | 0.6685 (25 °C) | 1.3852 (25 °C) |
| (E)-2-hexene | | 4050-45-7 | −133 | 67.9 | 0.6733 (25 °C) | 1.3936 (20 °C) |
| (Z)-2-hexene | | 7688-21-3 | −141.11 | 68.8 | 0.6824 (25 °C) | 1.3979 (20 °C) |
| (E)-3-hexene | | 13269-52-8 | −115.4 | 67.1 | 0.6772 (20 °C) | 1.3943 (20 °C) |
| (Z)-3-hexene | | 7642-09-3 | −137.8 | 66.4 | 0.6778 (20 °C) | 1.3947 (20 °C) |

There are a total of 13 different alkene isomers of hexene, excluding additional geometric (E/Z) and optical (R/S) isomers:

- hex-1-ene
- hex-2-ene (E/Z)
- hex-3-ene (E/Z)
- 2-methylpent-1-ene
- 3-methylpent-1-ene (R/S)
- 4-methylpent-1-ene
- 2-methylpent-2-ene
- 3-methylpent-2-ene (E/Z)
- 4-methylpent-2-ene (E/Z)
- 2,3-dimethylbut-1-ene
- 3,3-dimethylbut-1-ene
- 2-ethylbut-1-ene
- 2,3-dimethylbut-2-ene

== See also ==
- Cyclohexene
- Neohexene
