= ISO 2852 =

International standard

ISO 2852 Stainless steel clamp pipe couplings for the food industry was an international standard that defines a non-permanent sanitary food-grade piping interconnect method, commonly used in the food processing industry and with dairy farm equipment.

The interconnect consists of:

- a lip flange on the ends of pipes with a grooved indentation on the flange.
- a polymer sealing gasket placed between sections of pipe, squeezed between the flanges. This ring has a raised groove on both sides mating with the indentations of the two pipes on either side.
- an enclosing clamp with C-shape clamping sections that cover the outer circumference of the flanges, applying pressure to squeeze the two pipe sections together onto the sealing ring. The clamp also provides structural strength and rigidity to the pipe sections.

The combined lip flange and gasket do not impede the flow of fluids through the piping.

The clamping system may be permanent, using a hose clamp style screw and band, or it may be easily removable using a fold-over hinged clamp assembly.

ISO 2852 is withdrawn as international standard since 31 July 2018.

== Other names used in industry ==
Companies that supply products according to the specifications of ISO 2852 do not necessarily mention the ISO standard as such, instead referring to the equipment by terms common in the relevant industries or applications. Examples include:

- Tri-Clamp Fittings
- Tri-Clover Fittings
- S-clamp fitting
- Sanitary Fittings
- 3A pipe fitting (This terminology includes other types of fittings. "3-A" is a set of standards for cleanability and inspection of dairy equipment, developed by 3-A Sanitary Standards, Inc.)

== See also ==
- ASME BPE
