= 2,3-Dimethyl-1-butene =

Names
- Preferred IUPAC name 2,3-Dimethylbut-1-ene

Identifiers
CAS Number	563-78-0
3D model (JSmol)	Interactive image
ChemSpider	10775
ECHA InfoCard	100.008.421
EC Number	209-262-2
PubChem CID	11249
UNII	82885MLV85
CompTox Dashboard (EPA)	DTXSID7073195
- InChI: InChI=1S/C6H12/c1-5(2)6(3)4/h6H,1H2,2-4H3 Key: OWWIWYDDISJUMY-UHFFFAOYSA-N
- SMILES: CC(C)C(=C)C

Properties
Chemical formula	C_{6}H_{12}
Molar mass	84.162 g·mol^{−1}
Appearance	colorless liquid
Density	0.68 g/cm^{3}
Boiling point	55 °C (131 °F; 328 K)

Hazards
- GHS labelling
Pictograms	(GHS02: Flammable) (GHS07: Exclamation mark) (GHS08: Health hazard)
Signal word	Danger
Hazard statements	H203, H225
Precautionary statements	P210, P233, P240, P241, P242, P243, P261, P264, P264+P265, P271, P280, P301+P316, P302+P352, P303+P361+P353, P304+P340, P305+P351+P338, P319, P321, P331, P332+P317, P337+P317, P362+P364, P370+P378, P403+P233, P403+P235, P405, P501
- Except where otherwise noted, data are given for materials in their standard state (at 25 °C [77 °F], 100 kPa). Infobox references

2,3-Dimethyl-1-butene is an organic compound with the formula CH_{2}=C(CH_{3})CH(CH_{3})_{2}. Like the other isomers of dimethylbutene, it is a colorless liquid. Together with 2,3-dimethyl-2-butene it can be produced by dimerization of propylene. It is a precursor to the commercial fragrance tonalide.
