= ASME BPE =

ASME BPE (American Society of Mechanical Engineers: Bioprocessing Equipment) is an international Standard developed as an aid for the design and construction of equipment intended for use in the manufacturing of biopharmaceuticals. The standard is approved as an American National Standard by the ASME Board of Pressure Technologies. The first edition of this Standard was approved as an American National Standard on May 20, 1997. The most recent edition was approved by ANSI on March 21, 2022.

New editions of the standard are generally approved and published every two years.

== Purpose and Scope ==
The ASME Bioprocessing Equipment (BPE) Standard was developed to aid in the design and construction of new fluid processing equipment used in the manufacture of biopharmaceuticals, where a defined level of purity and bioburden control is required. The Standard typically applies to (a) components that are in contact with the product, raw materials, or product intermediates during manufacturing, development, or scale-up (b) systems that are a critical part of product manufacture [e.g., water-for-injection (WFI), clean steam, filtration, and intermediate product storage]. Within scope also is the design and construction of piping systems for hygienic service.

Multi-Use metallic, Multi-Use plastic and Single-Use materials of construction and design, are all covered in the scope of the 2022 edition.

New editions of the ASME BPE Standard may be used beginning with the date of issuance and become effective 6 months after the date of issuance.

The ASME BPE Standard provides requirements for systems and components that are subject to cleaning and sanitization and/or sterilization including systems that are cleaned in place (CIP’d) and/or steamed in place (SIP’d) and/or other suitable processes used in the manufacturing of biopharmaceuticals. It also provides requirements for single-use systems and components used in the above listed applications. This Standard may be used, in whole or in part, for other applications where bioburden risk is a concern. This Standard applies to: (a) new system (and component) design and fabrication (b) definition of system boundaries (c) specific metallic, polymeric, and elastomeric (e.g., seals and gaskets) materials of construction (d) component dimensions and tolerances (e) surface finishes (f) materials joining (g) examinations, inspections, and testing (h) certification

This Standard is intended to apply to new fabrication and construction. It may be used in other cases with consensus between the system owner/user, engineer, installation contractor, and inspection contractor.

Please note: This paraphrased information comes from Part GR-1 and GR-2 of the ASME BPE Standard, 2022 edition, and was condensed for brevity to a broader audience. The intent of this article is general knowledge and general information for a wider audience outside of bioprocessing and engineering. Please purchase a copy of the most recent edition for complete understanding, reference, detail, context and content.

== Structure ==
The ASME BPE is a voluntary consensus standard developed by a committee of more than 300 subject-matter experts. ASME oversees the standard’s development and approval through established policies and procedures intended to ensure a structured review process.

The Standard (2022 Edition) is split into the following Chapters and Parts. The teams that develop each Part function as working teams, to develop, approve and refine content.

== Chapter 1, Introduction, Scope, and General Requirements ==
Part GR, General Requirements

== Chapter 2, Certification ==
Part CR, Certification Requirements

== Chapter 3, Materials ==
Part MM, Metallic Materials
Part PM, Polymeric and Other Nonmetallic Materials

== Chapter 4, Design for Multiuse ==
Part SD, Systems Design for Multiuse

== Chapter 5, Process Components for Multiuse ==
Part DT, Dimensions and Tolerances for Process Components
Part PI, Process Instrumentation for Multiuse
Part MC, Components for Multiuse

== Chapter 6, Fabrication, Assembly, and Erection for Multiuse ==
Part MJ, Materials Joining for Multiuse
Part SF, Process Contact Surface Finishes for Multiuse

== Chapter 7, Design for Single-Use ==
Part SU, Systems Design for Single-Use

== Chapter 8, Process Components for Single-Use ==
Part SC, Components for Single-Use

== Chapter 9, Fabrication, Assembly, and Erection for Single-Use ==
Part SJ, Joining Methods for Single-Use

== How to get involved ==
The ASME BPE meets three times a year in person, but offline meetings occur to develop and refine existing content. Unless otherwise stated, the sessions are free and open to all, and volunteers are welcome. ASME posts the details for all meetings on their website; the link is also below.

== False claims of codification ==
At least as early as April 19, 2011, ASME published a web page which falsely indicated the ASME BPE standard had been adopted by the State of California. The statement was based upon California's codification of Section 443, Group L—known as the "L Occupancy"—within Part 1 of the California Building Code. The web page claimed that the "L Occupancy" referenced the ASME BPE standard, but no such reference appears as described. A codification of the ASME BPE standard via such a reference is generally precluded by the building code's own requirement that any content that is not a building standard as defined in California's Health and Safety Code Section 18909 shall not be construed as part of the provisions of the California Building Code (Part 1, Chapter 1, Section 1.1.6).

The web page has been removed.

== See also ==
- ISO 2852
- Single use systems
