= 4-Methyl-1-pentene =

- Skeletal formula of 4-methyl-1-pentene

- Skeletal formula of 4-methyl-1-pentene with some implicit hydrogens shown

Names
- Preferred IUPAC name 4-Methylpent-1-ene
- Other names 4-Methyl-1-pentene

Identifiers
CAS Number	691-37-2
3D model (JSmol)	Interactive image
Beilstein Reference	1731096
ChemSpider	12201
ECHA InfoCard	100.010.656
EC Number	211-720-1
PubChem CID	12724
UNII	X10HRJ2Y7W
UN number	3295
CompTox Dashboard (EPA)	DTXSID001010991 DTXSID3061001, DTXSID001010991
- InChI: InChI=1S/C6H12/c1-4-5-6(2)3/h4,6H,1,5H2,2-3H3 Key: WSSSPWUEQFSQQG-UHFFFAOYSA-N
- SMILES: CC(C)CC=C

Properties
Chemical formula	C_{6}H_{12}
Molar mass	84.162 g·mol^{−1}
Density	665 mg cm^{−3}
Melting point	−173 to −113 °C; −280 to −172 °F; 100 to 160 K
Boiling point	54 °C; 129 °F; 327 K
Vapor pressure	30.7 kPa (at 20 °C)

Thermochemistry
Std enthalpy of formation (Δ_{f}H^{⦵}_{298})	−78.86 to −77.58 kJ mol^{−1}
Std enthalpy of combustion (Δ_{c}H^{⦵}_{298})	−3.99836 to −3.99728 MJ mol^{−1}

Hazards
- GHS labelling
Pictograms	(GHS02: Flammable) (GHS08: Health hazard)
Signal word	Danger
Hazard statements	H225, H304
Precautionary statements	P210, P301+P310, P331
NFPA 704 (fire diamond)	2 4 1
Flash point	−7 °C (19 °F; 266 K)
Autoignition temperature	300 °C (572 °F; 573 K)
- Except where otherwise noted, data are given for materials in their standard state (at 25 °C [77 °F], 100 kPa). verify (what is ?) Infobox references

4-Methyl-1-pentene is used as a monomer for olefin polymerisation. The resulting polymer is poly(4-methyl-1-pentene).
