= Neohexene =

Hydrocarbon compound ((CH3)3CCH=CH2)

Names
- Preferred IUPAC name 3,3-Dimethylbut-1-ene
- Other names 3,3-Dimethyl-1-butene

Identifiers
CAS Number	558-37-2
3D model (JSmol)	Interactive image
ChemSpider	10737
ECHA InfoCard	100.008.361
EC Number	209-195-9
PubChem CID	11210
UNII	01ZB73D2KK
CompTox Dashboard (EPA)	DTXSID1027211
- InChI: InChI=1/C6H12/c1-5-6(2,3)4/h5H,1H2,2-4H Key: PKXHXOTZMFCXSH-UHFFFAOYSA-N
- SMILES: CC(C)(C)C=C

Properties
Chemical formula	C_{6}H_{12}
Molar mass	84.162 g·mol^{−1}
Appearance	colorless liquid
Density	0.685 g mL^{−1}
Boiling point	41 °C (106 °F; 314 K)
- Except where otherwise noted, data are given for materials in their standard state (at 25 °C [77 °F], 100 kPa). Infobox references

Neohexene is the hydrocarbon compound with the chemical formula (CH_{3})_{3}CCH=CH_{2}. It is a colorless liquid, with properties similar to other hexenes. It is a precursor to commercial synthetic musk perfumes.

== Preparation and reactions ==
Neohexene is prepared by ethenolysis of diisobutene, an example of a metathesis reaction:

(CH_{3})_{3}C-CH=C(CH_{3})_{2} + CH_{2}=CH_{2} → (CH_{3})_{3}C-CH=CH_{2} + (CH_{3})_{2}C=CH_{2}

It is a building block to synthetic musks by its reaction with p-cymene. It is also used in the industrial preparation of terbinafine.

In the study of C-H activation, neohexene is often used as a hydrogen acceptor.
