= Syringe driver =

Medical device

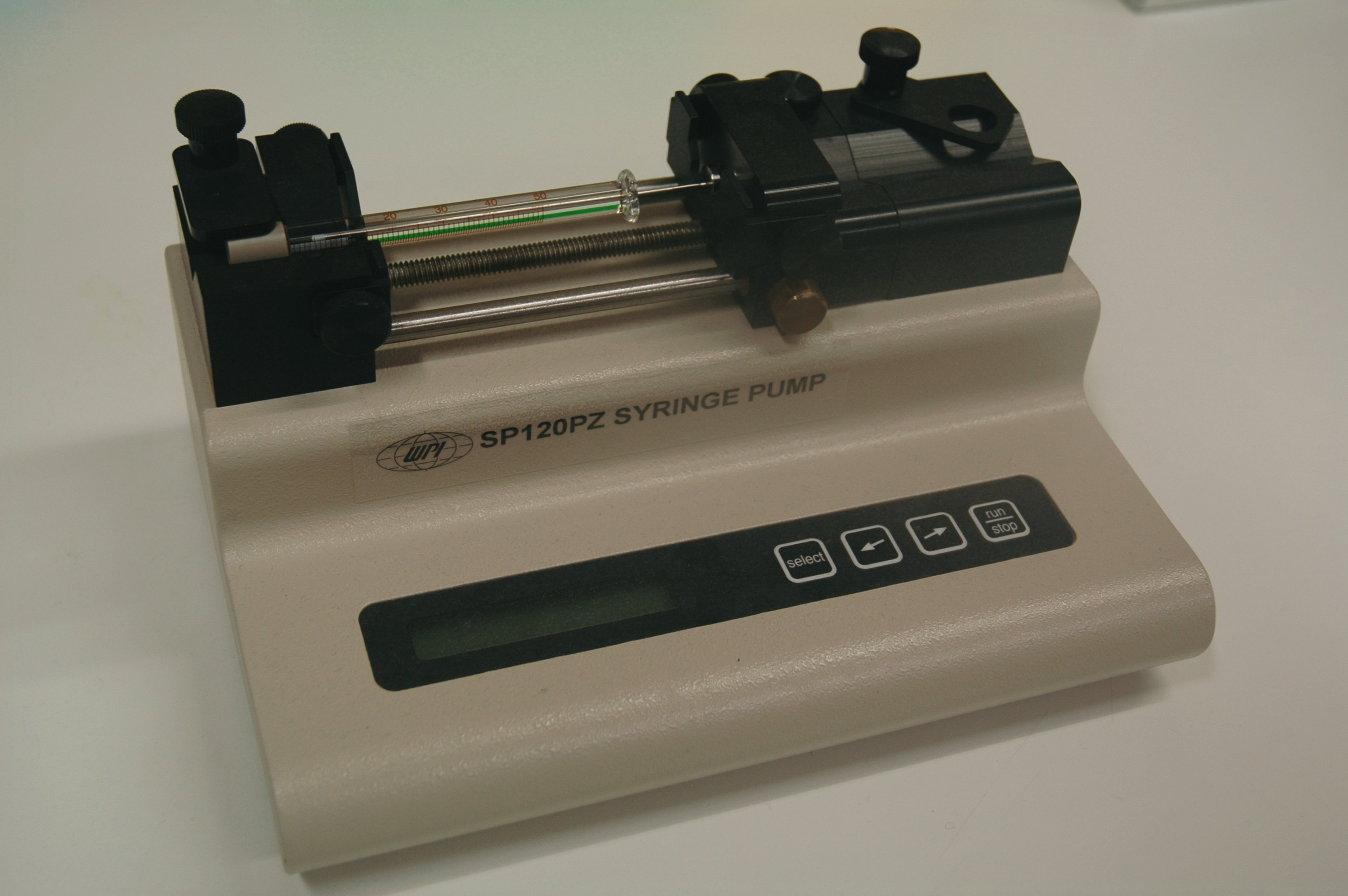
A syringe pump for laboratory use. World Precision Instruments (WPI) SP120PZ.

A syringe driver, also known as a syringe pump, is a small infusion pump, used to gradually administer small amounts of fluid (with or without medication) to a patient or for use in chemical and biomedical research. Some syringe drivers can both infuse and withdraw solutions.

== Uses ==
Syringe drivers can be used for electrospinning, electrospraying, microdialysis, microfluidics, dispensing/dilution, tissue perfusion, and fluid circulation.

=== Intravenous therapy ===
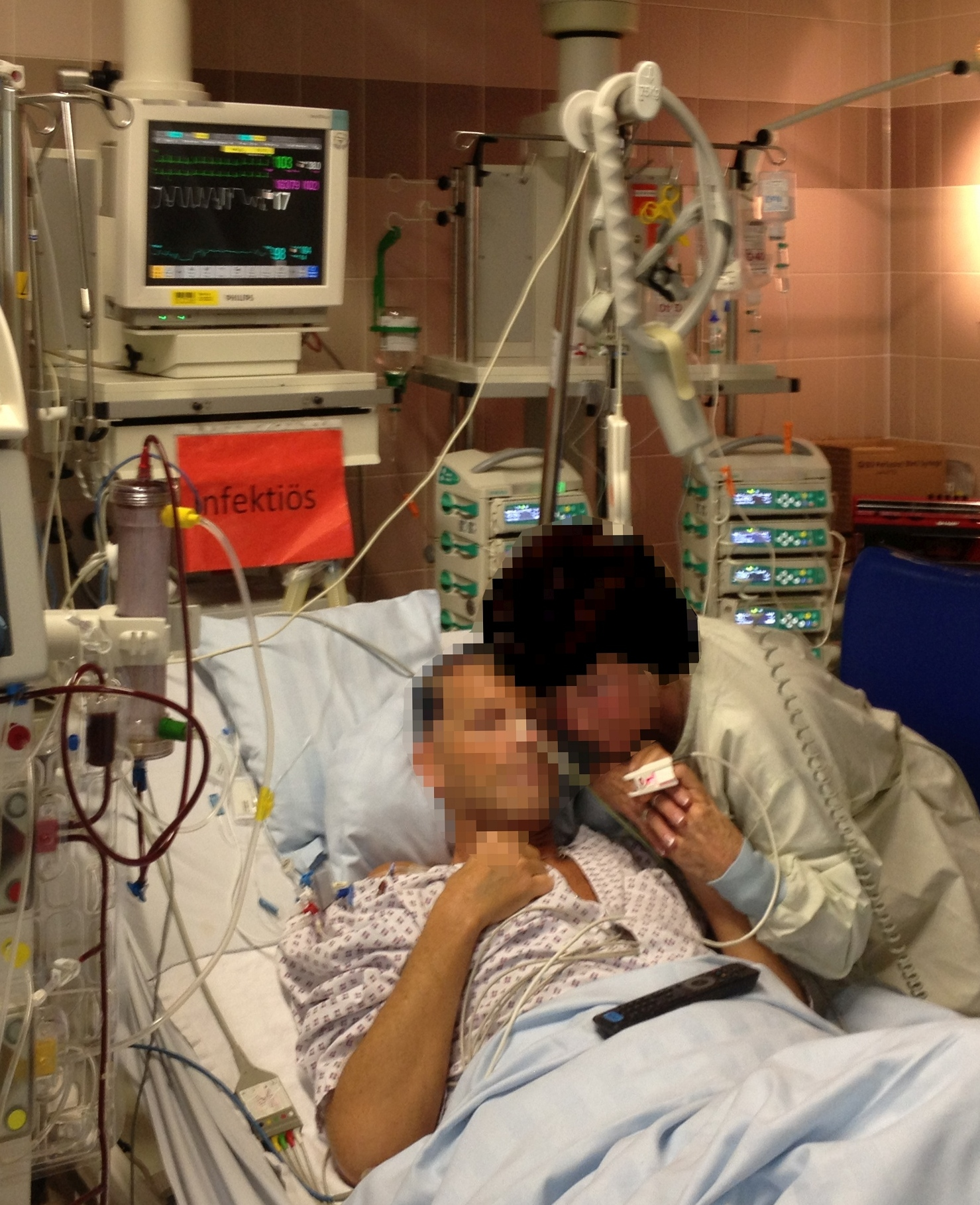
This patient of an intensive care unit of a German hospital (2015) could not eat due to a prior surgery of the abdominal region which had led, via a chain reaction of negative events, to a severe sepsis and an emergency surgery. He received antibiotics, parenteral nutrition and pain killers, amongst other substances, via automated injection employing circa 8 syringe drivers (2 staples in background on the right).

Syringe drivers are useful for delivering intravenous (IV) therapies over several minutes. They infuse solutions at a constant rate. In the case of a medication which should be slowly pushed in over the course of several minutes, this device saves staff time and reduces medical errors. It is useful for patients who cannot take medicines orally (such as those with difficulty swallowing), and for medications too harmful to be taken orally.

==== Palliative care ====
Syringe drivers are particularly useful in palliative care, to continuously administer analgesics (painkillers), antiemetics (medication to suppress nausea and vomiting) and other drugs. This prevents periods during which medication levels in the blood are too high or too low, and avoids the use of multiple tablets. As medication is administered subcutaneously, the area of administration is practically limitless, although edema may interfere with the action of some drugs.

=== Research ===
Syringe pumps are useful in microfluidic applications, such as microreactor design and testing, and also in chemistry for slow incorporation of a fixed volume of fluid into a solution. In enzyme kinetics studies, syringe drivers can be used to observe rapid kinetics as part of a stopped flow apparatus. They are also sometimes used as laboratory media dispensers. Some reactions exploiting the high dilution principle use syringe pumps.
