= Effective molarity =

Ratio used in chemistry

In chemistry, the effective molarity (denoted EM) is defined as the ratio between the first-order rate constant of an intramolecular reaction and the second-order rate constant of the corresponding intermolecular reaction (kinetic effective molarity) or the ratio between the equilibrium constant of an intramolecular reaction and the equilibrium constant of the corresponding intermolecular reaction (thermodynamic effective molarity).

$$EM_{kinetic} = {k_{intramolecular} \over k_{intermolecular}}$$

$$EM_{thermo} = {K_{intramolecular} \over K_{intermolecular}}$$

EM has the dimension of concentration. High EM values always indicate greater ease of intramolecular processes over the corresponding intermolecular ones. Effective molarities can be used to get a deeper understanding of the effects of intramolecularity on reaction courses.

== See also ==
- Cyclic compound
- Intramolecular reaction
- Macrocycle
- Polymerization
