= High dilution principle =

Principle in organic chemistry

In organic chemistry, the high dilution principle is a strategy for some macrocyclization reactions, i.e. the synthesis of macrocycles. Unlike the synthesis of 5- and 6-membered rings, the preparation of larger rings competes unfavorably with polymerization reactions. Polymers arise from coupling of long chain precursors. Such reactions are disfavored when the acyclic compounds are dilute. Although high dilution reactions can be conducted in a batch reactor with large volumes of solvent, an alternative practical implementation entails slow addition of reactants, under conditions that the reactants are more rapidly consumed than the rate of addition. Typically, additions use one or more syringe pumps. Illustrative is the synthesis of thiacyclopentadecane from 1,14-dibromotetradecane and sodium sulfide in 45% yield:

BrCH_{2}(CH_{2})_{12}CH_{2}Br + Na_{2}S → (CH_{2})_{14}S + 2 NaBr

A range of specialized glassware and instrumentation are often used, e.g. syringe pumps.
