= Enyne metathesis =

Organic reaction

An enyne metathesis is an organic reaction taking place between an alkyne and an alkene with a metal carbene catalyst forming a butadiene. This reaction is a variation of olefin metathesis.

The general scheme is given by scheme 1:

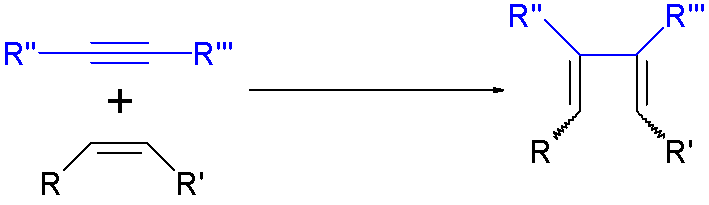

When the reaction is intramolecular (in an enyne) it is called ring-closing enyne metathesis or RCEYM (scheme 2):

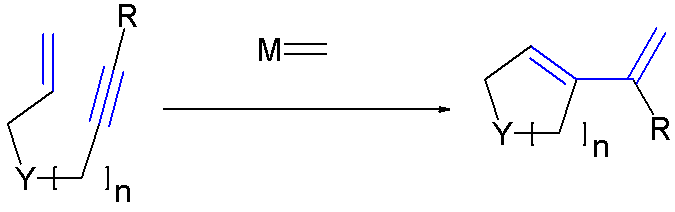

with Y representing oxygen or nitrogen and n an integer.

The reaction was first described in 1985 with the conversion of biphenyl 3.1 to a phenanthrene in scheme 3:

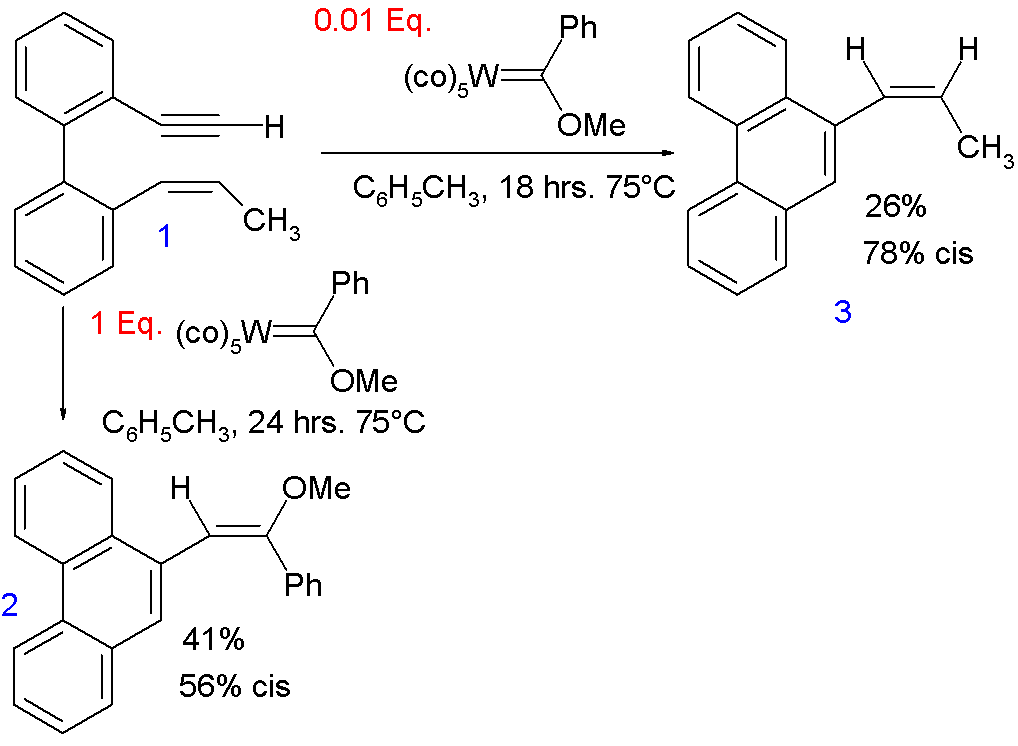

The carbene is a tungsten carbonyl when used in stoichiometric amounts (1 equivalent) yields 41% of the phenanthrene 3.2 and when used in catalytic amounts phenanthrene 3.3. The stereoselectivity of this reaction is large with the metal atom exclusively adding to one of the alkyne carbon atoms in the initial reaction step.

== Reaction mechanism ==
The reaction mechanism for this reaction is outlined in scheme 4:

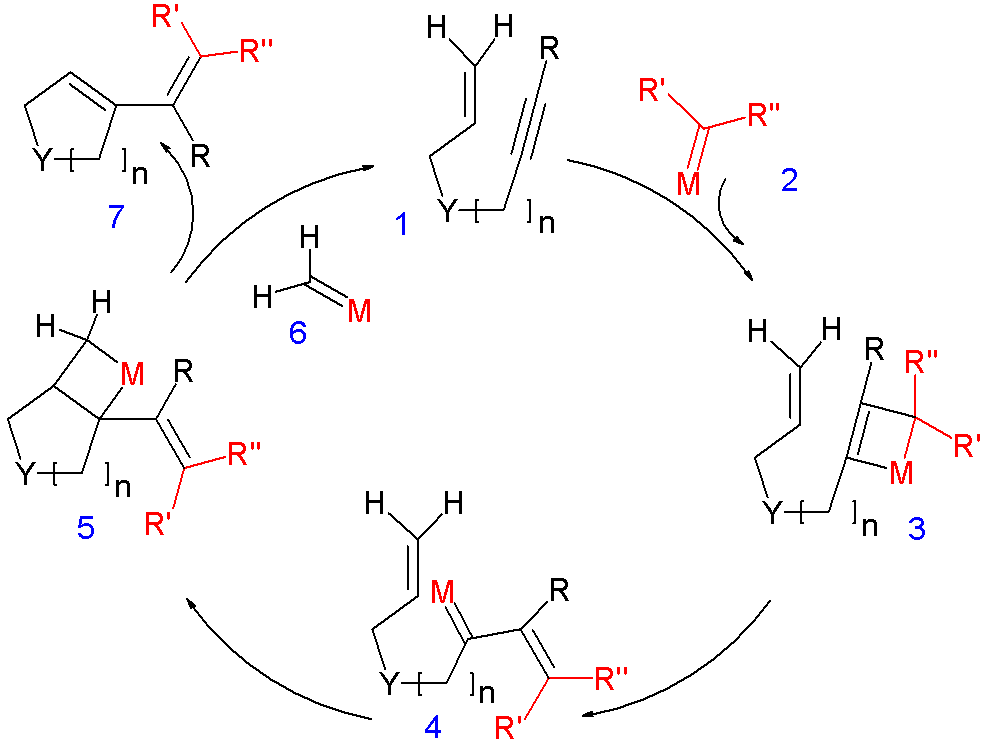

In the first catalytic cycle the alkyne group of enyne 4.1 forms a metallacyclobutene intermediate 4.3 with carbene 4.2 with R' and R' ' any organic group required to stabilized it. In the next step the metathesis step is reversed with formation of a new double bond and a new carbenic center in 4.4. The ring-closing step takes place when this center reacts with the alkene group to a metallacyclobutane 4.5 as in a regular olefin metathesis reaction. The butadiene group forms in the last step with expulsion of a new methylene carbene, initiating the next cycle but now with R' = H and R' ' = H.

This is the proposed "yne-then-ene" mechanism. Evidence for an "ene-then-yne" pathway is beginning to emerge, especially for ruthenium based catalytic systems.

The driving force for this conversion is the formation of a thermodynamically stable conjugated butadiene.

== Scope ==
Enyne metathesis reactions are accelerated by ethylene as is demonstrated in the reaction displayed in scheme 5:

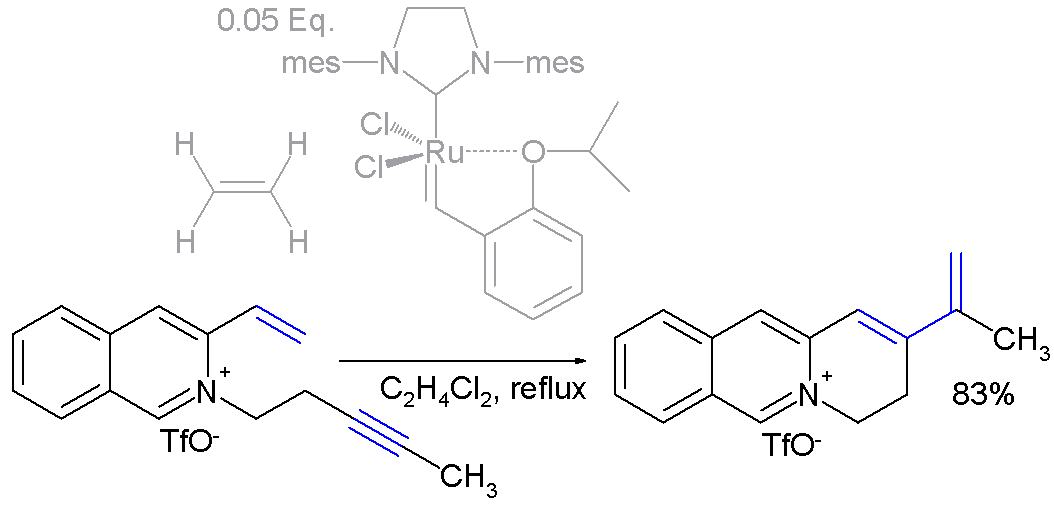

In this reaction with the Hoveyda–Grubbs catalyst, ethylene converts the alkyne group to the corresponding diene group before the reaction with the alkene group.
