= Biomaterial =

Substance engineered for biological medical use

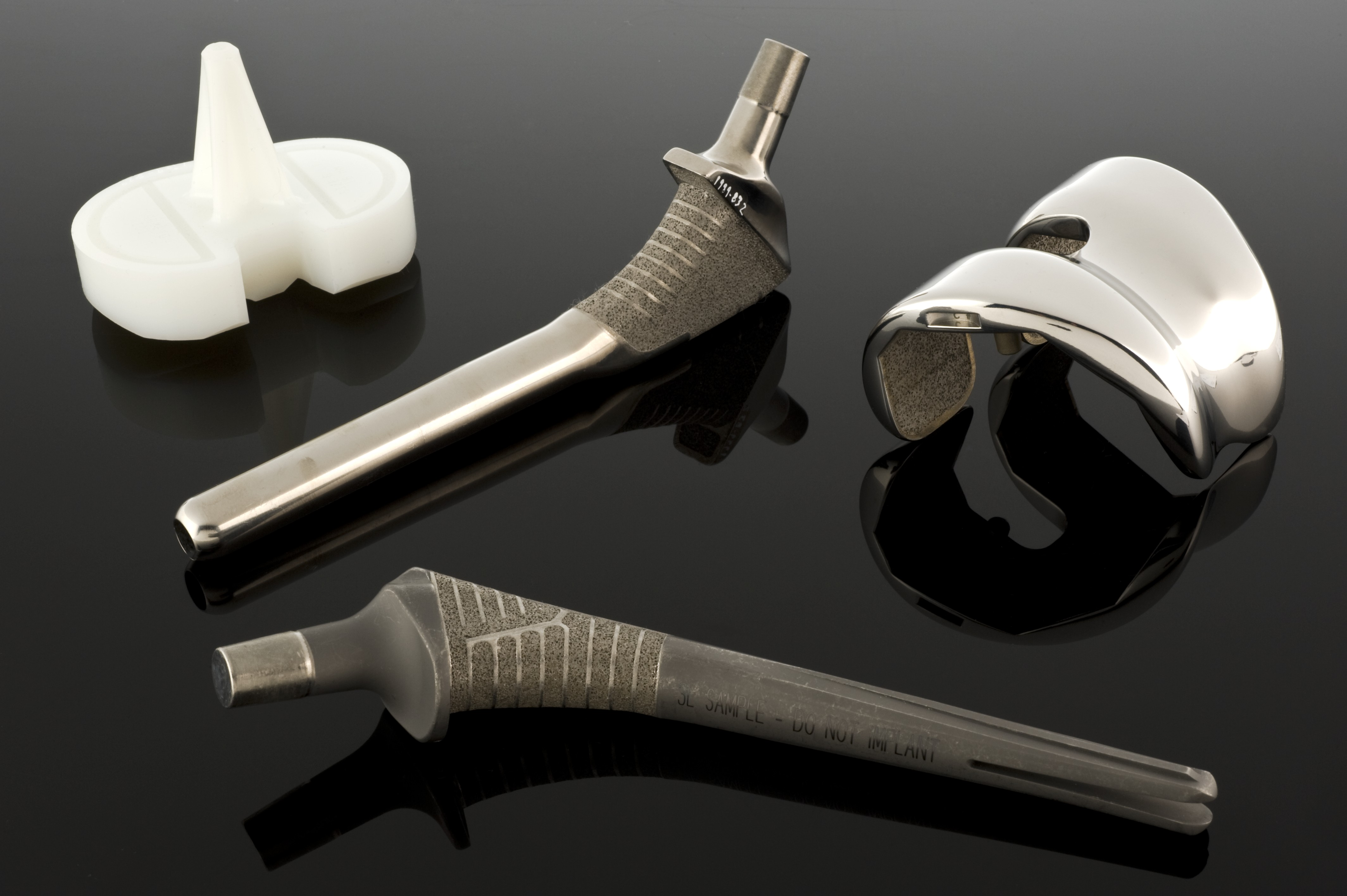
A hip implant is an example of an application of biomaterials

A biomaterial is a substance that has been engineered to interact with biological systems for a medical purpose – either a therapeutic (treat, augment, repair, or replace a tissue function of the body) or a diagnostic one. The corresponding field of study is called biomaterials science or biomaterials engineering. It has experienced steady growth over its history, with many companies investing large amounts of money into the development of new products. Biomaterials science encompasses elements of medicine, biology, chemistry, tissue engineering and materials science.

A biomaterial is different from a biological material, such as bone, that is produced by a biological system. However, "biomaterial" and "biological material" are often used interchangeably. Further, the word "bioterial" has been proposed as a potential alternate word for biologically produced materials such as bone, or fungal biocomposites. Additionally, care should be exercised in defining a biomaterial as biocompatible, since it is application-specific. A biomaterial that is biocompatible or suitable for one application may not be biocompatible in another.

Nanobiomaterials are a specialization of nanomaterials; nanobiomaterials are biomaterials in the nanoscale typically used in the field of nanomedicine since they can both actively interact with biological systems and mimic biological structures.

IUPAC definition

Material exploited in contact with living tissues, organisms, or microorganisms. (Note: The notion of exploitation includes utility for applications and for fundamental research to understand reciprocal perturbations as well.) (Note: The definition "non-viable material used in a medical device, intended to interact with biological systems" recommended in ref. cannot be extended to the environmental field where people mean "material of natural origin".) (Note: This general term should not be confused with the terms biopolymer or biomacromolecule. The use of "polymeric biomaterial" is recommended when one deals with polymer or polymer device of therapeutic or biological interest.)

== Introduction ==
Biomaterials can be derived either from nature or synthesized in the laboratory using a variety of chemical approaches utilizing metallic components, polymers, ceramics or composite materials. They are often used and/or adapted for a medical application, and thus comprise the whole or part of a living structure or biomedical device which performs, augments, or replaces a natural function. Such functions may be relatively passive, like being used for a heart valve, or may be bioactive with a more interactive functionality, such as hydroxy-apatite coated hip implants. Biomaterials are also commonly used in dental applications, surgery, and drug delivery. For example, a construct with impregnated pharmaceutical products can be placed into the body, which permits the prolonged release of a drug over an extended period of time. A biomaterial may also be an autograft, allograft or xenograft used as a transplant material.

Biomaterials science is a multi-disciplinary field. It involves disciplines including engineering, materials science, chemistry, biochemistry, and medicine. This field is still expanding along with the discoveries made in the field. The term biomaterial did not exist 60 years ago. Biomaterials have clinical applications in skeletal systems, tissue engineering, dentistry and orthopedics.

== Bioactivity ==
The ability of an engineered biomaterial to induce a physiological response that is supportive of the biomaterial's function and performance is known as bioactivity. Most commonly, in bioactive glasses and bioactive ceramics this term refers to the ability of implanted materials to bond well with surrounding tissue in either osteo conductive or osseo productive roles. Bone implant materials are often designed to promote bone growth while dissolving into surrounding body fluid. Thus for many biomaterials good biocompatibility along with good strength and dissolution rates are desirable. Commonly, bioactivity of biomaterials is gauged by the surface biomineralization in which a native layer of hydroxyapatite is formed at the surface. These days, the development of clinically useful biomaterials is greatly enhanced by the advent of computational routines that can predict the molecular effects of biomaterials in a therapeutic setting based on limited in vitro experimentation.

== Self-assembly ==
Self-assembly is the most common term in use in the modern scientific community to describe the spontaneous aggregation of particles (atoms, molecules, colloids, micelles, etc.) without the influence of any external forces. Large groups of such particles are known to assemble themselves into thermodynamically stable, structurally well-defined arrays, quite reminiscent of one of the seven crystal systems found in metallurgy and mineralogy (e.g., face-centered cubic, body-centered cubic, etc.). The fundamental difference in equilibrium structure is in the spatial scale of the unit cell (lattice parameter) in each particular case.

Molecular self assembly is found widely in biological systems and provides the basis of a wide variety of complex biological structures. This includes an emerging class of mechanically superior biomaterials based on microstructural features and designs found in nature. Thus, self-assembly is also emerging as a new strategy in chemical synthesis and nanotechnology. Molecular crystals, liquid crystals, colloids, micelles, emulsions, phase-separated polymers, thin films and self-assembled monolayers all represent examples of the types of highly ordered structures, which are obtained using these techniques. The distinguishing feature of these methods is self-organization.

== Structural hierarchy ==
Nearly all materials could be seen as hierarchically structured, since the changes in spatial scale bring about different mechanisms of deformation and damage. However, in biological materials, this hierarchical organization is inherent to the microstructure. One of the first examples of this, in the history of structural biology, is the early X-ray scattering work on the hierarchical structure of hair and wool by Astbury and Woods. In bone, for example, collagen is the building block of the organic matrix, a triple helix with diameter of 1.5 nm. These tropocollagen molecules are intercalated with the mineral phase (hydroxyapatite, calcium phosphate) forming fibrils that curl into helicoids of alternating directions. These "osteons" are the basic building blocks of bones, with the volume fraction distribution between organic and mineral phase being about 60/40.

In another level of complexity, the hydroxyapatite crystals are mineral platelets that have a diameter of approximately 70 to 100 nm and thickness of 1 nm. They originally nucleate at the gaps between collagen fibrils.

Similarly, the hierarchy of abalone shell begins at the nanolevel, with an organic layer having a thickness of 20 to 30 nm. This layer proceeds with single crystals of aragonite (a polymorph of CaCO_{3}) consisting of "bricks" with dimensions of 0.5 and finishing with layers approximately 0.3 mm (mesostructure).

Crabs are arthropods, whose carapace is made of a mineralized hard component (exhibits brittle fracture) and a softer organic component composed primarily of chitin. The brittle component is arranged in a helical pattern. Each of these mineral "rods" (1 μm diameter) contains chitin–protein fibrils with approximately 60 nm diameter. These fibrils are made of 3 nm diameter canals that link the interior and exterior of the shell.

== Applications ==
Biomaterials are used in:

1. Joint replacements
2. Bone plates
3. Intraocular lenses (IOLs) for eye surgery
4. Bone cement
5. Artificial ligaments and tendons
6. Dental implants for tooth fixation
7. Blood vessel prostheses
8. Heart valves
9. Skin repair devices (artificial tissue)
10. Cochlear replacements
11. Contact lenses
12. Breast implants
13. Drug delivery mechanisms
14. Sustainable materials
15. Vascular grafts
16. Stents
17. Nerve conduits
18. Surgical sutures, clips, and staples for wound closure
19. Pins and screws for fracture stabilisation
20. Surgical mesh

Biomaterials must be compatible with the body, and there are often issues of biocompatibility, which must be resolved before a product can be placed on the market and used in a clinical setting. Because of this, biomaterials are usually subjected to the same requirements as those undergone by new drug therapies. All manufacturing companies are also required to ensure traceability of all of their products, so that if a defective product is discovered, others in the same batch may be traced.

=== Bone grafts ===
Calcium sulfate (its α- and β-hemihydrates) is a well known biocompatible material that is widely used as a bone graft substitute in dentistry or as its binder, in orthopedic applications such as fractures, osteomyelitis and congenital diseases, in tissue engineering and spinal applications.

=== Heart valves ===
In the United States, 49% of the 250,000 valve replacement procedures performed annually involve a mechanical valve implant. The most widely used valve is a bileaflet disc heart valve or St. Jude valve. The mechanics involve two semicircular discs moving back and forth, with both allowing the flow of blood as well as the ability to form a seal against backflow. The valve is coated with pyrolytic carbon and secured to the surrounding tissue with a mesh of woven fabric called Dacron (du Pont's trade name for polyethylene terephthalate). The mesh allows for the body's tissue to grow, while incorporating the valve.

=== Skin repair ===
Most of the time, artificial tissue is grown from the patient's own cells. However, when the damage is so extreme that it is impossible to use the patient's own cells, artificial tissue cells are grown. The difficulty is in finding a scaffold that the cells can grow and organize on. The characteristics of the scaffold must be that it is biocompatible, cells can adhere to the scaffold, mechanically strong and biodegradable. One successful scaffold is a copolymer of lactic acid and glycolic acid.

== Properties ==
As discussed previously, biomaterials are used in medical devices to treat, assist, or replace a function within the human body. The application of a specific biomaterial must combine the necessary composition, material properties, structure, and desired in vivo reaction in order to perform the desired function. Categorizations of different desired properties are defined in order to maximize functional results.

=== Host response ===
Host response is defined as the "response of the host organism (local and systemic) to the implanted material or device". Most materials will have a reaction when in contact with the human body. The success of a biomaterial relies on the host tissue's reaction with the foreign material. Specific reactions between the host tissue and the biomaterial can be generated through the biocompatibility of the material.

==== Biomaterial and tissue interactions ====
The in vivo functionality and longevity of any implantable medical device is affected by the body's response to the foreign material. The body undergoes a cascade of processes defined under the foreign body response (FBR) in order to protect the host from the foreign material. The interactions between the device upon the host tissue/blood as well as the host tissue/blood upon the device must be understood in order to prevent complications and device failure.

Tissue injury caused by device implantation causes inflammatory and healing responses during FBR. The inflammatory response occurs within two time periods: the acute phase, and the chronic phase. The acute phase occurs during the initial hours to days of implantation, and is identified by fluid and protein exudation along with a neutrophilic reaction. During the acute phase, the body attempts to clean and heal the wound by delivering excess blood, proteins, and monocytes are called to the site. Continued inflammation leads to the chronic phase, which can be categorized by the presence of monocytes, macrophages, and lymphocytes. In addition, blood vessels and connective tissue form in order to heal the wounded area.

=== Compatibility ===
Biocompatibility is related to the behavior of biomaterials in various environments under various chemical and physical conditions. The term may refer to specific properties of a material without specifying where or how the material is to be used. For example, a material may elicit little or no immune response in a given organism, and may or may not able to integrate with a particular cell type or tissue. Immuno-informed biomaterial that direct the immune response rather than attempting to circumvent the process is one approach that shows promise. The ambiguity of the term reflects the ongoing development of insights into "how biomaterials interact with the human body" and eventually "how those interactions determine the clinical success of a medical device (such as pacemaker or hip replacement)". Modern medical devices and prostheses are often made of more than one material, so it might not always be sufficient to talk about the biocompatibility of a specific material. Surgical implantation of a biomaterial into the body triggers an organism-inflammatory reaction with the associated healing of the damaged tissue. Depending upon the composition of the implanted material, the surface of the implant, the mechanism of fatigue, and chemical decomposition there are several other reactions possible. These can be local as well as systemic. These include immune response, foreign body reaction with the isolation of the implant with a vascular connective tissue, possible infection, and impact on the lifespan of the implant. Graft-versus-host disease is an auto- and alloimmune disorder, exhibiting a variable clinical course. It can manifest in either acute or chronic form, affecting multiple organs and tissues and causing serious complications in clinical practice, both during transplantation and implementation of biocompatible materials.

==== Toxicity ====
A biomaterial should perform its intended function within the living body without negatively affecting other bodily tissues and organs. In order to prevent unwanted organ and tissue interactions, biomaterials should be non-toxic. The toxicity of a biomaterial refers to the substances that are emitted from the biomaterial while in vivo. A biomaterial should not give off anything to its environment unless it is intended to do so. Nontoxicity means that biomaterial is: noncarcinogenic, nonpyrogenic, hypoallergenic, blood compatible, and noninflammatory. However, a biomaterial can be designed to include toxicity for an intended purpose. For example, application of toxic biomaterial is studied during in vivo and in vitro cancer immunotherapy testing. Toxic biomaterials offer an opportunity to manipulate and control cancer cells. One recent study states: "Advanced nanobiomaterials, including liposomes, polymers, and silica, play a vital role in the codelivery of drugs and immunomodulators. These nanobiomaterial-based delivery systems could effectively promote antitumor immune responses and simultaneously reduce toxic adverse effects." This is a prime example of how the biocompatibility of a biomaterial can be altered to produce any desired function.

==== Biodegradable biomaterials ====
Biodegradable biomaterials refers to materials that are degradable through natural enzymatic reactions. The application of biodegradable synthetic polymers began in the later 1960s. Biodegradable materials have an advantage over other materials, as they have lower risk of harmful effects long term. In addition to ethical advancements using biodegradable materials, they also improve biocompatibility for materials used for implantation. Several properties including biocompatibility are important when considering different biodegradable biomaterials. Biodegradable biomaterials can be synthetic or natural depending on their source and type of extracellular matrix (ECM).

==== Biocompatible plastics ====
Some of the most commonly used biocompatible materials (or biomaterials) are polymers due to their inherent flexibility and tunable mechanical properties. Medical devices made of plastics are often made of a select few including: cyclic olefin polymer (COP), cyclic olefin copolymer (COC), polycarbonate (PC), polyetherimide (PEI), medical grade polyvinylchloride (PVC), polyethersulfone (PES), polyethylene (PE), polyetheretherketone (PEEK) and even polypropylene (PP). To ensure biocompatibility, there are a series of regulated tests that material must pass to be certified for use. These include the United States Pharmacopoeia IV (USP Class IV) Biological Reactivity Test and the International Standards Organization 10993 (ISO 10993) Biological Evaluation of Medical Devices. The main objective of biocompatibility tests is to quantify the acute and chronic toxicity of material and determine any potential adverse effects during use conditions, thus the tests required for a given material are dependent on its end-use (i.e. blood, central nervous system, etc.).

=== Surface and bulk properties ===
Two properties that have a large effect on the functionality of a biomaterial is the surface and bulk properties.

Bulk properties refers to the physical and chemical properties that compose the biomaterial for its entire lifetime. They can be specifically generated to mimic the physiochemical properties of the tissue that the material is replacing. They are mechanical properties that are generated from a material's atomic and molecular construction.

Important bulk properties:

- Chemical Composition
- Microstructure
- Elasticity
- Tensile Strength
- Density
- Hardness
- Electrical Conductivity
- Thermal Conductivity

Surface properties refers to the chemical and topographical features on the surface of the biomaterial that will have direct interaction with the host blood/tissue. Surface engineering and modification allows clinicians to better control the interactions of a biomaterial with the host living system. The surface of biomaterials is then considered important as it is involved in many important interactions of the material with, for instance cells surrounding it. This is related to the cellular response that will occur when the material is inserted into the body. There are many surface analysis tools that are used in the field of biomaterials science such as Scanning Electron Microscopy, which is considered important as it can predict the failure or success of a medical device.

Important surface properties:

- Wettability (surface energy)
- Surface chemistry
- Surface textures (smooth/rough)
  - Topographical factors including: size, shape, alignment, structure determine the roughness of a material.
- Surface Tension
- Surface Charge

=== Mechanical properties ===
In addition to a material being certified as biocompatible, biomaterials must be engineered specifically to their target application within a medical device. This is especially important in terms of mechanical properties which govern the way that a given biomaterial behaves. One of the most relevant material parameters is the Young's Modulus, E, which describes a material's elastic response to stresses. The Young's Moduli of the tissue and the device that is being coupled to it must closely match for optimal compatibility between device and body, whether the device is implanted or mounted externally. Matching the elastic modulus makes it possible to limit movement and delamination at the biointerface between implant and tissue as well as avoiding stress concentration that can lead to mechanical failure. Other important properties are the tensile and compressive strengths which quantify the maximum stresses a material can withstand before breaking and may be used to set stress limits that a device may be subject to within or external to the body. Depending on the application, it may be desirable for a biomaterial to have high strength so that it is resistant to failure when subjected to a load, however in other applications it may be beneficial for the material to be low strength. There is a careful balance between strength and stiffness that determines how robust to failure the biomaterial device is. Typically, as the elasticity of the biomaterial increases, the ultimate tensile strength will decrease and vice versa. One application where a high-strength material is undesired is in neural probes; if a high-strength material is used in these applications the tissue will always fail before the device does (under applied load) because the Young's Modulus of the dura mater and cerebral tissue is on the order of 500 Pa. When this happens, irreversible damage to the brain can occur, thus the biomaterial must have an elastic modulus less than or equal to brain tissue and a low tensile strength if an applied load is expected.

For implanted biomaterials that may experience temperature fluctuations, e.g., dental implants, ductility is important. The material must be ductile for a similar reason that the tensile strength cannot be too high, ductility allows the material to bend without fracture and also prevents the concentration of stresses in the tissue when the temperature changes. The material property of toughness is also important for dental implants as well as any other rigid, load-bearing implant such as a replacement hip joint. Toughness describes the material's ability to deform under applied stress without fracturing and having a high toughness allows biomaterial implants to last longer within the body, especially when subjected to large stress or cyclically loaded stresses, like the stresses applied to a hip joint during running.

For medical devices that are implanted or attached to the skin, another important property requiring consideration is the flexural rigidity, D. Flexural rigidity will determine how well the device surface can maintain conformal contact with the tissue surface, which is especially important for devices that are measuring tissue motion (strain), electrical signals (impedance), or are designed to stick to the skin without delaminating, as in epidermal electronics. Since flexural rigidity depends on the thickness of the material, h, to the third power (h^{3}), it is very important that a biomaterial can be formed into thin layers in the previously mentioned applications where conformality is paramount.

== Structure ==
The molecular composition of a biomaterial determines the physical and chemical properties of a biomaterial. These compositions create complex structures that allow the biomaterial to function, and therefore are necessary to define and understand in order to develop a biomaterial. biomaterials can be designed to replicate natural organisms, a process known as biomimetics. The structure of a biomaterial can be observed at different levels to better understand a materials properties and function.

=== Atomic structure ===
Rutherford model of lithium-7's atomic structure

The arrangement of atoms and ions within a material is one of the most important structural properties of a biomaterial. The atomic structure of a material can be viewed at different levels, the sub atomic level, atomic or molecular level, as well as the ultra-structure created by the atoms and molecules. Intermolecular forces between the atoms and molecules that compose the material will determine its material and chemical properties.

The sub atomic level observes the electrical structure of an individual atom to define its interactions with other atoms and molecules. The molecular structure observes the arrangement of atoms within the material. Finally the ultra-structure observes the 3-D structure created from the atomic and molecular structures of the material. The solid-state of a material is characterized by the intramolecular bonds between the atoms and molecules that comprise the material. Types of intramolecular bonds include: ionic bonds, covalent bonds, and metallic bonds. These bonds will dictate the physical and chemical properties of the material, as well as determine the type of material (ceramic, metal, or polymer).

=== Microstructure ===
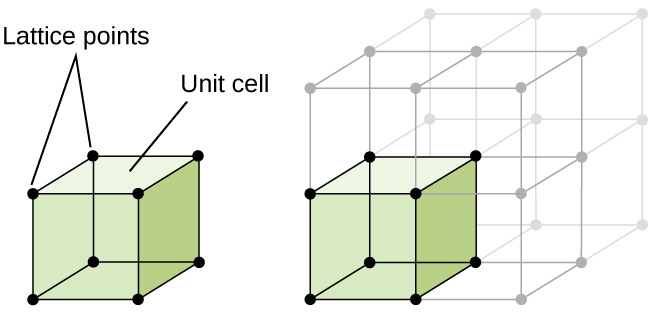
A unit cell shows the locations of lattice points repeating in all directions.

The microstructure of a material refers to the structure of an object, organism, or material as viewed at magnifications exceeding 25 times. It is composed of the different phases of form, size, and distribution of grains, pores, precipitates, etc. The majority of solid microstructures are crystalline, however some materials such as certain polymers will not crystallize when in the solid state.

==== Crystalline structure ====
Crystalline structure is the composition of ions, atoms, and molecules that are held together and ordered in a 3D shape. The main difference between a crystalline structure and an amorphous structure is the order of the components. Crystalline has the highest level of order possible in the material where amorphous structure consists of irregularities in the ordering pattern. One way to describe crystalline structures is through the crystal lattice, which is a three-dimensional representation of the location of a repeating factor (unit cell) in the structure denoted with lattices. There are 14 different configurations of atom arrangement in a crystalline structure, and are all represented under Bravais lattices.

==== Defects of crystalline structure ====
During the formation of a crystalline structure, different impurities, irregularities, and other defects can form. These imperfections can form through deformation of the solid, rapid cooling, or high energy radiation. Types of defects include point defects, line defects, as well as edge dislocation.

=== Macrostructure ===
Macrostructure refers to the overall geometric properties that will influence the force at failure, stiffness, bending, stress distribution, and the weight of the material. It requires little to no magnification to reveal the macrostructure of a material. Observing the macrostructure reveals properties such as cavities, porosity, gas bubbles, stratification, and fissures. The material's strength and elastic modulus are both independent of the macrostructure.

== Natural biomaterials ==
Biomaterials can be constructed using only materials sourced from plants and animals in order to alter, replace, or repair human tissue/organs. Use of natural biomaterials were used as early as ancient Egypt, where indigenous people used animal skin as sutures. A more modern example is a hip replacement using ivory material which was first recorded in Germany 1891.

Valuable criteria for viable natural biomaterials:

- Biodegradable
- Biocompatible
- Able to promote cell attachment and growth
- Non-toxic

Examples of natural biomaterials:

- Alginate
- Matrigel
- Fibrin
- Collagen
- Myocardial tissue engineering

=== Biopolymers ===
Biopolymers are polymers produced by living organisms. Cellulose and starch, proteins and peptides, and DNA and RNA are all examples of biopolymers, in which the monomeric units, respectively, are sugars, amino acids, and nucleotides. Cellulose is both the most common biopolymer and the most common organic compound on Earth. About 33% of all plant matter is cellulose. On a similar manner, silk (a proteinaceous biopolymer) has garnered tremendous research interest across various domains, including tissue engineering, regenerative medicine, microfluidics, and drug delivery.

== See also ==
- Bionics
- Hydrogel
- Polymeric surface
- Surface modification of biomaterials with proteins
- Synthetic biodegradable polymer
- List of biomaterials
