= Microplate =

Flat plate with multiple "wells" used as small test tubes

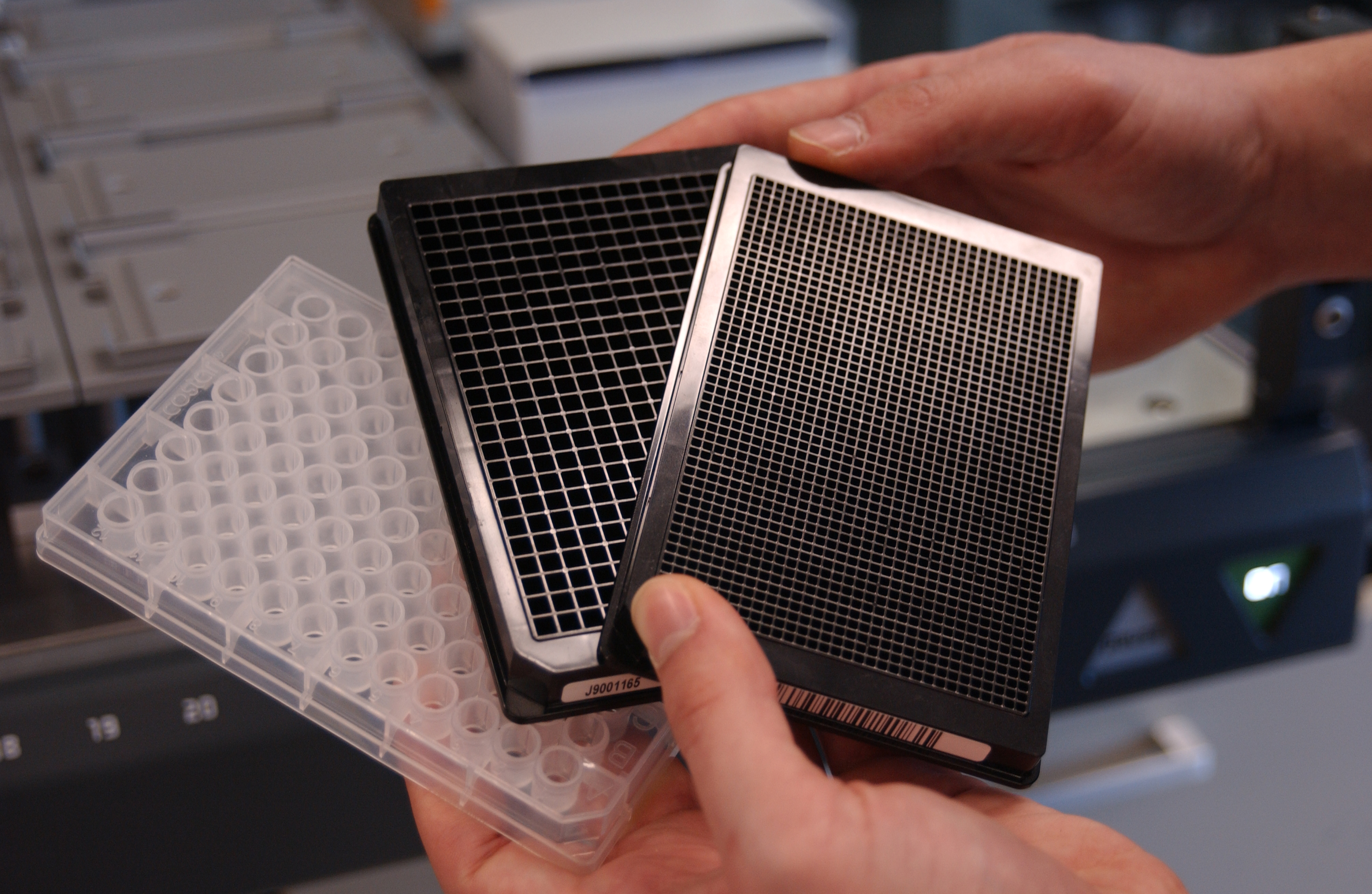
Microtiter plates with 96, 384 and 1536 wells

A microplate, also known as a microtiter plate, microwell plate or multiwell, is a flat plate with multiple "wells" used as small test tubes. The microplate has become a standard tool in analytical research and clinical diagnostic testing laboratories. A very common usage is in the enzyme-linked immunosorbent assay (ELISA), the basis of most modern medical diagnostic testing in humans and animals.

A microplate typically has 6, 12, 24, 48, 96, 384 or 1536 sample wells arranged in a 2:3 rectangular matrix. Some microplates have been manufactured with 3456 or 9600 wells, and an "array tape" product has been developed that provides a continuous strip of microplates embossed on a flexible plastic tape.

Each well of a microplate typically holds somewhere between tens of nanolitres to several millilitres of liquid. They can also be used to store dry powder or as racks to support glass tube inserts. Wells can be either circular or square. For compound storage applications, square wells with close fitting silicone cap-mats are preferred. Microplates can be stored at low temperatures for long periods, may be heated to increase the rate of solvent evaporation from their wells and can even be heat-sealed with foil or clear film. Microplates with an embedded layer of filter material were developed in the early 1980s by several companies, and today, there are microplates for just about every application in life science research which involves filtration, separation, optical detection, storage, reaction mixing, cell culture and detection of antimicrobial activity.

The enormous growth in studies of whole live cells has led to an entirely new range of microplate products which are "tissue culture treated" especially for this work. The surfaces of these products are modified using an oxygen plasma discharge to make their surfaces more hydrophilic so that it becomes easier for adherent cells to grow on the surface which would otherwise be strongly hydrophobic.

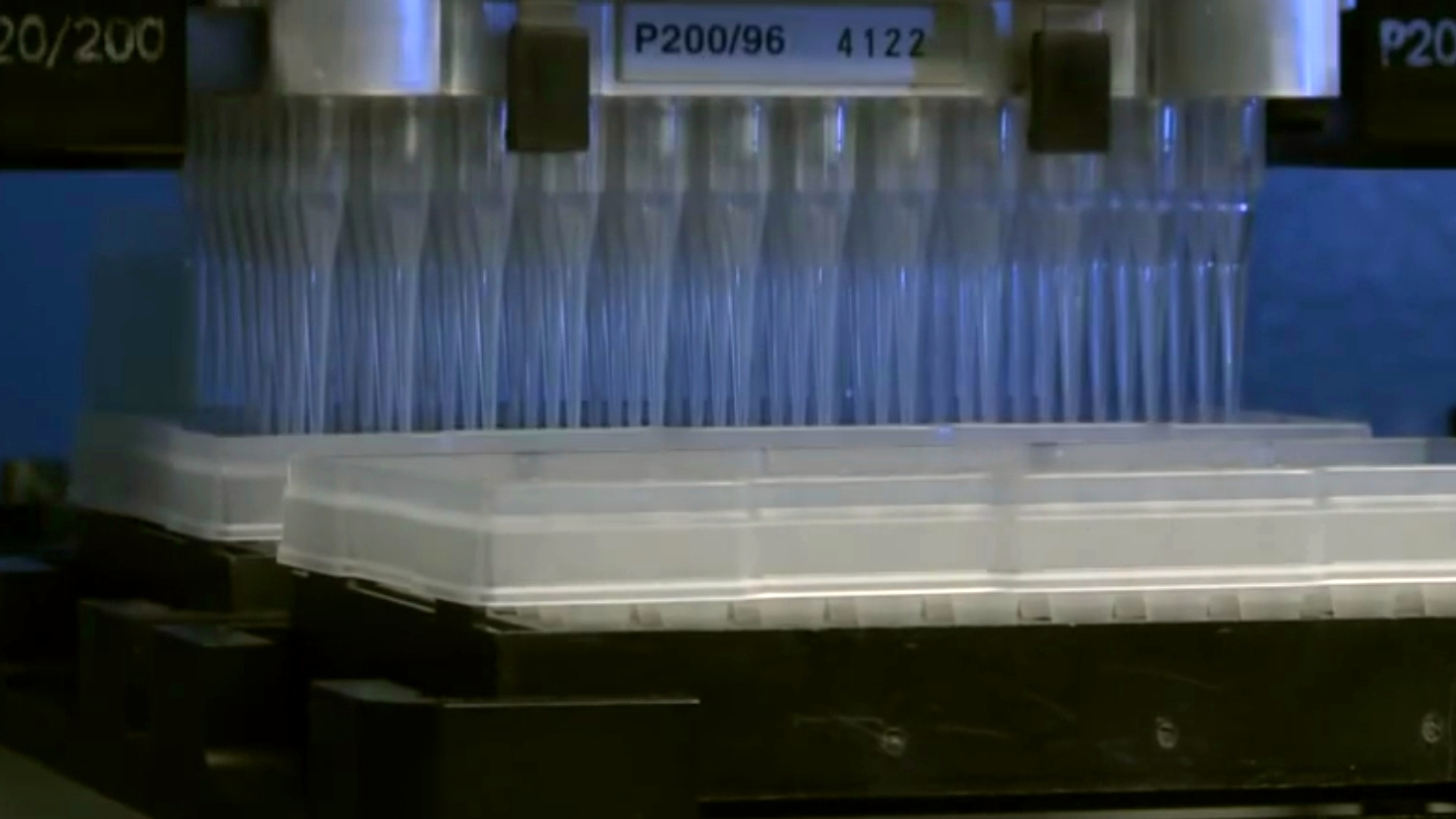
Liquid handling robot for 96 wells

A number of companies have developed robots to specifically handle microplates. These robots may be liquid handlers which aspirate or dispense liquid samples from and to these plates, or "plate movers" which transport them between instruments, plate stackers which store microplates during these processes, plate hotels for longer-term storage, plate washers for processing plates, plate thermal sealers for applying heat seals, de-sealers for removing heat seals, or microplate incubators to ensure constant temperature during testing. Instrument companies have designed plate readers which can detect specific biological, chemical or physical events in samples stored in these plates. A specialized plate reader has also been developed which can perform quality control of microplate well contents, capable of identifying empty wells, filled wells and precipitate.

== Manufacture and composition ==
The most common manufacturing process is injection molding, using materials such as polystyrene, polypropylene and cyclo-olefin for different temperature and chemical resistance needs. Glass is also a possible material, and vacuum forming can be used with many other plastics such as polycarbonate.

Microplates are manufactured from a variety of materials:

- Polystyrene (PS) is the most common, and is used for high-clarity optical detection microplates. It can be coloured white by the addition of titanium dioxide for optical absorbance or luminescence detection or black by the addition of carbon for fluorescent biological assays. But, it has poor resistance to organic solvents. It also starts melting at around 80˚C, and thus cannot be autoclaved.
- Polypropylene (PP) is used for the construction of plates subject to wide changes in temperature, such as storage at −80 °C and thermal cycling. It has excellent properties for the long-term storage of novel chemical compounds and high resistance to organic solvents. It can be sterilized by autoclaving at 121˚C. Reportedly leachables including plasticizers (i.e. phthalates), whiteners, and heavy metals (cobalt) are more of a concern with PP versus PS plates.
- Cyclo-olefins (COP and COC) are now being used to construct microplates which transmit near-ultraviolet light, allowing applications like protein assays via absorbance measurements at 280 nm. But, COC has a poor resistance to organic solvents.
- Polycarbonate (PC) is cheap and easy to mould and has been used for disposable microplates for the polymerase chain reaction (PCR) method of DNA amplification.
- Glass or quartz is also, albeit less commonly & rather expensively, used to construct microplates for special applications that require extreme resistance to organic solvents and/or the surface properties of glass, or the ultraviolet C transmission capability of quartz.

Composite microplates, including filter bottom plates, solid phase extraction (SPE) plates, and even some advanced PCR plate designs, use multiple components and/or materials which are moulded separately and later assembled into a finished product. ELISA plates may now be assembled from twelve separate strips of eight wells, making it easier to only partially use a plate.

== Formats and Standardization efforts ==
Microplates are produced with the same standardized footprint, but using a variety of formats (see table below), materials (see above section), plate heights, numbers of wells, well shapes, and well bottom heights, with some of these characteristics being more varied between manufacturers than others (see below section).

wells		volume (mL)
number	arrangement	volume (mL)
6	2×3	2 – 5
12	3×4	2 – 4
24	4×6	0.5 – 3
48	6×8	0.5 – 1.5
96	8×12	0.1 – 0.3
384	16×24	0.03 – 0.1
1536	32×48	0.005 – 0.015; Usage in UHTS (Ultra HTS)
3456	48×72	0.001 – 0.005; Usage in UHTS (Ultra HTS).

There are also less common 192- and 768-well plates.

24-well

48-well

96-well

384-well

=== Standardization efforts ===
An attempt at standardizing microplates was made by the Society for Biomolecular Sciences with the ANSI-Standards (ANSI/SBS 1-2004, ANSI/SBS 2-2004, ANSI/SBS 3-2004, ANSI/SBS 4-2004). These standards have been updated to and are now known as the ANSI SLAS standards.

==== Footprint & flange (standardized) ====
The ANSI SLAS microplate standards define a footprint, and a bottom flange geometry. These footprints & flanges are generally rigorously followed by all microplate manufacturers:

- Footprint standard (127.76 mm × 85.48 mm ± 0.5 mm)
- Flange standard

==== Corner notch ====
Although a corner notch (aka chamfer) is shown at the A1 (top-left) corner in the ANSI SLAS drawings, and many microplates do implement this A1 corner notch, in actuality the "quantity and location of chamfers(s) is optional", so in practice the presence or absence of corner notches at additional corners (i.e. the bottom-left) is a proprietary implementation which causes difficulties with accessory cross-compatibility such as with microplate lids that may also implement the matching corner notch.

==== Well position (standardized) ====
The well position is also standardized, but only for 96-, 384-, and 1536-well plates. These are generally well followed by manufacturers:

- Well Positions

96-well plates have a 9 mm well-to-well spacing, 384-wells a 4.5 mm spacing, and 1536-wells a 2.25 mm spacing. A notable characteristic is that the well array is symmetrical when the plate is rotated 180˚ around its Z-axis (height axis). Therefore, scientific instruments which use microplates, can accept the plate in one of two rotated orientations - either "correct" or 180˚ rotated.

Other variants like 24-well plates, are not considered in the standard, but there is a de facto standard to implement to 24-wells by apply the same scaling factor as the 384- to 96-well transition, i.e. 24-wells have an 18 mm spacing.

==== Well shape ====
Notably, the shape and diameter of the well is not standardized, and has several proprietary implementations. This causes difficulties with accessory cross-compatibility such as with microplate cap mats.

Wells within the microplate are available in different shapes:

- Round well
- Square well

Wells also have different geometries at the bottom of the well:

- F-Bottom: flat bottom (compatible with through-well optical plate reader measurements)
- V-Bottom: V-shaped bottom (conical for round wells, square pyramid for square wells; improves aspiration of low liquid volumes)
- U-Bottom: U-shaped bottom (half sphere; improves aspiration of low liquid volumes)
- C-Bottom: bottom with minimal rounded edges

Round wells in particular often come in a few diameters:

- 6.96 mm
- 8.3 mm

==== Well Bottom Elevation ====
The most recent addition to the ANSI SLAS microplate standards was the inclusion of a well bottom standard. The standard however specifies definitions and test methods only, for the "Microplate Well Bottom Elevation (WBE)", "Well Bottom Elevation Variation (WBEV)", and "Intra-Well Bottom Elevation Variation (IWBEV)", but it does not state a preferred value or limits for those dimensional definitions. Therefore all well bottom heights are currently proprietary implementations without a clear de facto standard. This lack of standardization can cause difficulties with applications such as automated autosampler needle injection.

- Well Bottom Elevation

==== Standard microplate height ====
The height of a standard microplate is also defined, however this is sometimes not followed by manufacturers, even if they follow the footprint and flange standards.

- Height (14.35 mm ± 0.76 mm)

==== Microplate variants with increased heights ====
There are also deep well microplates sometimes called "blocks". Unlike plates of normal height, the ANSI SLAS 2-2004 height standard, does not define a standard height for deep well plates (blocks). Deepwell plates do typically follow a de facto standard height of 44 mm.

Reservoir plates are also commercially available. Reservoir plates have columns of wells (as in 96-well, 24-well, etc. plates) that are fused into single wells, so that they provide additional volume for multichannel pipettes. Like deepwell plates or blocks, they often follow a de facto standard height of 44 mm.

==== Skirts ====
Microplates used for PCR are designed to have a notably thinner wall thickness than standard ANSI/SLAS microplates (to allow for better thermal conduction), and to come in a few different "skirt" types: full-skirt, half-skirt or semi-skirted, and unskirted or no-skirted. The skirt is analogous to the footprint & flange of the ANSI/SLAS standards, so while most full-skirt PCR microplates may be ANSI/SLAS compliant, other deviations such as semi-skirted or others, are not compliant ANSI/SLAS standards.

== History ==
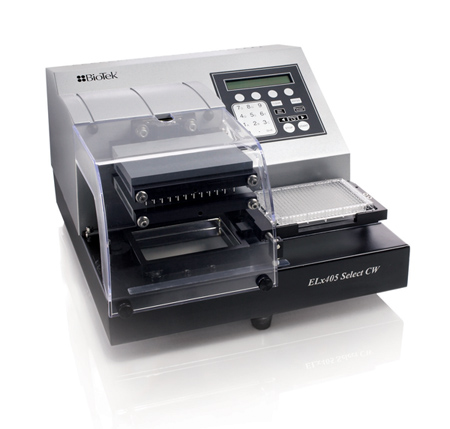
A commercial microplate washer

The earliest microplate was created in 1951 by a Hungarian, Dr. Gyula Takátsy, who machined six rows of 12 "wells" in Lucite. Subsequently, Dr. John Louis Sever modified the Hungarian design into a 96-well plate, which he published in 1962. However, common usage of the microplate began in the late 1980s when John Liner introduced a molded version. By 1990 there were more than 15 companies producing a wide range of microplates with different features. It was estimated that 125 million microplates were used in 2000 alone. The word "Microtiter" is a registered trademark of Thermo Electron OY (U.S. Trademark 754,087.)

Other trade names for microplates include Viewplate and Unifilter (introduced in the early 1990s by Polyfiltronics and sold by Packard Instrument, which is now part of PerkinElmer).

In 1996, the Society for Biomolecular Screening (SBS), later known as Society for Biomolecular Sciences, began an initiative to create a standard definition of a microplate. A series of standards was proposed in 2003 and published by the American National Standards Institute (ANSI) on behalf of the SBS. The standards govern various characteristics of a microplate including well positioning (but not shape, depth, and diameter) as well as plate properties, which allows interoperability between microplates, instrumentation and equipment from different suppliers, and is particularly important in laboratory automation. In 2010, the Society for Biomolecular Sciences merged with the Association for Laboratory Automation (ALA) to form a new organisation, the Society for Laboratory Automation and Screening (SLAS). Henceforth, the microplate standards are known as ANSI SLAS standards.

== See also ==
- Picotiter plate
- Nanotiter plate
