= Picotiter plate =

Picotiter plates are flat plates with multiple wells used as small test tubes. It is a miniaturised version of the microtiter and nanotiter plates that are standard tools in analytical research. Picotiter plates are used in the DNA sequencing strategy first exploited by a spin-off company (454 Life Sciences) and commercially available on the market. The picotiter plate platform enables parallel sequence analysis of 1.7 million of separate DNA fragments and thus is capable of sequencing entire genomes within a couple of hours. Titerplates can be produced from photosensitive glass, such as Foturan from SCHOTT Corporation.
