= Dean Ho (biomedical engineer) =

American biomedical engineer

Dean Ho is a Provost's Chair Professor in the Departments of Biomedical Engineering and Pharmacology, Director of the N.1 Institute for Health, Director of the Institute for Digital Medicine, and Head of the Department of Biomedical Engineering at the National University of Singapore. He was previously a professor at UCLA, and associate professor in the Departments of Biomedical Engineering and Mechanical Engineering in the Robert R. McCormick School of Engineering and Applied Science, and Full Member of the Robert H. Lurie Comprehensive Cancer Center at the Feinberg School of Medicine of Northwestern University, Illinois, United States.

== Longevity and Healthspan Human Trial ==
Ho launched DELTA, a N=1 trial where Ho is the test subject. Approved by an institutional review board (IRB), DELTA is a prospective, interventional study that is exploring the use of digital health to optimise metabolic performance, sleep, gut health, and other aspects of healthspan. Early results from this study were published in a peer-reviewed article in PNAS Nexus.. Ho has spoken at international longevity, AI, and healthspan conferences on the DELTA trial and the impact of N=1 Health on population healthspan optimization.

== Career ==
Ho's research has covered emerging areas of nanomedicine and nanodiamond-based drug delivery. Ho and his colleagues were the first to develop nanodiamond platforms for cancer therapy and wound healing, among other areas. Ho and colleagues were the first to demonstrate the translational potential of nanodiamonds as chemotherapeutic delivery agents, specifically towards the treatment of drug-resistant cancers in vivo. This work was published as the Cover Article of the March 9 issue of the journal Science Translational Medicine. Ho is also leading 2 clinical trials to validate nanodiamond-embedded biomaterial devices for wound healing and the prevention of re-infection. He has also developed nanodiamond-functionalized biomaterials for other clinically relevant applications.

Ho is also known for his work in the areas of artificial intelligence (AI) and its application towards personalized and precision medicine. His team and colleagues pioneered the field of Augmented AI (CURATE.AI), which mediates model-free and mechanism-independent N-of-1 combination therapy and rapidly accelerated and globally optimized drug development. This has led to multiple clinical trials that have validated the CURATE.AI platform. This AI platform has realized best-in-class medicines for population-wide administration, as well as the unprecedented ability to actionably personalize treatment for the entire duration of care on a patient-specific basis. Ho's extensive research achievements have garnered news coverage in The Economist, Forbes, Nature, CNN, NPR, as well as The Washington Post. He was also featured in the National Geographic Channel program, Known Universe. Most recently, the Augmented AI platform was featured by FuturizeX, a partnership between the X PRIZE Foundation and UCLA. Recent clinical advances using this AI approach to enhance clinical outcomes were recognized among the finalists for the SLAS Innovation Award, selection among the SLAS Technology 10, and featured at the PM3 panel at InnovFest Unbound.

Ho currently serves as the Director of The N.1 Institute for Health (N.1), which was previously known as SINAPSE, as well as Director of the Institute for Digital Medicine (WisDM) at the Yong Loo Lin School of Medicine, National University of Singapore. N.1 and WisDM are clinical stage research institutes that harnesses AI and Digital Medicine for novel clinical trial designs for interventional studies. Over ten first-in-human clinical studies based on N.1 and WisDM-developed technologies are ongoing or nearing clearance for the start of prospective clinical studies. N.1 and WisDM have pioneered the development and subsequent clinical translation of platforms pertaining to N-of-1 medicine, digital therapeutics, COVID-19 therapeutic regimen optimization, pain management, cognitive neuroengineering, and novel drug development, among many others.

Ho is an elected member of the US National Academy of Inventors (NAI). He is also a Fellow of the American Association for the Advancement of Science (AAAS), American Institute for Medical and Biological Engineering (AIMBE), Royal Society of Chemistry (RSC), and the Society for Laboratory Automation and Screening (SLAS). He was also named to the HIMSS Future50 Class of 2021 for his internationally recognized leadership in digital health, and the 2016 Power List of The Pathologist Magazine. Previously, Ho served the Editor-in-Chief of the Journal of Laboratory Automation, now known as SLAS Technology. He also served as the President of the Board of Directors of the Society for Laboratory Automation and Screening which is a 20,000+ member drug development and life sciences technology organization. Ho is a recipient of the National Science Foundation CAREER Award, Wallace H. Coulter Foundation Translational Research Award, V Foundation for Cancer Research V Scholar Award, John G. Bollinger Outstanding Young Manufacturing Engineering Award of the Society of Manufacturing Engineers, UCLA School of Engineering and Applied Science Distinguished Young Alumnus Award, IADR William J. Gies Award, and IADR Young Investigator Award.

== See also ==
- Robert R. McCormick School of Engineering and Applied Science
- Northwestern University
- Dance Marathon at UCLA
- Pi Kappa Phi
