= ADMET =

ADMET may refer to:

- ADME-Tox, absorption, distribution, metabolism, and excretion–toxicity in pharmacokinetics
- Acyclic diene metathesis, an olefin metathesis polymerisation method
