= Society for Biomolecular Sciences =

The Society for Biomolecular Sciences (SBS) was an international learned society, originally established as the Society for Biomolecular Screening in 1994, for scientists and technologists in academia, government and industry, headquartered in Danbury, CT, US. Its focus was education and information exchange among professionals in the chemical, pharmaceutical, biotech, and agrochemical industries in the field of drug discovery and technologies. It was the publisher of the peer-reviewed scientific journal, Journal of Biomolecular Screening. In 2010, it merged with the Association for Laboratory Automation to form the Society for Laboratory Automation and Screening.

SBS has created, in collaboration with ANSI, dimensional standards for microplates used in screening. Originally, recognized as the ANSI/SBS standard, it is now as the ANSI/SLAS standard.
