= Foturan =

Brand of glass

Foturan demonstrator in different processing steps (UV-exposure, tempering, etching, ceramization)

Foturan (notation of the manufacturer: FOTURAN) is a photosensitive glass by SCHOTT Corporation developed in 1984. It is a technical glass-ceramic which can be structured without photoresist when it is exposed to shortwave radiation such as ultraviolet light and subsequently etched.

In February 2016, Schott announced the introduction of Foturan II at Photonics West. Foturan II is characterized by higher homogeneity of the photosensitivity which allows finer microstructures.

== Composition and Properties ==
Composition
| Ingredient | SiO_{2} | LiO_{2} | Al_{2}O_{3} | K_{2}O | Na_{2}O | ZnO | B_{2}O_{3} | Sb_{2}O_{3} | Ag_{2}O | CeO_{2} |
| Proportions (%) | 75–85 | 7–11 | 3–6 | 3–6 | 1–2 | 0–2 | 0–1 | 0.2-1 | 0.1-0.3 | 0.01-0.2 |
Mechanical Properties
| Knoop Hardness in N/mm^{2} (0.1/20) | | | | | | | | | | 480 |
| Vickers-Härte in N/mm^{2} (0.2/25) | | | | | | | | | | 520 |
| Density in g/cm^{3} | | | | | | | | | | 2.37 |
Thermal Properties
| Coefficient of mean linear thermal expansion a_{20-300} in 10^{−6}·K^{−1} | | | | | | | | | | 8.49 |
| Thermal Conductivity at 90 °C in W/mK | | | | | | | | | | 1.28 |
| Transformation Temperature T_{g} in °C | | | | | | | | | | 455 |
Electrical Properties at different frequencies
| Frequency (GHz) | | | | | | | | 1.1 | 1.9 | 5 |
Relative Permittivity
| Glass-state (annealed at 40 °C/h) | | | | | | | | 6.4 | 6.4 | 6.4 |
| Ceramic-state (ceramized at 560 °C) | | | | | | | | 5.8 | 5.9 | 5.8 |
| Ceramic-state (ceramized at 810 °C) | | | | | | | | 5.4 | 5.5 | 5.4 |
Dissipation factor tanα(·10^{−4})
| Glass-state (annealed at 40 °C/h) | | | | | | | | 84 | 90 | 109 |
| Ceramic-state (ceramized at 560 °C) | | | | | | | | 58 | 65 | 79 |
| Ceramic-state (ceramized at 810 °C) | | | | | | | | 39 | 44 | 55 |
Chemical Properties
| Hydrolytic resistance acc. to DIN ISO 719 in μgNa_{2}O/g (class) | | | | | | | | | 578 (HGB 4) | |
| Acid resistance acc. to DIN 12116 in mg/dm^{2} (class) | | | | | | | | | 0.48 (S1) | |
| Alkali resistance acc. to DIN ISO 695 in mg/dm^{2} (class) | | | | | | | | | 100 (A2) | |
Optical properties
Refractive Index
| Wavelength (nm), λ= | | | | | | 300 | 486.1 (n_{F}) | 546.1 (n_{e}) | 567.6 (n_{d}) | 656.3 (n_{C}) |
| Glass-state (annealed at 40 °C/h) | | | | | | 1.549 | 1.518 | 1.515 | 1.512 | 1.510 |
| Ceramic-state (ceramized at 560 °C) | | | | | | n/a | 1.519 | 1.515 | 1.513 | 1.511 |
| Ceramic-state (ceramized at 810 °C) | | | | | | n/a | 1.532 | 1.528 | 1.526 | 1.523 |
Spectral Transmittance
| τ(λ) | | | | | | t_{250} | t_{270} | t_{280} | t_{295} | t_{350} |
| in (%, 1mm) | | | | | | 0.1 | 3 | 11 | 29 | 89 |

Foturan is a lithium aluminosilicate glass system doped with small amounts of silver oxides and cerium oxides.

== Processing ==
Foturan can be structured via UV-exposure, tempering and etching: Crystal nucleation grow in Foturan when exposed to UV and heat treated afterwards. The crystalized areas react much faster to hydrofluoric acid than the surrounding vitreous material, resulting in very fine microstructures, tight tolerance and high aspect ratio.

=== Exposure ===
If Foturan is exposed to light in the ultra-violet-range with a wavelength of 320 nm (eventually via photomask, contact lithography or proximity lithography to expose certain patterns), a chemical reaction is started in the exposed areas: The containing Ce^{3+} transforms into Ce^{4+} and frees an electron.

$$\mathrm{Ce^{3+} + h\nu(312\ \mathrm{nm}) \longrightarrow Ce^{4+} + e^- }$$

=== Tempering ===
During the nucleation tempering (~ 500 °C), the Silver-ion Ag^{+} will be transferred into Ag^{0} by scavenging the electron released from Ce^{3+}.

$$\mathrm{Ag^{+} + e^- + \Delta H \longrightarrow Ag^{0} }$$

This activates the agglomeration of atomic silver to form nanometer-scale silver clusters

$$\mathrm{xAg^{0} + \Delta H \longrightarrow (Ag^{0})x }$$

During the subsequent crystallization tempering (~560-600 °C), lithium metasilicates (Li_{2}SiO_{3} glass-ceramic) forms on the silver cluster nucleation in the exposed areas. The unexposed glass, otherwise amorphous, remains unchanged.

=== Etching ===
After tempering, the crystallized areas can be etched with hydrofluoric acid 20 times faster than the unexposed, still amorphous glass. Thus, structures with an aspect ratio of ca. 10:1 can be created.

=== Ceramization (Optional) ===
After etching, a ceramization of the entire substrate after a 2nd UV-exposure and thermal treatment is possible. The crystalline phase in this stage is lithium disilicate Li_{2}Si_{2}O_{5}.

== Product characteristics ==
- Small structure size: Structure sizes of ~ 25 μm are possible
- High aspect ratio: Etchingratios of > 20:1 make aspect ratio of > 10:1 and a wall angle of ~ 1-2° possible
- High optical transmission in visible and non-visible spectrum: More than 90% transmission (substrate thickness 1 mm) between 350 nm and 2.700 nm
- High temperature resistance: Tg > 450°Celsius
- Pore-free: Suitable for biotech / microfluidics application
- Low self fluorescence
- Hydrolytic resistance (acc. to DIN ISO 719): HGB 4
- Acid resistance (acc. to DIN 12116): S 1
- Alkali resistance (acc. to DIN ISO 695): A 2

== Foturan in the scientific community ==
Foturan is a widely known material in the material science community. As of October 30, 2015, Google Scholar showed more than 1.000 results of Foturan in scholarly literatures across an array of publishing formats and disciplines.

Many of those deal with topics such as

- Micromachining Foturan
- 3D / laser direct writing in Foturan
- Using Foturan for optical waveguides
- Using Foturan for volume gratings
- Processing Foturan via excimer / femtosecond laser

== Applications ==
Foturan is mainly used for microstructure applications, where small and complex structures have to be created out of a solid and robust base material. Overall there are five main areas for which Foturan is used:

- Microfluidics / Biotech (such as lab-on-a-chip or organ-on-a-chip components, micro mixer, micro reactor, printheads, titer plates, chip electrophoresis)
- Semiconductor (such FED spacer, packaging elements or interposer for IC components, CMOS or memory modules)
- Sensors (such as flow- or temperature sensors, gyroscopes or accelerometers)
- RF / MEMS (such as substrates or packaging elements for antennas, capacitors, filter, duplexers, switches or oscillators)
- Telecom (such as optical alignment chips, optical waveguides or optical interconnects)

By thermal diffusion bonding it is possible to bond multiple Foturan layers on top of each other to create complex 3-dimensional microstructures.
