= SLAS Discovery =

- Discipline: Life Sciences Research
- Language: English
- Edited by: Robert M. Campbell

Publication details
- History: 1996-present
- Publisher: Elsevier Publications on behalf of the Society for Laboratory Automation and Screening
- Frequency: 10/year
- Impact factor: 2.918 (2020)

Standard abbreviations
- ISO 4: SLAS Discov.

Indexing
- CODEN: JBISF3
- ISSN: 2472-5552 (print); 2472-5560 (web)
- LCCN: 2016200551
- OCLC no.: 949879597

Links
- Journal homepage; Online access and archive

SLAS Discovery (Advancing the Science of Drug Discovery) is a peer-reviewed scientific journal published by the Society for Laboratory Automation and Screening (SLAS) in partnership with SAGE Publications. The editor-in-chief is Robert M. Campbell, Ph.D. (Eli Lilly and Company). The journal explores how scientists develop and utilize novel technologies and/or approaches to provide and characterize chemical and biological tools to understand and treat human disease. This includes scientific and technical advances in target identification/validation; biomarker discovery; assay development; virtual, medium- or high-throughput screening; lead generation/optimization; chemical biology; and informatics. The journal was published from 1996 through 2016 with the title Journal of Biomolecular Screening. Its name changed in 2017 to more accurately reflect the evolution of its editorial scope.^{[1]}

== Abstracting and indexing ==
SLAS Discovery is abstracted and indexed in:

- Elsevier BIOBASE
- Biomolecular Interaction Network Database
- Biotechnology Citation Index
- Chemical Abstracts
- Current Contents/Life Sciences
- EMBASE
- EMBiology
- Index Medicus
- MEDLINE
- Science Citation Index Expanded
- Scopus

According to the Journal Citation Reports, the journal's 2016 impact factor is 2.444, ranking it 31 out of 76 journals in the "Chemistry, Analytical" category,^{[2]} 67 out of 158 journals in the "Biotechnology & Applied Microbiology" category;^{[3]} and 39 out of 77 journals in the "Biochemical Research Methods" category.^{[4]}
