= Association for Laboratory Automation =

Scientific association

The Association for Laboratory Automation (ALA) was a scientific association, organized as a nonprofit 501(c)(3), for the medical, chemical and biological laboratory automation industry. It was the publisher of the peer-reviewed scientific journal, Journal of Laboratory Automation. In 2010, it merged with the Society for Biomolecular Sciences to form the Society for Laboratory Automation and Screening.

The ALA's mission was to advance science and education related to laboratory automation by encouraging the study, advancing the science, and improving the practice of medical and laboratory automation. Its focus is on the benefits and utilization of automation, robotics, and artificial intelligence in order to improve the quality, efficiency, and relevance of laboratory analysis.
