= Gyula Takátsy =

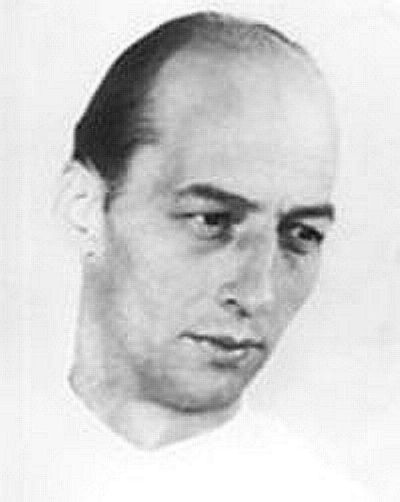
Gyula Takátsy

Gyula Takátsy (1914–1980), was a Hungarian medical doctor, microbiologist and inventor.

In 1938 he graduated from the University of Medicine in Pécs, Hungary, and joined the staff at the Institute of Public Health, where he worked until his early death in 1980.

In 1948, Takátsy and colleagues were eager to resume their influenza research that had been suspended during World War II. Unfortunately, when Hungary left the World Health Organization, the Hungarian researchers were unable to receive funding that had been promised from the World Influenza Centre in London. This led to a shortage of laboratory equipment like pipettes and test tubes, driving Takátsy to invent a number of new laboratory techniques and tools. These included small platinum spiral loops to replace pipettes, and microwell plates instead of test tubes. He introduced the idea of using calibrated spiral loops for multiple serial dilution in plastic microwell plates, and coined the term 'micromethods', first published in Hungarian in 1952 and in English in 1955, for laboratory procedures carried out on a small scale. This allowed for the use of very small volumes of blood in virus research, and a considerable reduction in the use of costly serums and antigens. Improved versions of his microwell plates are now a standard laboratory tool.

The original spiral loop was similar to the platinum loop used in bacteriology. Takátsy improved this by forming multiple windings in the loop, somewhat like the filament of an incandescent light bulb. The narrow gaps between the windings drew a constant volume of fluid by capillary action. These were calibrated and arranged in arrays, enabling efficient dilution procedures. The reliability of this microtechnique led to its adoption as the standard method for serological testing at the Communicable Disease Center.

Takátsy carried out research on the variability of antigenic structure and the pathology and epidemiology of influenza virus mutations, as well as vaccine production and control, published across 50 papers.

He was head of the Influenza Unit (WHO National Influenza Centre) which produced 630,000 vaccine doses during the Hong Kong flu pandemic of 1968/1969, was a member of the Board of the Hungarian Society of Microbiology, and received several awards, including the Manninger Rezső Medal.
