= Cyclic olefin copolymer =

Names
- Other names COC, cyclo olefin copolymer, ethylene-norbornene copolymer

Identifiers
CAS Number	26007-43-2
3D model (JSmol)	Interactive image
ChemSpider	147357
PubChem CID	168460
CompTox Dashboard (EPA)	DTXSID901011077
- InChI: InChI=1S/C7H10.C2H4/c1-2-7-4-3-6(1)5-7;1-2/h1-2,6-7H,3-5H2;1-2H2 Key: SFFFIHNOEGSAIH-UHFFFAOYSA-N; InChI=1/C7H10.C2H4/c1-2-7-4-3-6(1)5-7;1-2/h1-2,6-7H,3-5H2;1-2H2 Key: SFFFIHNOEGSAIH-UHFFFAOYAJ
- SMILES: C=C.C\1=C\C2CC/1CC2

Properties
Appearance	Clear resin
Density	1.02 g/cm^{3}, solid

Hazards
Safety data sheet (SDS)	COC US MSDS
- Except where otherwise noted, data are given for materials in their standard state (at 25 °C [77 °F], 100 kPa). verify (what is ?) Infobox references

Cyclic olefin copolymer (COC) is an amorphous polymer made by several polymer manufacturers. COC is a relatively new class of polymers as compared to commodities such as polypropylene and polyethylene. This newer material is used in a wide variety of applications including packaging films, lenses, vials, displays, and medical devices.

== Various types ==
In 2005 there were "several types of commercial cyclic olefin copolymers based on different types of cyclic monomers and polymerization methods. Cyclic olefin copolymers are produced by chain copolymerization of cyclic monomers such as 8,9,10-trinorborn-2-ene (norbornene) or 1,2,3,4,4a,5,8,8a-octahydro-1,4:5,8-dimethanonaphthalene (tetracyclododecene) with ethene (such as Polyplastics subsidiary TOPAS Advanced Polymers' TOPAS, Mitsui Chemical's APEL), or by ring-opening metathesis polymerization of various cyclic monomers followed by hydrogenation (Japan Synthetic Rubber's ARTON, Zeon Chemical's Zeonex and Zeonor)." These later materials using a single type of monomer are more properly named cyclic olefin polymers (COP).

== Chemical and physical properties ==
Typical COC material has a higher modulus than HDPE and PP, similar to PET or PC. COC also has a high moisture barrier for a clear polymer along with a low moisture absorption rate. In medical and analytical applications, COC is noted to be a high purity product with low extractables. COC is also a halogen-free and BPA-free product. Some grades of COC have shown a lack of estrogenic activity.

The optical properties of COC are exceptional, and in many ways very similar to glass. COC materials offer exceptional transparency, low birefringence, high Abbe number and high heat resistance. The moisture insensitivity of COC is often an advantage over competing materials such as polycarbonate and acrylics. The high flow of COC enables higher aspect ratio (squatter and shallower) optical component fabrication than other optical polymers. High ultraviolet transmission is a hallmark of COC materials, with optimized grades the leading polymer alternatives to quartz glass in analytical and diagnostic applications.

Some properties vary due to monomer content. These include glass transition temperature, viscosity, and stiffness. The glass transition temperature of these polymers can exceed 200°C. COC resins are commonly supplied in pellet form and are suited to standard polymer processing techniques such as single and twin screw extrusion, injection molding, injection blow molding and stretch blow molding (ISBM), compression molding, extrusion coating, biaxial orientation, thermoforming and many others. COC is noted for high dimensional stability with little change seen after processing.

COC and COP are generally attacked by non-polar solvents, such as toluene. COC shows good chemical resistance and barrier to other solvents, such as alcohols, and is very resistant to attack from acids and bases.

Electronic properties of COC are in some respects similar to fluoropolymers, most notably a similarly low dissipation factor or tan delta, and low permittivity. It is a very good insulator.

== Applications ==
=== Packaging ===
COC is commonly extruded with cast or blown film equipment in the manufacture of packaging films. Most often, due to cost, COC is used as a modifier in monolayer or multilayer film to provide properties not delivered by base resins such as polyethylene. Grades of COC based on ethylene show a certain amount of compatibility with polyethylene and can be blended with PE via commercial dry blending equipment. These films are then used in consumer applications including food and healthcare packaging. Key COC enhancements can include thermoformability, shrink, deadfold, easy tear, enhanced stiffness, heat resistance and higher moisture barrier. Common applications include shrink films and labels, twist films, protective or bubble packaging, and forming films. Another noted application which often relies on a high percentage of COC in the end product is pharmaceutical blister packaging.

=== Healthcare ===
The high purity, moisture barrier, clarity, and sterilization compatibility of COC resins make them an excellent alternative to glass in a wide range of medical products. Breakage prevention and weight reduction are common reasons for choosing COC in these applications. COC has a very low-energy and nonreactive surface, which can extend shelf life and purity of medications such as insulin and other protein drugs in applications such as vials, syringes and cartridges. The high UV transmission of COC also drives diagnostic applications such as cuvettes and microplates. COC plays an increasingly important role in microfluidics due to its chemical resistance, clarity and unusually high mold detail replication which makes it possible to reliably mold micron-scale features. Most COC grades can undergo sterilization by gamma radiation, steam, or ethylene oxide.

=== Optics ===
These polymers are commercially used in optical films, lenses, touch screens, light guide panels, reflection films, and other components for mobile devices, displays, cameras, copiers and other optical assemblies.

=== Fiber spinning ===
COC has unique electrical properties that resist dielectric breakdown and have a very low dielectric loss over time. Because of this COC is used in filter media that require a charge retention to work properly.

=== Electronics ===
The low dielectric constant of COC, even at high frequency, has led to its use in certain antenna applications as well as capacitors requiring higher temperature resistance than polypropylene can provide.

== See also ==
- Ethylene
- Polynorbornene
- EPDM rubber
