= SLAS Technology =

- Discipline: Life Sciences Research
- Language: English
- Edited by: Edward Kai-Hua Chow

Publication details
- History: 1996-present
- Publisher: Society for Laboratory Automation and Screening in partnership with Elsevier
- Frequency: Bimonthly
- Impact factor: 2.813 (2021)

Standard abbreviations
- ISO 4: SLAS Technol.

Indexing
- ISSN: 2472-6303 (print); 2472-6311 (web)
- LCCN: 2016200576
- OCLC no.: 950397180

Links
- Journal homepage; Online access and archive

SLAS Technology (Translating Life Sciences Innovation) is a peer-reviewed scientific journal published by the Society for Laboratory Automation and Screening in partnership with Elsevier . The editor-in-chief is Edward Kai-Hua Chow, Ph.D. (National University of Singapore). The journal explores ways in which scientists adapt advancements in technology for scientific exploration and experimentation, especially in life sciences research and development. This includes drug-delivery; diagnostics; biomedical and molecular imaging; personalized and precision medicine; high-throughput and other laboratory automation technologies; micro/nanotechnologies; analytical, separation and quantitative techniques; synthetic chemistry and biology; informatics (data analysis, statistics, bio, genomic and chemoinformatics); and more. The journal was published from 1996 through 2016 with the title Journal of Laboratory Automation. Its name changed in 2017 to more accurately reflect the evolution of its editorial scope.^{[1]}

== Abstracting and indexing ==
SLAS Technology is abstracted and indexed in:

- BIOSIS Previews
- Biomolecular Interaction Network Database
- Biotechnology Citation Index
- Chemical Abstracts
- Current Contents/Life Sciences
- EMBASE
- EMBiology
- Index Medicus
- Inspec
- MEDLINE
- Science Citation Index Expanded
- Scirus
- Scopus

According to the Journal Citation Reports, the journal's 2016 impact factor is 2.850, ranking it 9 out of 30 journals in the "Medical Laboratory Technology" category;^{[2]} 22 out of 76 journals in the "Chemistry, Analytical" category,^{[3]} and 30 out of 77 journals in the "Biochemical Research Methods" category.^{[4]}
