= Subatomic scale =

Domain of physical sizes which are smaller than atoms

The subatomic scale is the domain of physical size that encompasses objects smaller than an atom. It is the scale at which the atomic constituents, such as the nucleus containing protons and neutrons, and the electrons in their orbitals, become apparent.

The subatomic scale includes the many thousands of times smaller subnuclear scale, which is the scale of physical size at which constituents of the protons and neutrons—particularly quarks—become apparent. Basically, "Quantum mechanics provides the foundation for understanding matter and its behavior at the subatomic (absolutely small) level." In other words, "Quantum mechanics is a fundamental theory in physics that provides a description of the physical properties of nature at the scale of atoms and subatomic particles."

Broadly this may be conveniently divided into:

- Fundamental elementary particles as small as 1×10^{−19} m, quanta that have not yet been further divided.
- Nuclear or femtometer 1×10^{−15} m scale related to subatomic particles
- Planck scale, at 1×10^{−35} m.

It is not possible to measure exactly everything that is going on at the subatomic scale.

== See also ==
- Astronomical scale the opposite end of the spectrum
- Subatomic particle
