= Ring-opening metathesis polymerization =

Type of chain-growth polymerisation reaction involving cyclic olefins

In polymer chemistry, ring-opening metathesis polymerization (ROMP) is a type of chain-growth polymerization involving olefin metathesis. The reaction is driven by relieving ring strain in cyclic olefins. A variety of heterogeneous and homogeneous catalysts have been developed for different polymers and mechanisms. Heterogeneous catalysts are typical in large-scale commercial processes, while homogeneous catalysts are used in finer laboratory chemical syntheses. Organometallic catalysts used in ROMP usually have transition metal centres, such as tungsten, ruthenium, titanium, etc., with organic ligands.

== Heterogeneous catalysis ==
ROMP reaction giving polynorbornene. Like most commercial alkene metathesis processes, this reaction does not employ a well-defined molecular catalyst.

Heterogeneous catalysis consists of catalysts and substrates in different physical states. The catalyst is typically in solid phase. The mechanism of heterogeneous ring-opening metathesis polymerization is still under investigation.

Ring-opening metathesis polymerization of cyclic olefins has been commercialized since the 1970s. Examples of polymers produced on an industrial level through ROMP catalysis are Vestenamer, Norsorex and ZEONEX, among others.

== Mechanism ==
The mechanism of homogeneous ring-opening metathesis polymerization is well-studied. It is similar to any olefin metathesis reaction. Initiation occurs by forming an open coordination site on the catalyst. Propagation happens via a metallacycle intermediate formed after a 2+2 cycloaddition. When using a G3 catalyst, 2+2 cycloaddition is the rate determining step.

=== Frontal ring-opening metathesis polymerization ===
Frontal ring-opening metathesis polymerization (FROMP) is a variation of ROMP. It is a polymerization system that reacts via a cascading reaction front after application of a trigger to kick off the reaction in a localized zone. One example of this system is the FROMP of dicyclopentadiene with a Grubbs' catalyst initiated by heat.

== See also ==
- Acyclic diene metathesis
- Ring-opening polymerization
