= Acyclic diene metathesis =

Acyclic diene metathesis or 'ADMET' (distinguish from ADME) is a special type of olefin metathesis used to polymerize terminal dienes to polyenes:

ADMET

The new double bonds formed can be in cis- or trans-configurations. The exact ratio depends on the identities of the monomer and catalyst.

ADMET is a type of step-growth, condensation polymerization. It should be distinguished from ring-opening metathesis polymerization (ROMP), which is a chain-growth, addition polymerization. Whereas ADMET is driven by the release of volatile ethylene gas, ROMP is driven by the relief of ring-strain.

While the concept of ADMET had been discussed in the scientific literature since the 1970s, the first successful ADMET polymerization was reported in 1991. In this report, 1,5-hexadiene and 1,9-decadiene were polymerized to 1,4-polybutadiene and poly(octenylene), respectively. The polybutadiene had a weight average molar mass (M_{w}) of 28,000 with over 70% trans double bonds. The poly(octenylene) had an M_{w} of 108,000 with over 90% trans double bonds.

ADMET has been applied in the synthesis of a variety of polymers. Because of the higher degree of control in ADMET than in traditional radical polymerizations, it has been used to synthesize model polymers that would otherwise be difficult to prepare. Examples include purely linear polyethylene, alternating and block copolymers of ethylene with various other vinyl monomers, chiral polymers and polymers with embedded amino acids. The high functional group tolerance of ruthenium-catalyzed ADMET has been applied in the synthesis of new supramolecular structures.
