= Synthetic biodegradable polymer =

Many opportunities exist for the application of synthetic biodegradable polymers in the biomedical area particularly in the fields of tissue engineering and controlled drug delivery. Degradation is important in biomedicine for many reasons. Degradation of the polymeric implant means surgical intervention may not be required in order to remove the implant at the end of its functional life, eliminating the need for a second surgery. In tissue engineering, biodegradable polymers can be designed such to approximate tissues, providing a polymer scaffold that can withstand mechanical stresses, provide a suitable surface for cell attachment and growth, and degrade at a rate that allows the load to be transferred to the new tissue. In the field of controlled drug delivery, biodegradable polymers offer tremendous potential either as a drug delivery system alone or in conjunction to functioning as a medical device.

In the development of applications of biodegradable polymers, the chemistry of some polymers including synthesis and degradation is reviewed below. A description of how properties can be controlled by proper synthetic controls such as copolymer composition, special requirements for processing and handling, and some of the commercial devices based on these materials are discussed.

== Polymer chemistry and material selection ==
When investigating the selection of the polymer for biomedical applications, important criteria to consider are;

- The mechanical properties must match the application and remain sufficiently strong until the surrounding tissue has healed.
- The degradation time must match the time required.
- It does not invoke a toxic response.
- It is metabolized in the body after fulfilling its purpose.
- It is easily processable in the final product form with an acceptable shelf life and easily sterilized.

Mechanical performance of a biodegradable polymer depends on various factors which include monomer selection, initiator selection, process conditions and the presence of additives. These factors influence the polymers crystallinity, melt and glass transition temperatures and molecular weight. Each of these factors needs to be assessed on how they affect the biodegradation of the polymer. Biodegradation can be accomplished by synthesizing polymers with hydrolytically unstable linkages in the backbone. This is commonly achieved by the use of chemical functional groups such as esters, anhydrides, orthoesters and amides. Most biodegradable polymers are synthesized by ring opening polymerization.

== Processing ==
Biodegradable polymers can be melt processed by conventional means such as compression or injection molding. Special consideration must be given to the need to exclude moisture from the material. Care must be taken to dry the polymers before processing to exclude humidity. As most biodegradable polymers have been synthesized by ring opening polymerization, a thermodynamic equilibrium exists between the forward polymerization reaction and the reverse reaction that results in monomer formation. Care needs to be taken to avoid an excessively high processing temperature that may result in monomer formation during the molding and extrusion process. It must be followed carefully. Resorbable polymers can also be 3D printed.

== Degradation ==
Once implanted, a biodegradable device should maintain its mechanical properties until it is no longer needed and then be absorbed by the body leaving no trace. The backbone of the polymer is hydrolytically unstable. That is, the polymer is unstable in a water based environment. This is the prevailing mechanism for the polymers degradation. This occurs in two stages.

1. Water penetrates the bulk of the device, attacking the chemical bonds in the amorphous phase and converting long polymer chains into shorter water-soluble fragments. This causes a reduction in molecular weight without the loss of physical properties as the polymer is still held together by the crystalline regions. Water penetrates the device leading to metabolization of the fragments and bulk erosion.

2. Surface erosion of the polymer occurs when the rate at which the water penetrating the device is slower than the rate of conversion of the polymer into water-soluble materials.

Biomedical engineers can tailor a polymer to slowly degrade and transfer stress at the appropriate rate to surrounding tissues as they heal by balancing the chemical stability of the polymer backbone, the geometry of the device, and the presence of catalysts, additives or plasticisers.

== Applications ==
Biodegradable polymers are used commercially in both the tissue engineering and drug delivery field of biomedicine. Specific applications include.

- Sutures
- Dental devices (PLGA)
- Orthopedic fixation devices
- Tissue engineering scaffolds
- Biodegradable vascular stents
- Biodegradable soft tissue anchors
