= Nanotiter =

A nanotiter plate is a flat plate with multiple wells used as small test tubes. It is a miniaturised version of the microtiter plates that are standard tools in analytical research.

== Information ==
Due to the extremely low amounts of liquids 0.1 - 10 nl and reagents, the methods to work with nanoliterplates are completely different compared to the methods used for microliter plates. Nanoliter plates reduce the amount of reagents, require lower sample volumes and increase the numbers of tests that can be performed in the lab.

Examples how nanoliterplates are handled are described in literature. (see e.g.: Dietrich, H. R. C. et al. Analytical Chemistry 2004, 76, 4112-17 or Guijt-van Duijn, R. A. et al. Biotechnology Advances 2003, 21, 431-44.).
