= Society for Laboratory Automation and Screening =

- Abbreviation: SLAS
- Formation: 2010
- Headquarters: Oak Brook, Illinois, United States
- CEO: Vicki Loise
- Website: www.slas.org

Society for Laboratory Automation and Screening (SLAS) is a scientific and professional society formed in 2010 as a merger between the Association for Laboratory Automation and the Society for Biomolecular Sciences. The mission of SLAS is "to bring together researchers in academia, industry and government to advance life sciences discovery and technology via education, knowledge exchange and global community building."

SLAS has its global office near Chicago, as well as offices in Brussels. Since 2014, its annual meetings are held alternately in San Diego, California in even-numbered years, and in Washington, D.C., in odd-numbered years. For 2021, the SLAS International conference will be held in a virtual format, online. Starting in 2022, the East coast location for the conference will be held in Boston, MA.

== Purpose ==
SLAS is organized and operated exclusively for charitable, educational, and scientific purposes as defined by Internal Revenue Code Section ("IRC") 501(c) (3). In particular, SLAS's exempt purpose is to advance laboratory science and technology through education, scientific research, and to serve as a public forum for the exchange of information related to laboratory science and technology.

== History ==
In early 2009, the Society for Biomolecular Sciences (SBS) and the Association for Laboratory Automation (ALA) began discussing ways the organizations could work together to further their respective and similar missions. These discussions led SBS and ALA to recognize that coordinating programs and activities offered many significant advantages. Accordingly, SBS and ALA assigned a task force to determine the viability of an SBS-ALA amalgamation. The task force unanimously concluded that both SBS and ALA could be strengthened by merging into a new entity that advanced their common missions and goals while respecting and protecting their unique individual histories and identities.

As of March 15, 2010, the two organizations publicly announced that they proposed to merge SBS and ALA into one organization, which would be "dedicated to advancing scientific research and discovery through laboratory technology". As of May 5, 2010, both memberships officially authorized the merger with more than 95% of the votes cast in favor of the plan. The inspectors for the proxy voting process reported that SBS and ALA exceeded quorum requirements by 124% and 218%, respectively, and certified the results as valid.

== Publications ==
SLAS publishes two scientific journals, SLAS Technology and SLAS Discovery, in partnership with SAGE Publications. SLAS Technology was published from 1996-2010 as the Journal of the Association for Laboratory Automation and from 2011-2016 as the Journal of Laboratory Automation (JALA).SLAS Discovery was published from 1996-2016 as the Journal of Biomolecular Screening. Special collections of SLAS Technology and SLAS Discovery have been published in December 2020, which are available online as open-access articles for research related to COVID-19.
