= Cyclic olefin polymer =

Names
- Other names Polynorbornene, COP, cyclic olefin polymer, cyclo olefin polymer, cyclo-olefin polymer

Identifiers
| CAS Number | 25038-76-0 |
| 3D model (JSmol) | Interactive image |
- SMILES: C12CC(CC1)C=C2

Properties
| Appearance | clear resin |
- Except where otherwise noted, data are given for materials in their standard state (at 25 °C [77 °F], 100 kPa). Infobox references

Cyclic olefin polymer (COP) is a type of amorphous polymer used in a wide variety of applications including pharmaceutical packaging and medical devices, optics and displays, and electronics.

== Chemical structure ==
COP is formed by ring-opening metathesis polymerization (ROMP) of cyclic olefin monomers such as norbornene, followed by partial or total hydrogenation. Modification of the monomer structure results in polymers with a range of glass transition temperatures, stiffness and viscosities. Commercial products include Zeon Chemical's ZEONEX^{®} and ZEONOR^{®} and Japan Synthetic Rubber's ARTON. An alternative process involving copolymerization with ethylene is used to make cyclic olefin copolymers (COC). These two types of cyclic olefin polymers were historically referred to as COC but are now recognized as distinct classes of polymers formed from different polymerization processes. Commercial products include Mitsui Chemical's APEL™ and TOPAS Advanced polymers' TOPAS^{®} COC. Though they share many of the same physical properties, cyclic olefin polymer (COP) formed by ROMP offers greater transparency and mechanical stability and its surface is more amenable to plasma treatment for optimizing cell growth.

== Properties ==
Cyclo Olefin Polymer (COP) has superior physical properties that make it well suited for medical and optical applications. It exhibits high purity, low extractables and leachables, has low surface energy, and it is chemically inert. Various fabrication methods can be used including compression molding, injection molding, laser ablation, and film extrusion to name a few. It is compatible with sterilization methods including newly developed NO_{2} processes. COP has exceptional optical clarity and exhibits extremely low birefringence which makes it well suited for optical applications such as virtual reality.

COP and COC are not compatible with non-polar solvents but have good chemical resistance to other solvents, acids and bases.

== Applications ==
=== Healthcare ===
Cyclo Olefin Polymer (COP) is gaining adoption in medical, pharmaceutical and life science applications by replacing or being used in combination with other materials, yielding superior products. There is no risk of pH shift from released alkali ions as there is in glass containers making it suitable for long-term storage of sensitive pharmaceuticals such as protein- or peptide-based drugs. COP has excellent dimensional stability and can reproducibly replicate micron-sized features of microfluidic devices and diagnostics with high aspect ratios.

In applications involving vacuum COP is amenable to coating with silica via plasma-enhanced chemical vapor deposition (PECVD). These coated materials are used for blood collection tubes (vacutainers) to reduce mass and improve safety for clinical workers. Similarly, coated COP vials are used for lyophilized (freeze-dried) proteins to give a more predictable and consistent heat flow rate during the lyophilization process.

In applications requiring liquid nitrogen temperatures COP vials are used over glass or other plastics because of their durability over a range of temperatures and for extended periods of time, without impacting the viability of the stored material. This makes COP a suitable material for storing both biopharmaceutical drug products as well as stem cells for cell therapies.

=== Optics ===
Cyclo Olefin Polymer (COP) is used for commercial optical applications because of its high insensitivity to moisture and thermal stability. COP has been used for polymer optical fibers because in addition to its optical qualities it maintains superior drawability over a wider temperature range than COC.

Cyclo Olefin Polymer (COP) films are also used in applications that require low birefringence such as augmented reality and virtual reality, projector lenses and head-up displays. In augmented reality devices COP films are used as plastic optical waveguides resulting in near-glass like performance but with reduced mass. In addition, the improved flexibility allows for easier fabrication and more design freedom.
