= Antifreeze =

Liquid additive

An antifreeze is an additive which lowers the freezing point of a water-based liquid. An antifreeze mixture is used to achieve freezing-point depression for cold environments. Common antifreezes also increase the boiling point of the liquid, allowing higher coolant temperature. However, all common antifreeze additives also have lower heat capacities than water, and do reduce water's ability to act as a coolant when added to it.

Because water has good properties as a coolant, water plus antifreeze is used in internal combustion engines and other heat transfer applications, such as HVAC chillers and solar water heaters. The purpose of antifreeze is to prevent a rigid enclosure from bursting due to expansion when water freezes. Commercially, both the additive (pure concentrate) and the mixture (diluted solution) are called antifreeze, depending on the context. Careful selection of an antifreeze can enable a wide temperature range in which the mixture remains in the liquid phase, which is critical to efficient heat transfer and the proper functioning of heat exchangers. Most if not all commercial antifreeze formulations intended for use in heat transfer applications include anti-corrosion and anti-cavitation agents (that protect the hydraulic circuit from progressive wear).

== Principles and history ==
Water was the original coolant for internal combustion engines. It is cheap, nontoxic, and has a high heat capacity. However it has a liquid range of only 100 degrees Centigrade, and it expands upon freezing. To address these problems, alternative coolants with improved properties were developed. Freezing and boiling points are colligative properties of a solution, which depend on the concentration of dissolved substances. Salts, for example, lower the freeing point of aqueous solutions and as such are commonly used for de-icing due to their low cost. However, salt solutions typically cannot be used in cooling systems because they induce corrosion of metals. Solutions of organic compounds, especially alcohols, in water are effective. Alcohols, diols, or polyols such as methanol, ethanol, ethylene glycol, etc. have been the basis of all antifreezes since they were commercialized in the 1920s.

== Use and occurrence ==
=== Automotive and internal combustion engine use ===
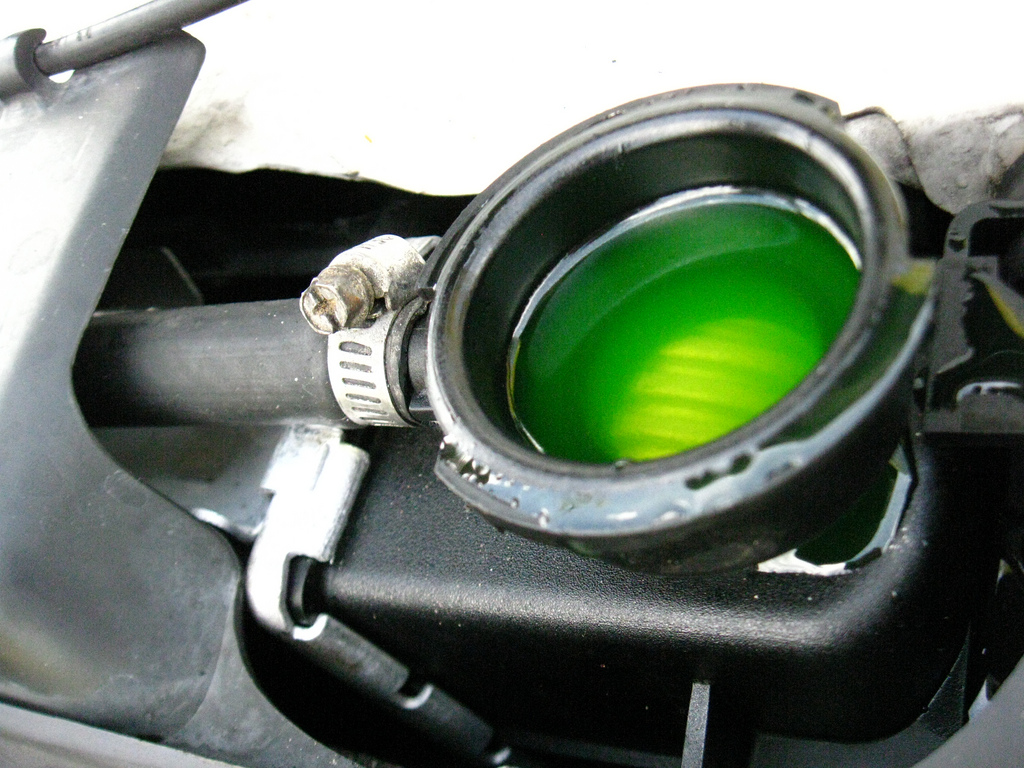
Fluorescent green-dyed antifreeze is visible in the radiator header tank when car radiator cap is removed

Most automotive engines are "water"-cooled to remove waste heat, though the "water" used is actually a mixture of water and antifreeze. The term engine coolant is widely used in the automotive industry, which covers its primary function of convective heat transfer for internal combustion engines. When used in an automotive context, corrosion inhibitors are added to help protect vehicles' radiators, which often contain a range of electrochemically incompatible metals (aluminum, cast iron, copper, brass, solder, etc.). Water pump seal lubricant is also added.

Antifreeze was developed to overcome the shortcomings of water as a heat transfer fluid.

On the other hand, if the engine coolant gets too hot, it may boil while inside the engine, causing voids (pockets of steam), leading to localized hot spots and the catastrophic failure of the engine. If plain water were to be used as an engine coolant in northern climates freezing would occur, causing significant internal engine damage. Also, plain water would increase the prevalence of galvanic corrosion. Proper engine coolant and a pressurized coolant system obviate these shortcomings of water. With proper antifreeze, a wide temperature range can be tolerated by the engine coolant, such as −34 °F (−37 °C) to +265 °F (129 °C) for 50% (by volume) propylene glycol diluted with distilled water and a 15 psi pressurized coolant system.

Early engine coolant antifreeze was methanol (methyl alcohol). Ethylene glycol was developed because its higher boiling point was more compatible with heating systems.

=== Engine coolant standards ===
The Volkswagen Group has been particularly committed to the development of coolants and their standards (VW TL 774) in collaboration with Haertol Chemie from Magdeburg. VW standards include: G11, G12, G12+, G12++, G13 and G12evo.

Another company involved in the development is BASF (Glysantin), whose standards are: G30, G40, G48, G05, G33, and G34.

Volkswagen Group:

- G11: VW TL 774 C
- G12 / G12+: VW TL 774 D/F
- G12++: VW TL 774 G
- G13: VW TL 774 J
- G12evo: VW TL 774 L

BASF:

- Glysantin G48: matches VW TL 774-C
- Glysantin G30: matches VW TL 774-D/F
- Glysantin G40: matches VW TL 774-G and VW TL 774-J
- Glysantin G64: matches VW TL 774-L

=== Other industrial uses ===
The most common water-based antifreeze solutions used in electronics cooling are mixtures of water and either ethylene glycol (EGW) or propylene glycol (PGW). The use of ethylene glycol has a longer history, especially in the automotive industry. However, EGW solutions formulated for the automotive industry often have silicate based rust inhibitors that can coat and/or clog heat exchanger surfaces. Ethylene glycol is listed as a toxic chemical requiring care in handling and disposal.

Ethylene glycol has desirable thermal properties, including a high boiling point, low freezing point, stability over a wide range of temperatures, and high specific heat and thermal conductivity. It also has a low viscosity and, therefore, reduced pumping requirements. Although EGW has more desirable physical properties than PGW, the latter coolant is used in applications where toxicity might be a concern. PGW is generally recognized as safe for use in food or food processing applications, and can also be used in enclosed spaces.

Similar mixtures are commonly used in HVAC and industrial heating or cooling systems as a high-capacity heat transfer medium. Many formulations have corrosion inhibitors, and it is expected that these chemicals will be replenished (manually or under automatic control) to keep expensive piping and equipment from corroding.

=== Biological antifreezes ===
Antifreeze proteins refer to chemical compounds produced by certain animals, plants, and other organisms that prevent the formation of ice. In this way, these compounds allow their host organism to operate at temperatures well below the freezing point of water. Antifreeze proteins bind to small ice crystals to inhibit growth and recrystallization of ice that would otherwise be fatal.

Cryoprotectants are commonly used in cryobiology to prevent or inhibit freezing in sperm, blood, stem cells, plant seeds, etc. Ethylene glycol, propylene glycol, and glycerol (all used in automotive antifreeze) are commonly used as biological cryoprotectants.

== Primary agents ==
=== Ethylene glycol ===
Ethylene glycol

Most antifreeze is made by mixing distilled water with additives and a base product, usually MEG (mono ethylene glycol) or MPG (mono propylene glycol). Ethylene glycol solutions first became available in 1926 and were marketed as "permanent antifreeze" since the higher boiling points provided advantages for summertime use as well as during cold weather. They are used today for a variety of applications, including automobiles, but there are lower-toxicity alternatives made with propylene glycol available.

When ethylene glycol is used in a system, it may become oxidized to five organic acids (formic, oxalic, glycolic, glyoxalic and acetic acid). Inhibited ethylene glycol antifreeze mixes are available, with additives that buffer the pH and preserve alkalinity of the solution to prevent oxidation of ethylene glycol and formation of these acids. Nitrites, silicates, borates and azoles may also be used to prevent corrosive attack on metal.

Ethylene glycol has a bittersweet taste and causes inebriation. The toxic effects of ingesting ethylene glycol occur because it is converted by the liver into four other chemicals that are much more toxic. The lethal dose of pure ethylene glycol is 1.4 ml/kg (3 US fluid ounces (90 ml) is lethal to a 140-pound (64 kg) person) but is much less lethal if treated within an hour. (see Ethylene glycol poisoning).

=== Propylene glycol ===
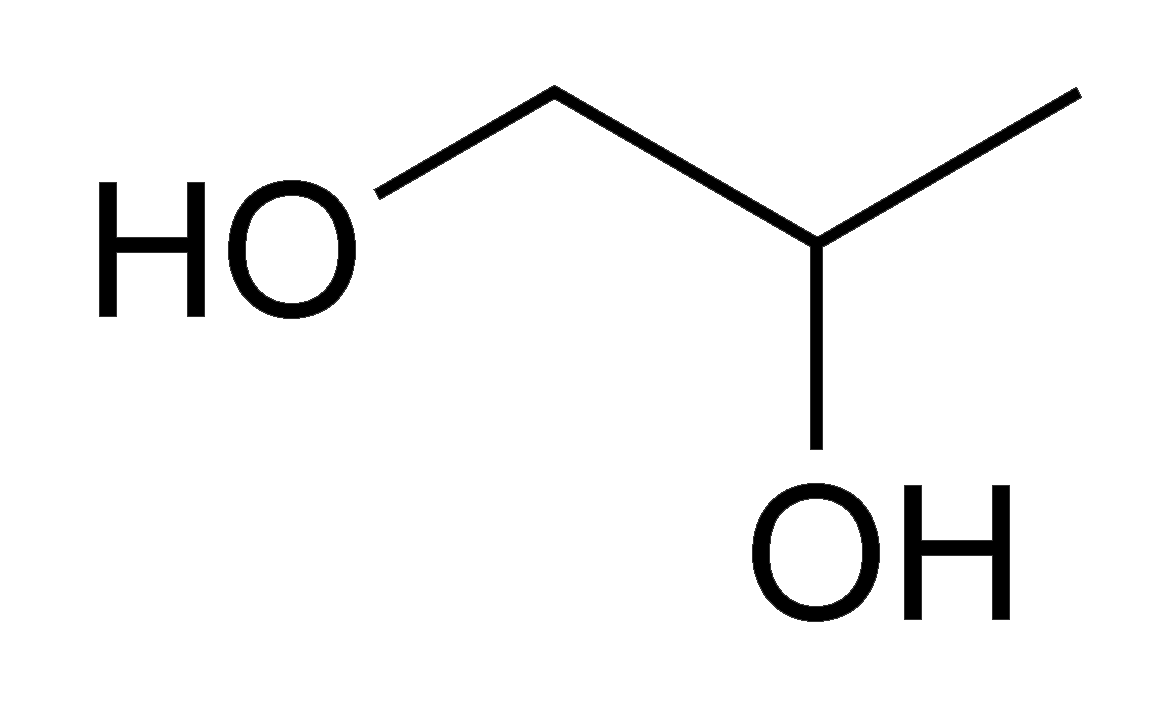
Propylene glycol

Propylene glycol is considerably less toxic than ethylene glycol and may be labeled as "non-toxic antifreeze". It is used as antifreeze where ethylene glycol would be inappropriate, such as in food-processing systems or in water pipes in homes where incidental ingestion may be possible. For example, the U.S. FDA allows propylene glycol to be added to a large number of ultra-processed foods, including ice cream, frozen custard, salad dressings, and baked goods, and it is commonly used as the main ingredient in the "e-liquid" used in electronic cigarettes. Propylene glycol oxidizes to lactic acid.

Besides cooling system corrosion, biological fouling also occurs. Once bacterial slime starts to grow, the corrosion rate of the system increases. Maintenance of systems using glycol solution includes regular monitoring of freeze protection, pH, specific gravity, inhibitor level, color, and biological contamination.

Propylene glycol should be replaced when it turns a reddish color. When an aqueous solution of propylene glycol in a cooling or heating system develops a reddish or black color, this indicates that iron in the system is corroding significantly. In the absence of inhibitors, propylene glycol can react with oxygen and metal ions, generating various compounds including organic acids (e.g., formic, oxalic, acetic). These acids accelerate the corrosion of metals in the system.

=== Other antifreezes ===
Propylene glycol methyl ether is used as an antifreeze in diesel engines. It is more volatile than glycol.

Once used for automotive antifreeze, glycerol has the advantage of being non-toxic, withstands relatively high temperatures, and is noncorrosive. It is not however used widely. Glycerol was historically used as an antifreeze for automotive applications before being replaced by ethylene glycol. Volkswagen introduced G13 (TL 774-G) antifreezes containing glycerol in 2008, marketed as better for the environment due to its low toxicity and reduced CO_{2} emissions. However, since 2018, they have moved on to G12EVO (TL 774-L) which no longer contains glycerol.

Glycerol is mandated for use as an antifreeze in many sprinkler systems.

== Measuring the freeze point ==
Once antifreeze has been mixed with water and put into use, it periodically needs to be maintained. If engine coolant leaks, boils, or if the cooling system needs to be drained and refilled, the antifreeze's freeze protection will need to be considered. In other cases a vehicle may need to be operated in a colder environment, requiring more antifreeze and less water. Three methods are commonly employed to determine the freeze point of the solution by measuring the concentration:

1. Specific gravity—(using a hydrometer or some sort of floating indicator),
2. Refractometer—which measures the refractive index of the antifreeze solution, and
3. Test strips—specialized, disposable indicators made for this purpose.

Both specific gravity and refractive index (RI) are affected by temperature, although the former is affected much less. Temperature compensation is nevertheless recommended for RI measurement. Propylene glycol solutions cannot be tested using specific gravity because of ambiguous results (40% and 100% solutions have the same specific gravity), although typical uses rarely exceed 60% concentration.

The boiling point can be similarly determined from a concentration given by one of the three methods. Datasheets for glycol/water coolant mixtures are commonly available from chemical vendors.

== Corrosion inhibitors ==
Most commercial antifreeze formulations include corrosion inhibiting compounds, and a colored dye (commonly red, orange, yellow, fluorescent green, or blue) to aid in identification. A 1:1 dilution with water is usually used, resulting in a freezing point of about −34 °F (−37 °C), depending on the formulation. In warmer or colder areas, weaker or stronger dilutions are used, respectively, but a water/antifreeze ratio of 40/60 to 60/40 is frequently specified to ensure corrosion protection, and 70%/30% for maximum freeze prevention down to −84 °F (−64 °C).

=== Maintenance ===
In the absence of leaks, antifreeze chemicals such as ethylene glycol or propylene glycol may retain their basic properties indefinitely. By contrast, corrosion inhibitors are gradually used up, and must be replenished from time to time. Larger systems (such as HVAC systems) are often monitored by specialist firms which take responsibility for adding corrosion inhibitors and regulating coolant composition. For simplicity, most automotive manufacturers recommend periodic complete replacement of engine coolant, to simultaneously renew corrosion inhibitors and remove accumulated contaminants.

=== Traditional inhibitors ===
Traditionally, there were two major corrosion inhibitors used in vehicles: silicates and phosphates. American-made vehicles traditionally used both silicates and phosphates. European makes contain silicates and other inhibitors, but no phosphates. Japanese makes traditionally use phosphates and other inhibitors, but no silicates.

=== Organic acid technology ===
Most modern cars are built with organic acid technology (OAT) antifreeze (e.g., DEX-COOL), or with a hybrid organic acid technology (HOAT) formulation (e.g., Zerex G-05), both of which are claimed to have an extended service life of five years or 240,000 km (150,000 mi).

DEX-COOL specifically has caused controversy. Litigation has linked it with intake manifold gasket failures in General Motors' (GM's) 3.1L and 3.4L engines, and with other failures in 3.8L and 4.3L engines. One of the anti-corrosion components presented as sodium or potassium 2-ethylhexanoate and ethylhexanoic acid is incompatible with nylon 6,6 and silicone rubber, and is a known plasticizer. Class action lawsuits were registered in several states of the US, and in Canada, to address some of these claims. The first of these to reach a decision was in Missouri, where a settlement was announced early in December 2007. Late in March 2008, GM agreed to compensate complainants in the remaining 49 states. GM (Motors Liquidation Company) filed for bankruptcy in 2009, which tied up the outstanding claims until a court determines who gets paid.

According to the DEX-COOL manufacturer, "mixing a 'green' [non-OAT] coolant with DEX-COOL reduces the batch's change interval to 2 years or 50,000 km (30,000 mi), but will otherwise cause no damage to the engine". DEX-COOL antifreeze uses two inhibitors: sebacate and 2-EHA (2-ethylhexanoic acid), the latter which works well with the hard water found in the United States, but is a plasticizer that can cause gaskets to leak.

According to internal GM documents, the ultimate cause appears to be operating vehicles for long periods of time with low coolant levels. The low coolant is caused by radiator pressure caps that get debris under the valve so that coolant is lost more rapidly. (The new caps and recovery bottles were introduced at the same time as DEX-COOL). This exposes hot engine components to air and vapors, causing corrosion and contamination of the coolant with iron oxide particles, which in turn can aggravate the pressure cap problem as contamination holds the caps open permanently.

Honda and Toyota's new extended life coolants use OAT with sebacate, but without the 2-EHA. Some added phosphates provide protection while the OAT builds up. Honda specifically excludes 2-EHA from its formulas.

Typically, OAT antifreeze contains an orange dye to differentiate it from the conventional glycol-based coolants (green or yellow), though some OAT products may contain a red or mauve dye. Some of the newer OAT coolants claim to be compatible with all types of OAT and glycol-based coolants; these are typically green or yellow in color.

=== Hybrid organic acid technology ===
HOAT coolants typically mix an OAT with a traditional inhibitor, usually silicates.

An example is Zerex G05, which is a low-silicate, phosphate free formula that includes the benzoate inhibitor.

A HOAT coolant can have a life expectancy as high as 10 years / 180,000 miles.

==== Phosphate hybrid organic acid technology ====
P-HOAT coolants mix phosphates with HOAT. This technology is typically used in Asian makes and is often dyed red or blue.

==== Silicate hybrid organic acid technology ====
Si-OAT coolants mix silicates with HOAT. This technology is typically used in European makes and is often dyed pink.

== Additives ==
All automotive antifreeze formulations, including the newer organic acid (OAT antifreeze) formulations, are environmentally hazardous because of the blend of additives (around 5%), including lubricants, buffers, and corrosion inhibitors. Because the additives in antifreeze are proprietary, the safety data sheets (SDS) provided by the manufacturer list only those compounds which are considered to be significant safety hazards when used in accordance with the manufacturer's recommendations. Common additives include sodium silicate, disodium phosphate, sodium molybdate, sodium borate, denatonium benzoate, and dextrin or hydroxyethyl starch.

Disodium fluorescein dye is added to conventional ethylene glycol formulas to visually distinguish leaked amounts from other vehicle fluids, and as a marker of type to distinguish it from incompatible types. This dye fluoresces bright green when illuminated by blue or UV light from daylight or testing lamps.

Automotive antifreeze may have a characteristic odor due to the additive tolyltriazole, a corrosion inhibitor. The unpleasant odor in industrial-use tolyltriazole comes from impurities in the product that are formed from the toluidine isomers (ortho-, meta-, and para-toluidine) and meta-diamino toluene which are side-products in the manufacture of tolyltriazole. These side-products are highly reactive and produce volatile aromatic amines which are responsible for the unpleasant odor.

== Poisoning ==
Ethylene glycol, the main ingredient in some antifreeze, is poisonous to both people and other mammals. After ethylene glycol is ingested, it is metabolized into oxalic acid. Oxalic acid is dangerous as it can cause kidney failure, and thus a treatment for antifreeze poisoning is kidney dialysis. Common symptoms of poisoning are vomiting, confusion, abdominal pain, agitation, ataxia and hematuria. Long term damage such as kidney damage, brain damage, central nervous system damage, and blindness are common.

Antifreeze may be consumed by children and pets because of its sweet taste, and is also commonly consumed as a surrogate alcohol. Many formulations include bitter additives such as Denatonium to discourage consumption due to taste; however, many studies do not support embittering antifreeze to reduce its ingestion.

== See also ==
- Aircraft deicing fluid
- Antifreeze protein
- Air cooling
- Cryoprotectant
- Heater core
- Ice melt
- Internal combustion engine cooling
- Radiator
- Water cooling
- Waterless coolant
- Windshield washer fluid
