= Methylheptane =

Methylheptane may refer to:

- 2-Methylheptane
- 3-Methylheptane
- 4-Methylheptane
