= Guerbet reaction =

Chemical reaction

The Guerbet reaction, named after Marcel Guerbet (1861–1938), is an organic reaction that converts a primary alcohol into its β-alkylated dimer alcohol with loss of one equivalent of water. The process is of interest because it converts small chain alcohols into larger alcohols. Its main disadvantage is that the reaction produces a mixture of products.

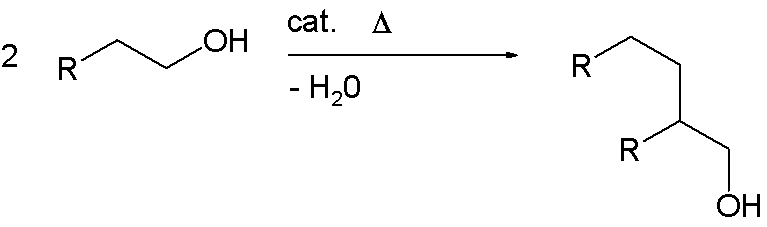
Guerbet Reaction

== Scope and applications ==
The original 1899 publication concerned the conversion of n-butanol to 2-ethylhexanol. 2-ethylhexanol is however more easily prepared by alternative methods (from butyraldehyde by aldol condensation).

Instead, the Guerbet reaction is mainly applied to fatty alcohols to afford oily products, which are called Guerbet alcohols. They are of commercial interest as components of cosmetics, plasticizers, and related applications. The reaction is conducted in the temperature range 180-360 °C, often in a sealed reactor. The reaction requires alkali metal hydroxides or alkoxides. Catalysts such as Raney Nickel are required to facilitate the hydrogen transfer steps.

While the Guerbet reaction is traditionally (and commercially) focused on fatty alcohols, it has been investigated for the dimerization of ethanol to butanol.

Organometallic catalysts have been investigated. A small amount of the diene 1,7-octadiene is required as a hydrogen acceptor.

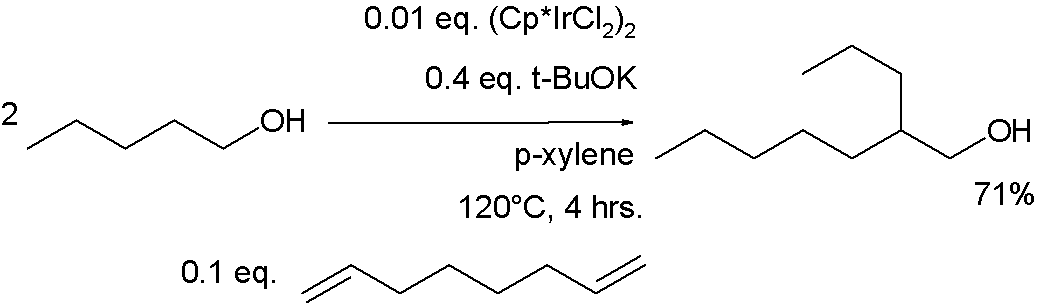
Guerbet Reaction Scope

== Mechanism ==
The reaction mechanism for this reaction is a four-step hydrogen auto-transfer process. In the first step the alcohol is oxidized to the aldehyde. These intermediates then react in an aldol condensation to the allyl aldehyde which the hydrogenation catalyst then reduces to the alcohol.

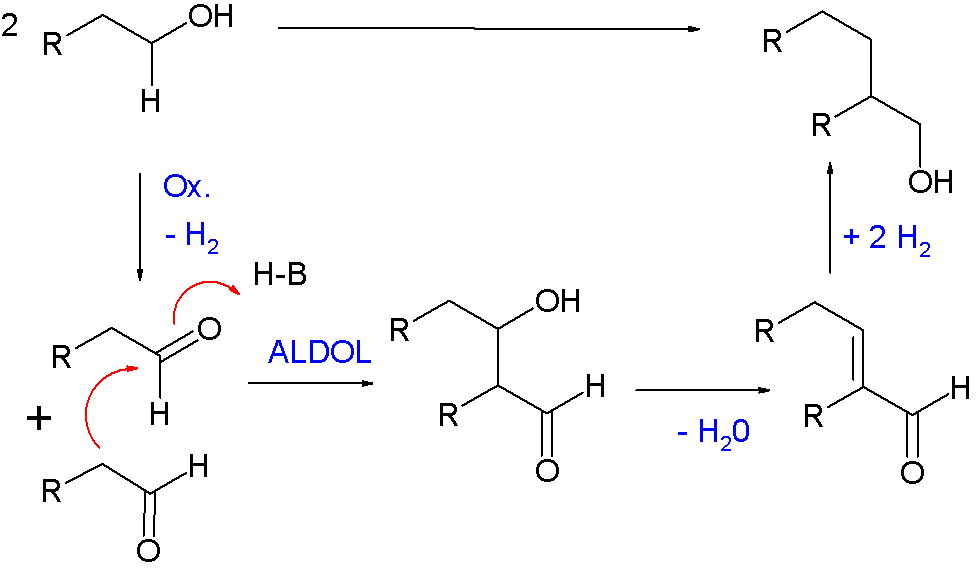
Guerbet Reaction Mechanism

The Cannizzaro reaction is a competing reaction when two aldehyde molecules react by disproportionation to form the corresponding alcohol and carboxylic acid. Another side reaction is the Tishchenko reaction.

== See also ==
- Oxo alcohols - a different reaction which gives similar products

Guerbet alcohols

- 2-Ethyl-1-butanol
- 2-Ethylhexanol
- 2-Propylheptan-1-ol
- 2-Butyl-1-octanol
