= N-Butyl lactate =

n-Butyl lactate

Names
- Preferred IUPAC name Butyl 2-hydroxypropanoate
- Other names Butyl ester of 2-hydroxypropanoic acid Butyl ester of lactic acid Butyl 2-hydroxypropanoate Butyl α-hydroxypropionate

Identifiers
CAS Number	138-22-7
3D model (JSmol)	Interactive image
ChEMBL	ChEMBL3183988
ChemSpider	8409
ECHA InfoCard	100.004.834
EC Number	205-316-4
MeSH	C114966
PubChem CID	8738
RTECS number	OD4025000
UNII	0UI63W814U
CompTox Dashboard (EPA)	DTXSID7042196
- InChI: InChI=1S/C7H14O3/c1-3-4-5-10-7(9)6(2)8/h6,8H,3-5H2,1-2H3 Key: MRABAEUHTLLEML-UHFFFAOYSA-N
- SMILES: CCCCOC(=O)C(C)O

Properties
Chemical formula	C_{7}H_{14}O_{3}
Molar mass	146.186 g·mol^{−1}
Appearance	Clear, colorless to white liquid
Odor	Mild, transient
Density	0.98 g/cm^{3} (20°C)
Melting point	−43 °C; −45 °F; 230 K
Boiling point	188 °C; 370 °F; 461 K
Solubility in water	slightly soluble
Solubility	Soluble in ethyl ether, ethanol
Vapor pressure	0.4 mmHg (20°C)

Hazards
Flash point	71 °C; 160 °F; 344 K
Autoignition temperature	382 °C (720 °F; 655 K)
- Lethal dose or concentration (LD, LC)
LD_{50} (median dose)	>5 g/kg (oral, rabbit) >2000 mg/kg (oral, rat) >5 g/kg (skin, rabbit) >5000 mg/kg (skin, rat); 12 g/kg (subcutaneous, rat)
LD_{Lo} (lowest published)	11 g/kg (subcutaneous, mouse)
- NIOSH (US health exposure limits)
REL (Recommended)	5 ppm (25 mg/m^{3})
- Except where otherwise noted, data are given for materials in their standard state (at 25 °C [77 °F], 100 kPa). Infobox references

n-Butyl lactate is an industrial chemical and food additive.

== Uses ==
In an industrial context, n-butyl lactate is used as a solvent and as a chemical feedstock. It is used as a dairy-related flavoring agent.

== Metabolism ==
It is metabolized to lactic acid, which is in turn metabolized to n-butanol, n-butyraldehyde, and n-butyric acid.

== Safety ==
n-Butyl lactate reacts with strong acids, strong bases, and oxidizers. It is also flammable. Exposure to dangerous amounts can occur through inhalation, ingestion, skin contact, or eye contact and causes irritation of the affected area, drowsiness, headache, central nervous system depression, nausea, and vomiting. It is approved as a food additive by the US Food and Drug Administration.
