= Aldol condensation =

Type of chemical reaction

Reaction type	Condensation reaction

Reaction
Ketone or Aldehyde
+
Ketone or Aldehyde
↓
α,β-unsaturated Aldehyde
or
α,β-unsaturated Ketone

Conditions
Temperature	+Δ, ~100°C (Note: Heat is usually added manually through the use of a hot plate, or is already present through the use of an exothermic catalyst reaction, such as when ^{−}OCH_{3} is used as the base. This drives the second step, by removing water, it allows the reactions equilibrium to continually favor the dehydration mechanism, converting the temporary addition product present to its final condensation product. Otherwise a significant amount of unwanted aldol addition side product would be formed alongside the aldol condensation product.)
Catalyst	^{−}OH or H^{+}

Identifiers
Organic Chemistry Portal	aldol-condensation
RSC ontology ID	RXNO:0000017

An aldol condensation is a condensation reaction in organic chemistry in which two carbonyl moieties (of aldehydes or ketones) react to form a β-hydroxyaldehyde or β-hydroxyketone (an aldol reaction), and this is then followed by dehydration to give a conjugated enone.

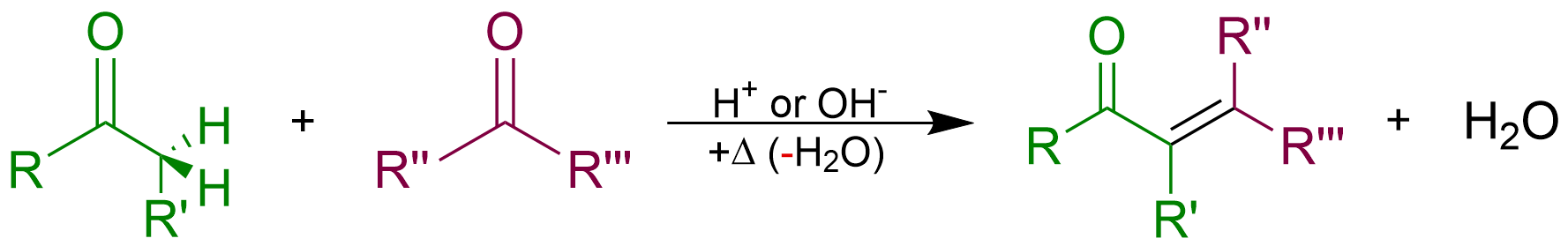
The overall reaction equation is as follows (where the Rs can be H)

Aldol condensations are important in organic synthesis and biochemistry as ways to form carbon–carbon bonds.

In its usual form, it involves the nucleophilic addition of a ketone enolate to an aldehyde to form a β-hydroxy ketone, or aldol (aldehyde + alcohol), a structural unit found in many naturally occurring molecules and pharmaceuticals.

The Aldol reaction

The term aldol condensation is also commonly used, especially in biochemistry, to refer to just the first (addition) stage of the process—the aldol reaction itself—as catalyzed by aldolases. However, the first step is formally an addition reaction rather than a condensation reaction because it does not involve the loss of a small molecule.

== Mechanism ==
The first part of this reaction is an Aldol reaction, the second part a dehydration—an elimination reaction (Involves removal of a water molecule or an alcohol molecule). Dehydration may be accompanied by decarboxylation when an activated carboxyl group is present. The aldol addition product can be dehydrated via two mechanisms; a strong base like potassium t-butoxide, potassium hydroxide or sodium hydride deprotonates the product to an enolate, which eliminates via the E1cB mechanism, while dehydration in acid proceeds via an E1 reaction mechanism. Depending on the nature of the desired product, the aldol condensation may be carried out under two broad types of conditions: kinetic control or thermodynamic control. Both ketones and aldehydes are suitable for aldol condensation reactions. In the examples below, aldehydes are used.

=== Base-catalyzed aldol condensation ===
The mechanism for base-catalyzed aldol condensation can be seen in the image below.

A mechanism for aldol condensation in basic conditions, which occurs via enolate intermediates and E1CB elimination.

Step 1 begins when a hydroxide ion (strong base) abstracts the highly acidic proton at the α-carbon of the aldehyde. This deprotonation causes the electrons from the C–H bond to shift and create an enolate via an E2-like process. The nucleophilic enolate attacks another instance of free aldehyde in step 2, resulting in the formation of a new C–C bond. In step 3, the negative charge is resolved by abstraction of a proton from water to form the aldol, thus regenerating the base catalyst. In the second part of the reaction, the base abstracts the second remaining proton on the α-carbon in an E1cb-Elimination. In the next step, reformation of the carbonyl eliminates a hydroxide leaving group, regenerating the base catalyst once again, and forming the aldol condensation product (an enone).

=== Acid-catalyzed aldol condensation ===
The mechanism for acid-catalyzed aldol condensation can be seen in the image below.

A mechanism for aldol condensation in acidic conditions, which occurs through enol intermediates and an elimination reaction.

Step 1 involves the activation of the first carbonyl via a proton enhances the electrophilicity of its carbon. Water acts as a base in step 2 to tautomerise this activated carbonyl into an enol, an equilibrium driven to the right by the acidic conditions. This enol is a nucleophile, which attacks an activated carbonyl group in a second molecule in step 3 to afford a protonated β-hydroxycarbonyl, which quickly dissociates its surplus proton in step 4. In step 5, the lone pair on the β-hydroxyl oxygen then accepts a free proton, activating it as a leaving group. Step 6 initiates an E1 reaction, in which water leaves, forming a carbocation. Another water molecule completes the E1 reaction by removing the α-proton, resolving the carbocation and forming a double bond. This finally affords the conjugated enone product.

Animation zum basenkat. Reaktionsmechanismus der Aldolkondensation	Animation zum säurekat. Reaktionsmechanismus der Aldolkondensation
animation, base catalyzed	animation, acid catalyzed

== Crossed aldol condensation ==
A crossed aldol condensation is a result of two dissimilar carbonyl compounds containing α-hydrogen(s) undergoing aldol condensation. Ordinarily, this leads to four possible products as either carbonyl compound can act as the nucleophile and self-condensation is possible, which makes a synthetically useless mixture. However, this problem can be avoided if one of the compounds does not contain an α-hydrogen, rendering it non-enolizable. In an aldol condensation between an aldehyde and a ketone, the ketone acts as the nucleophile, as its carbonyl carbon does not possess high electrophilic character due to the +I effect and steric hindrance. Usually, the crossed product is the major one. Any traces of the self-aldol product from the aldehyde may be disallowed by first preparing a mixture of a suitable base and the ketone and then adding the aldehyde slowly to the said reaction mixture. Using too concentrated base could lead to a competing Cannizzaro reaction.

== Examples ==
The Aldox process, developed by Royal Dutch Shell and Exxon, converts propene and syngas to 2-ethylhexanol via hydroformylation to butyraldehyde, aldol condensation to 2-ethylhexanal and finally hydrogenation.

Pentaerythritol is produced on a large scale beginning with crossed aldol condensation of acetaldehyde and three equivalents of formaldehyde to give pentaerythrose, which is further reduced in a Cannizzaro reaction.

== Scope ==
Ethyl 2-methylacetoacetate and campholenic aldehyde react in an Aldol condensation. The synthetic procedure is typical for this type of reaction. In the process, in addition to water, an equivalent of ethanol and carbon dioxide are lost in decarboxylation.

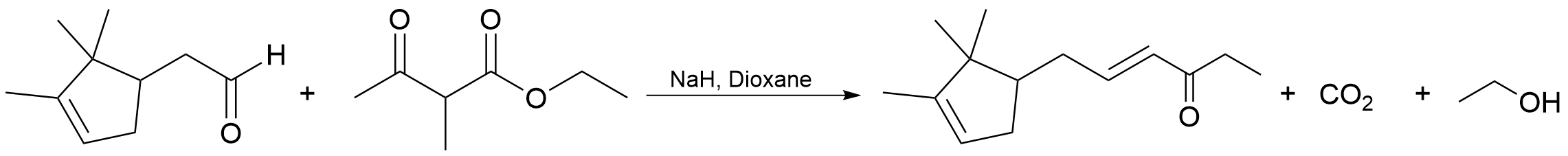

Ethyl glyoxylate 2 and glutaconate (diethyl-2-methylpent-2-enedioate) 1 react to isoprenetricarboxylic acid 3 (isoprene (2-methylbuta-1,3-diene) skeleton) with sodium ethoxide. This reaction product is very unstable with initial loss of carbon dioxide and followed by many secondary reactions. This is believed to be due to steric strain resulting from the methyl group and the carboxylic group in the cis-dienoid structure.

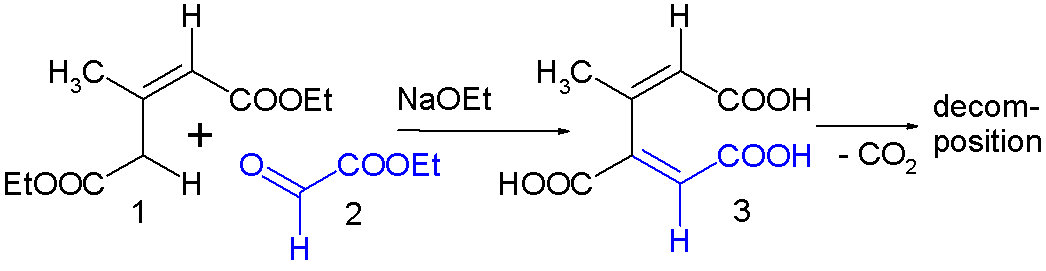
Isoprenetricarboxylic acid

Occasionally, an aldol condensation is buried in a multistep reaction or in catalytic cycle as in the following example:

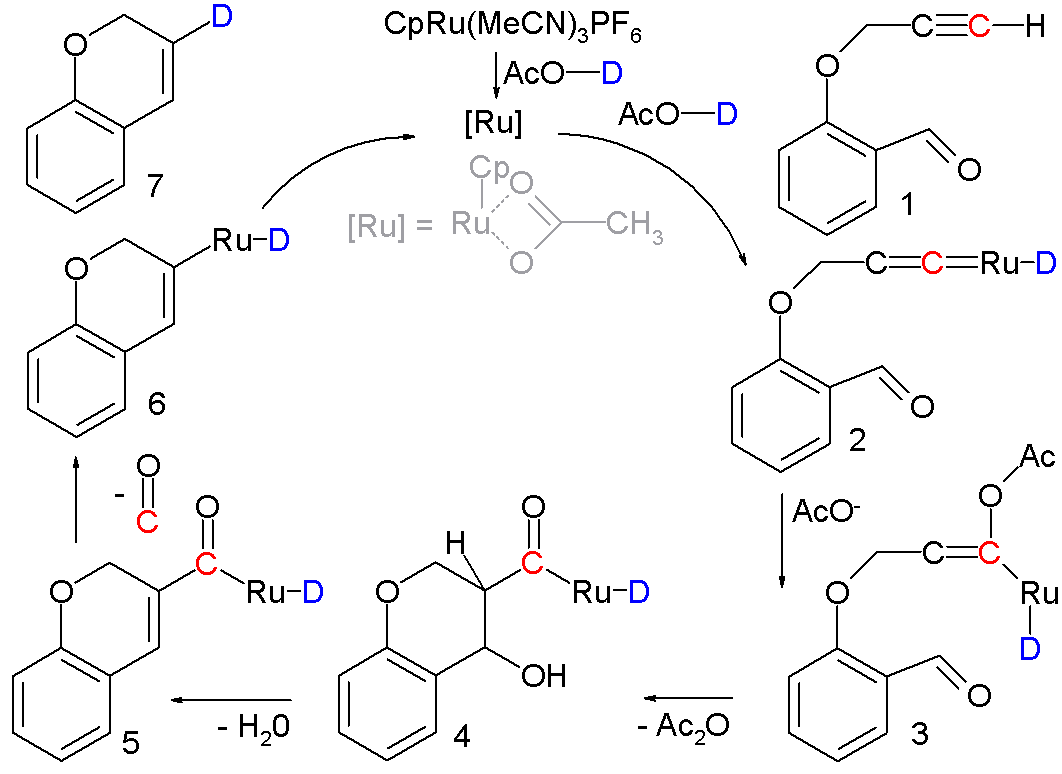
Ru Catalyzed Cyclization of Terminal Alkynals to Cycloalkenes

In this reaction an alkynal 1 is converted into a cycloalkene 7 with a ruthenium catalyst and the actual condensation takes place with intermediate 3 through 5. Support for the reaction mechanism is based on isotope labeling. (Note: The ruthenium catalyst, [CpRu(CH_{3}CN)_{3}]PF_{6}, has a cyclopentadienyl ligand, three acetonitrile ligands and a phosphorus hexafluoride counterion; the acidic proton in the solvent (acetic acid) is replaced by deuterium for isotopic labeling. Reaction conditions: 90°C, 24 hrs. 80% chemical yield. The first step is formation of the Transition metal carbene complex 2. Acetic acid adds to this intermediate in a nucleophilic addition to form enolate 3 followed by aldol condensation to 5 at which stage a molecule of carbon monoxide is lost to 6. The final step is reductive elimination to form the cycloalkene.)

The reaction between menthone ((2S,5R)-2-isopropyl-5-methylcyclohexanone) and anisaldehyde (4-methoxybenzaldehyde) is complicated due to steric shielding of the ketone group. This obstacle is overcome by using a strong base such as potassium hydroxide and a very polar solvent such as DMSO in the reaction below:

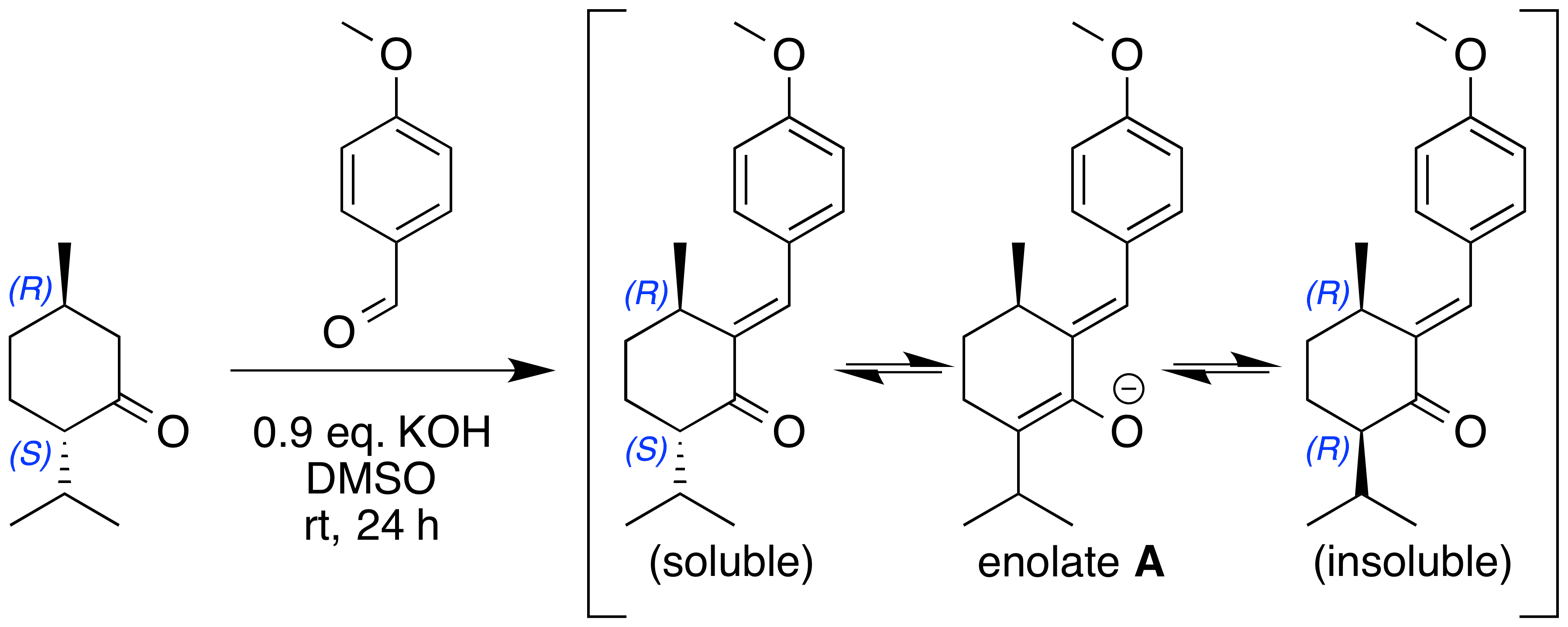
A Claisen–Schmidt reaction

The product can epimerize by way of a common intermediate—enolate A—to convert between the original (S,R) and the (R,R) epimers. The (R,R) product is insoluble in the reaction solvent whereas the (S,R) is soluble. The precipitation of the (R,R) product drives the epimerization equilibrium reaction to form this as the major product.

== Other condensation reactions ==
There are other reactions of carbonyl compounds similar to aldol condensation:

- When the base is an amine and the active hydrogen compound is sufficiently activated the reaction is called a Knoevenagel condensation.
- In a Perkin reaction the aldehyde is aromatic and the enolate generated from an anhydride.
- Claisen-Schmidt condensation between an aldehyde or ketone having an α-hydrogen with an aromatic carbonyl compound lacking an α-hydrogen.
- A Claisen condensation involves two ester compounds.
- A Dieckmann condensation involves two ester groups in the same molecule and yields a cyclic molecule
- In the Japp–Maitland condensation water is removed not by an elimination reaction but by a nucleophilic displacement
- A Robinson annulation involves an α,β-unsaturated ketone and a carbonyl group, which first engage in a Michael reaction prior to the aldol condensation.
- In the Guerbet reaction, an aldehyde, formed in situ from an alcohol, self-condenses to the dimerized alcohol.

== See also ==
- Auwers synthesis
- Aldol addition
