= 2-Ethylhexanoic acid =

8-Carbon branched fatty acid

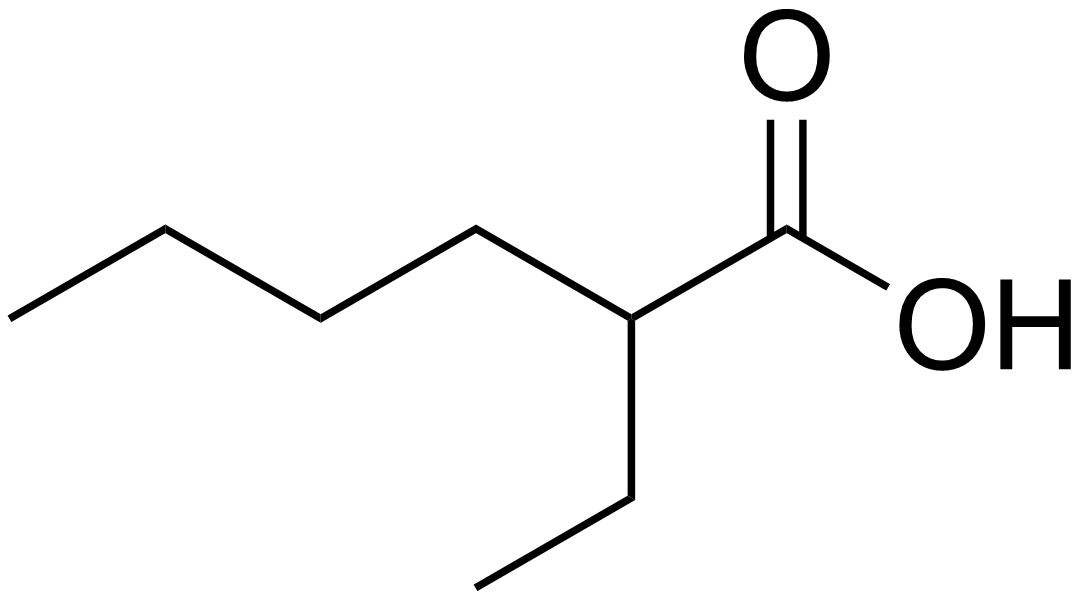
- Skeletal formula of 2-ethylhexanoic acid

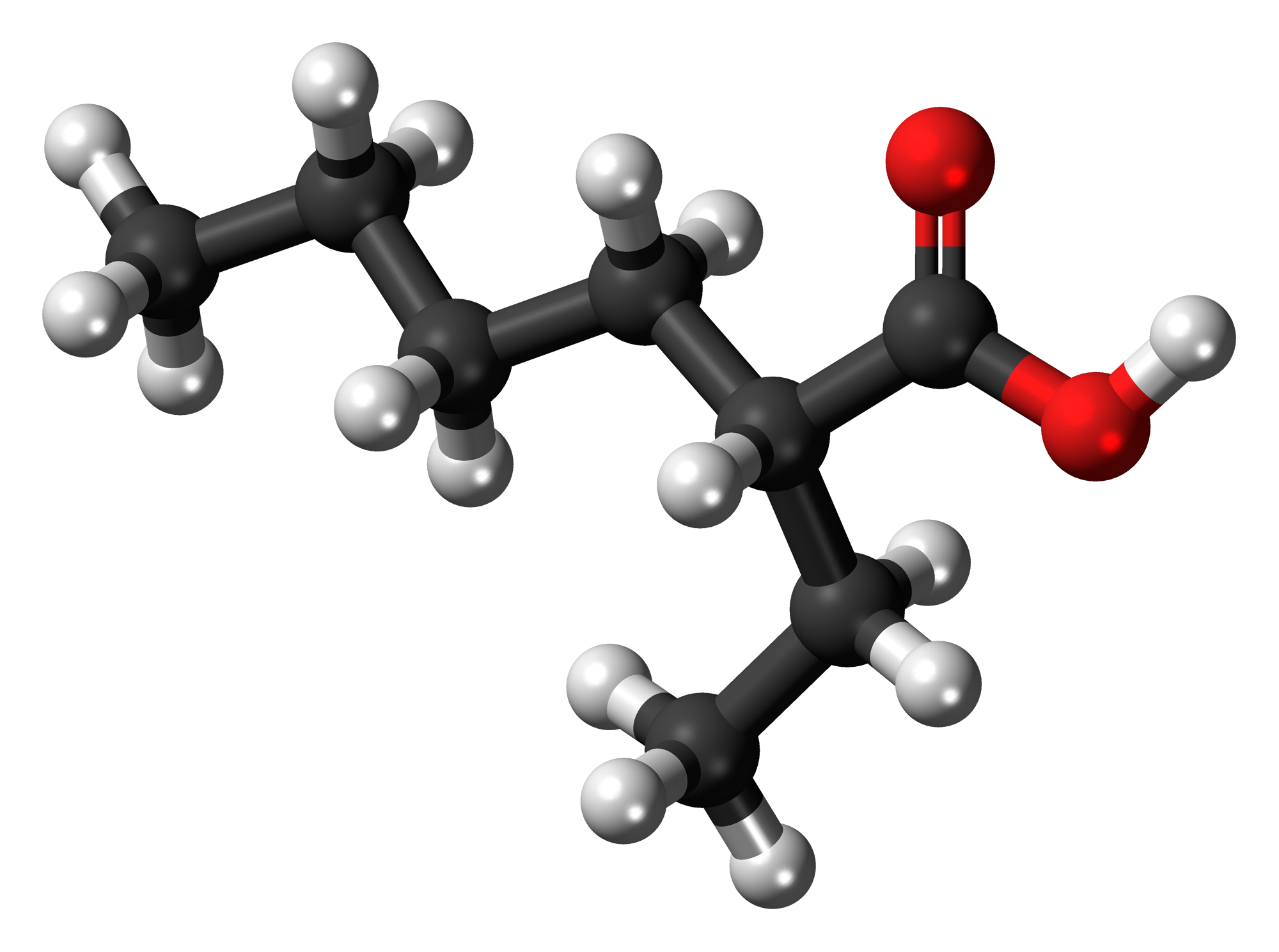

Names
- Preferred IUPAC name 2-Ethylhexanoic acid

Identifiers
CAS Number	149-57-5; 72377-05-0 S enantiomer; 56006-48-5 R enantiomer
3D model (JSmol)	Interactive image
Beilstein Reference	1750468
ChEMBL	ChEMBL1162485; ChEMBL1162487; ChEMBL1162486
ChemSpider	8373; 70431 R; 119200 S
ECHA InfoCard	100.005.222
EC Number	205-743-6
MeSH	2-ethylhexanoic+acid
PubChem CID	8697; 78052 R; 135309 S
RTECS number	MO7700000
UNII	01MU2J7VVZ
CompTox Dashboard (EPA)	DTXSID9025293
- InChI: InChI=1S/C8H16O2/c1-3-5-6-7(4-2)8(9)10/h7H,3-6H2,1-2H3,(H,9,10) Key: OBETXYAYXDNJHR-UHFFFAOYSA-N
- SMILES: CCCCC(CC)C(O)=O

Properties
Chemical formula	C_{8}H_{16}O_{2}
Molar mass	144.214 g·mol^{−1}
Appearance	Colorless liquid
Density	903 mg mL^{−1}
Melting point	−59.00 °C; −74.20 °F; 214.15 K
Boiling point	228.1 °C; 442.5 °F; 501.2 K
log P	2.579
Vapor pressure	<1 Pa (at 25 °C)
Acidity (pK_{a})	4.819
Basicity (pK_{b})	9.178
Refractive index (n_{D})	1.425

Thermochemistry
Std enthalpy of formation (Δ_{f}H^{⦵}_{298})	−635.1 kJ mol^{−1}
Std enthalpy of combustion (Δ_{c}H^{⦵}_{298})	−4.8013 – 4.7979 MJ mol^{−1}

Hazards
- GHS labelling
Pictograms	(GHS05: Corrosive) (GHS07: Exclamation mark) (GHS08: Health hazard)
Signal word	Danger
Hazard statements	H312, H318, H361
Precautionary statements	P280, P305+P351+P338
Flash point	114 °C (237 °F; 387 K)
Autoignition temperature	371 °C (700 °F; 644 K)
Explosive limits	0.9–6.7%
- Lethal dose or concentration (LD, LC)
LD_{50} (median dose)	1.142 g kg^{−1} (dermal, rabit); 3 g kg^{−1} (oral, rat)

Related compounds
Related compounds	2-Methylhexane; 3-Methylhexane; Valnoctamide; 2-Methylheptane; 3-Methylheptane; 2-Ethylhexanol; Valproic acid; Propylheptyl alcohol
- Except where otherwise noted, data are given for materials in their standard state (at 25 °C [77 °F], 100 kPa). verify (what is ?) Infobox references

2-Ethylhexanoic acid (2-EHA), commonly known as octoic acid, is the organic compound with the formula CH_{3}(CH_{2})_{3}CH(C_{2}H_{5})CO_{2}H. It is a carboxylic acid that is widely used to prepare lipophilic metal derivatives that are soluble in nonpolar organic solvents. 2-Ethylhexanoic acid is a colorless viscous oil. It is supplied as a racemic mixture. Esters and salts of 2-EHA are called 2-ethylhexanoates, e.g. potassium 2-ethylhexanoate.

== Production ==
2-Ethylhexanoic acid is produced industrially from butyraldehyde, which is obtained by hydroformylation of propylene. Aldol condensation of the aldehyde gives 2-ethylhexenal, which is hydrogenated to give 2-ethylhexanal. Oxidation of this aldehyde gives the carboxylic acid.

== Metal ethylhexanoates ==
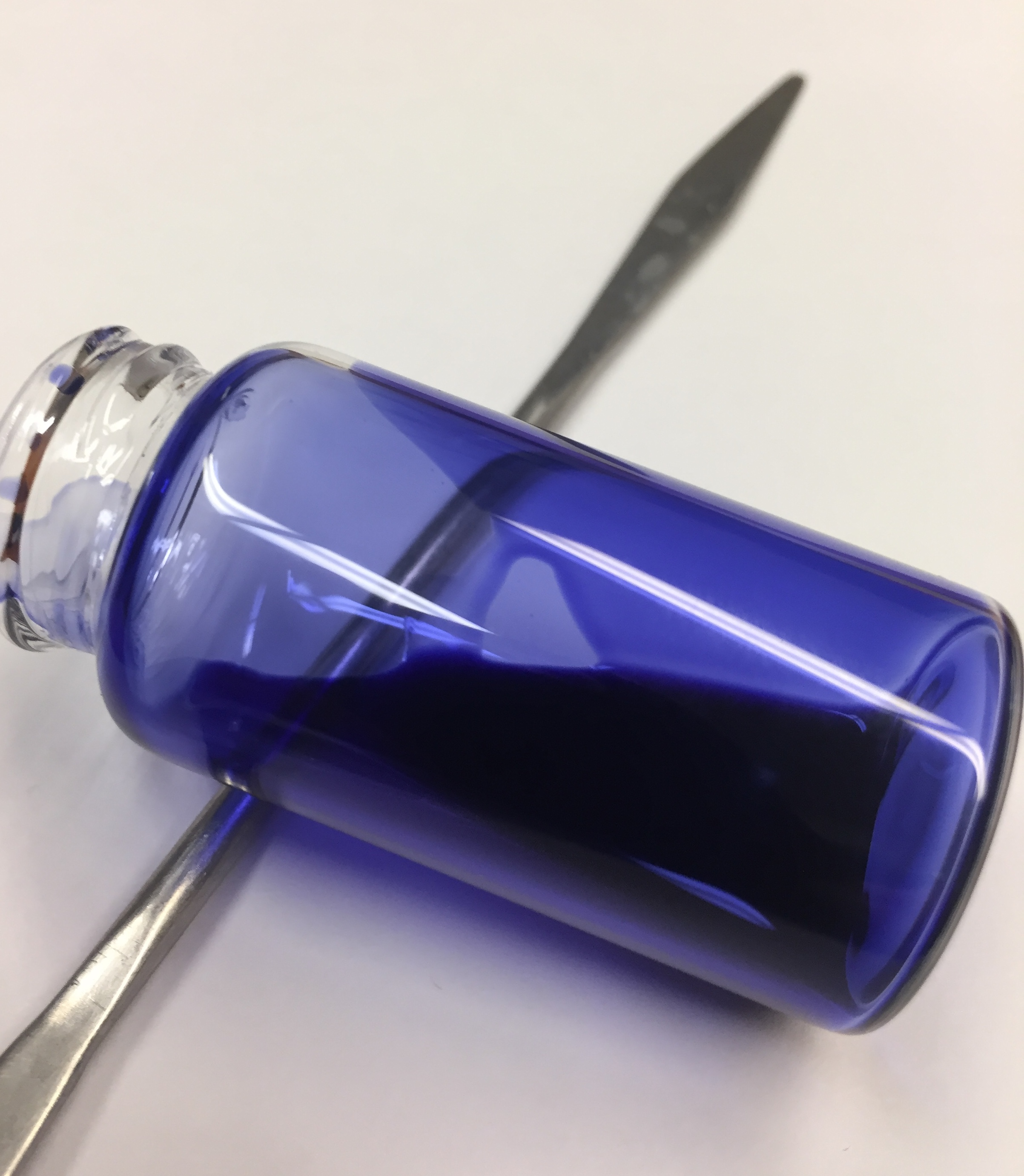
65% Solution of cobalt(II) bis(2-ethylhexanoate) in mineral spirits, tilted vial to illustrate color and viscosity.

Salts, esters, and coordination complexes derived from 2-ethylhexanoic acid are called 2-ethylhexanoates. 2-Ethylhexanoic acid forms compounds with metal cations that have stoichiometry as metal acetates. These ethylhexanoate complexes are used in organic and industrial chemical synthesis. They function as catalysts in polymerizations as well as for oxidation reactions as "oil drying agents." They are highly soluble in nonpolar solvents. These metal complexes are often described as salts. They are, however, not ionic but charge-neutral coordination complexes. Their structures are akin to the corresponding acetates.

=== Examples of metal ethylhexanoates ===
- Hydroxyl aluminium bis(2-ethylhexanoate), used as a thickener
- Tin(II) ethylhexanoate (CAS# 301-10-0), a catalyst for polylactide and poly(lactic-co-glycolic acid).
- Cobalt(II) ethylhexanoate (CAS# 136-52-7), a drier for alkyd resins
- Nickel(II) ethylhexanoate (CAS# 4454-16-4)

== Regulations ==
2-Ethylhexanoic acid is banned in the EU for use in cosmetics.

== See also ==
- 2-Ethylhexanol
