= C24H48O2 =

The molecular formula C_{24}H_{48}O_{2} (molar mass: 368.63 g/mol) may refer to:

- Ethylhexyl palmitate, or octyl palmitate
- Lignoceric acid, or tetracosanoic acid
