= M4 flame fuel thickening compound =

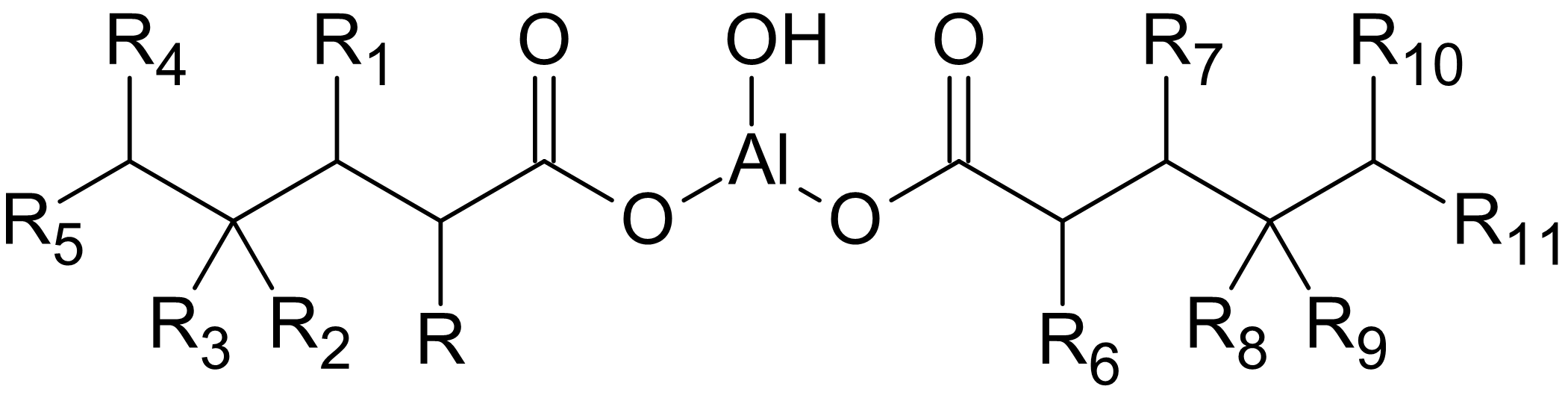
The chemical structure of aluminum soaps from oxo-isooctanoic acids.

M4 flame fuel thickening compound is a nonhygroscopic thickener, a di-acid aluminum soap of isooctanoic acids derived from isooctyl alcohol or isooctyl aldehyde, which are obtained from the oxidization of petroleum. M4 is used in fire bombs and incendiary weapons. It was developed alongside napalm and M3 (octal), and was their direct successor.

== See also ==
- Napalm
- MK-77
