= 2-Ethylhexanal =

Names
- Preferred IUPAC name 2-Ethylhexanal

Identifiers
| CAS Number | 123-05-7 |
| 3D model (JSmol) | Interactive image |
| ChEBI | CHEBI:87809 |
| ChEMBL | ChEMBL1558074 |
| ChemSpider | 28981 |
| ECHA InfoCard | 100.004.179 |
| EC Number | 204-596-5 |
| PubChem CID | 31241 |
| UNII | SEN8S34O6U |
| UN number | 1191 |
| CompTox Dashboard (EPA) | DTXSID9025291 |
- InChI: InChI=1S/C8H16O/c1-3-5-6-8(4-2)7-9/h7-8H,3-6H2,1-2H3 Key: LGYNIFWIKSEESD-UHFFFAOYSA-N
- SMILES: CCCCC(CC)C=O

Properties
| Chemical formula | C_{8}H_{16}O |
| Molar mass | 128.215 g·mol^{−1} |
| Appearance | colorless liquid |
| Density | 0.820 g/cm^{3} |
| Melting point | < −60 °C |
| Boiling point | 163 °C (325 °F; 436 K) |
| Refractive index (n_{D}) | 1.416 |

Hazards
- GHS labelling
| Pictograms | (GHS05: Corrosive) (GHS07: Exclamation mark) (GHS08: Health hazard) |
| Signal word | Warning |
| Hazard statements | H226, H315, H317, H319, H361 |
| Precautionary statements | P203, P210, P233, P240, P241, P242, P243, P261, P264, P264+P265, P272, P280, P302+P352, P303+P361+P353, P305+P351+P338, P318, P321, P333+P317, P337+P317, P362+P364, P370+P378, P403+P235, P405, P501 |
| NFPA 704 (fire diamond) | 2 2 1 |
- Except where otherwise noted, data are given for materials in their standard state (at 25 °C [77 °F], 100 kPa). Infobox references

2-Ethylhexanal is the organic compound with the formula CH_{3}CH_{2}CH_{2}CH_{2}CH(C_{2}H_{5})CHO. A colorless liquid, it is produced on a large scale industrially as a precursor to 2-ethylhexanoic acid and 2-ethylhexanol, both used as precursors to plasticizers. It was studied in the detergent industry since the 1930s.

2-Ethylhexanal is synthesized by aldol condensation of two equivalents of butyraldehyde followed by hydrogenation of the intermediate 2-ethylhexenal. The compound is chiral, but is mainly used as a racemic mixture.

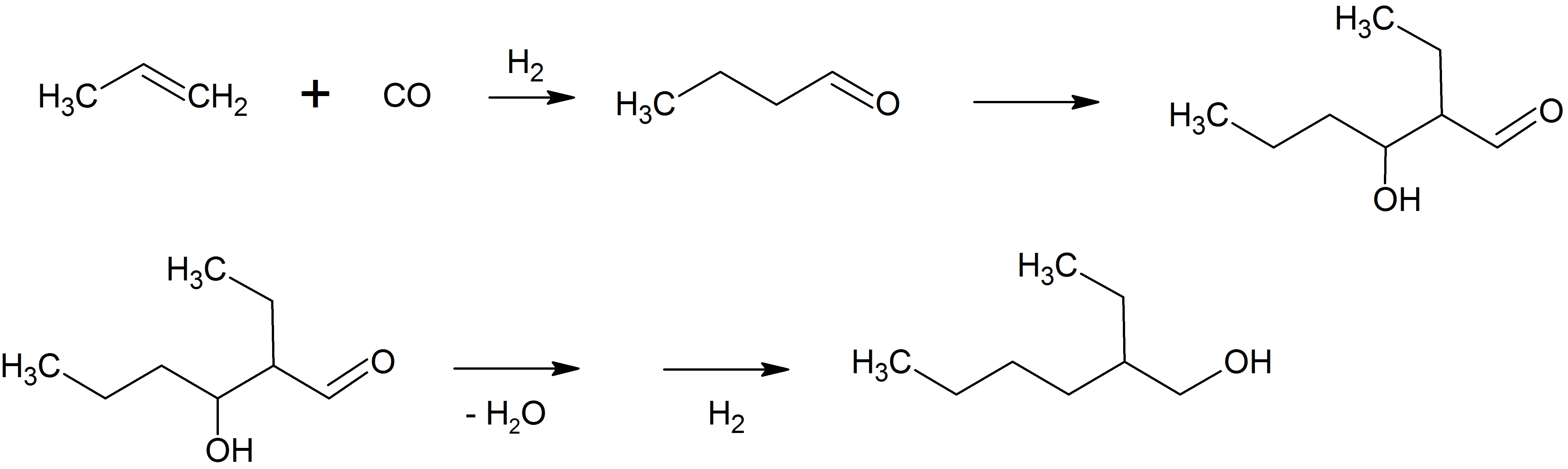
Synthesis of 2-Ethylhexanol

The n-butyraldehyde is made by hydroformylation of propylene, either in a self-contained plant or as the first step in a fully integrated facility. Most facilities make n-butanol and isobutanol in addition to 2-ethylhexanol. Alcohols prepared in this way are sometimes referred to as oxo alcohols. The overall process is very similar to that of the Guerbet reaction, by which it may also be produced.
