= Coolant =

Substance used to reduce or regulate the temperature of a system

A coolant is a substance, typically liquid, that is used to reduce or regulate the temperature of a system. An ideal coolant has high thermal capacity, low viscosity, and low cost, is non-toxic and chemically inert, and neither causes nor promotes corrosion of the cooling system. Some applications also require the coolant to be an electrical insulator.

While the term coolant is commonly used in automotive and HVAC applications, in industrial processing heat-transfer fluid is one technical term more often used in high-temperature as well as low-temperature manufacturing applications. The term also covers cutting fluids. Industrial cutting fluid has broadly been classified as water-soluble coolant and neat cutting fluid. Water-soluble coolant is oil in water emulsion. It has varying oil content from nil oil (synthetic coolant).

This coolant can either keep its phase, staying liquid or gaseous, or undergo a phase transition, with the latent heat adding to the cooling efficiency. The latter, when used to achieve below-ambient temperature, is more commonly known as refrigerant.

A coolant reservoir captures overflow of coolant in a cooling system.

== Gases ==
Air is a common form of a coolant. Air cooling uses either convective airflow (passive cooling) or a forced circulation using fans.

Hydrogen is used as a high-performance gaseous coolant. Its thermal conductivity is higher than all other gases, and it has high specific heat capacity, low density, and, therefore, low viscosity, which is an advantage for rotary machines susceptible to windage losses. Hydrogen-cooled turbogenerators are currently the most common electrical generators in large power plants.

Inert gases are used as coolants in gas-cooled nuclear reactors. Helium has a low tendency to absorb neutrons and become radioactive. Carbon dioxide is used in Magnox and AGR reactors.

Sulfur hexafluoride is used for cooling and insulating of some high-voltage power systems (circuit breakers, switches, some transformers, etc.).

Steam can be used where high specific heat capacity is required in gaseous form and the corrosive properties of hot water are accounted for.

== Two-phase ==
Some coolants are used in both liquid and gas form in the same circuit, taking advantage of the high specific latent heat of boiling/condensing phase change, the enthalpy of vaporization, in addition to the fluid's non-phase-change heat capacity.

Refrigerants are coolants used for reaching low temperatures by undergoing phase change between liquid and gas. Halomethanes were frequently used, most often R-12 and R-22, often with liquified propane or other haloalkanes like R-134a. Anhydrous ammonia is frequently used in large commercial systems, and sulfur dioxide was used in early mechanical refrigerators. Carbon dioxide (R-744) is used as a working fluid in climate control systems for cars, residential air conditioning, commercial refrigeration, and vending machines. Many otherwise excellent refrigerants are phased out for environmental reasons (the CFCs due to ozone layer effects, now many of their successors face restrictions due to global warming, e.g. the R134a).

Heat pipes are a special application of refrigerants.

Water is sometimes employed this way, e.g. in boiling water reactors. The phase change effect can be intentionally used, or can be detrimental.

Phase-change materials use the other phase transition between solid and liquid.

Liquid gases may fall here, or into refrigerants, as their temperature is often maintained by evaporation. Liquid nitrogen is the best known example encountered in laboratories. The phase change may not occur at the cooled interface, but on the surface of the liquid, to where the heat is transferred by convective or forced flow.

== Liquids ==
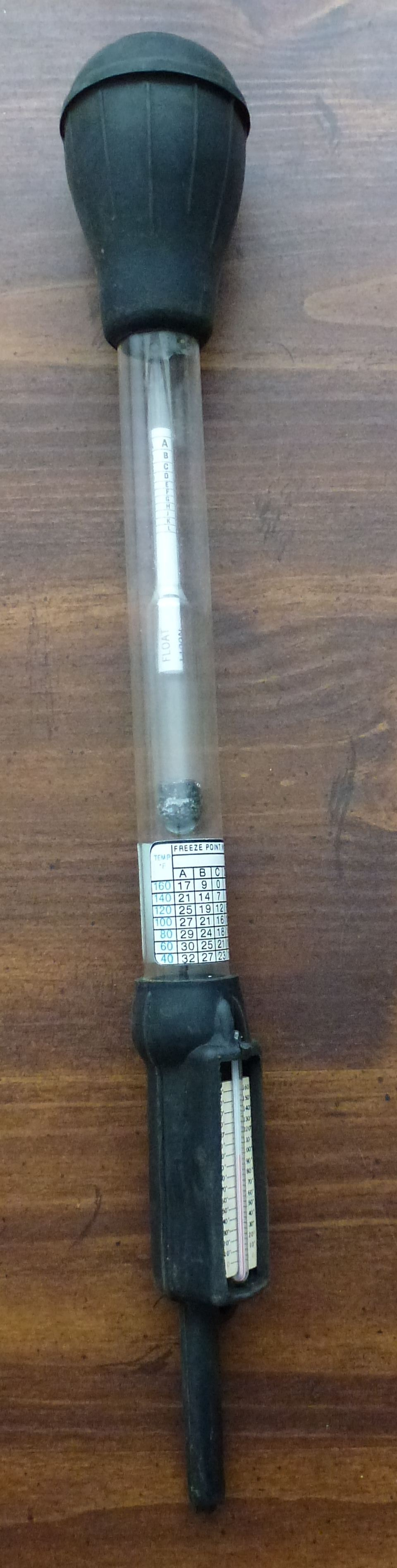
Device to measure the temperature to which the coolant protects the car from freezing

Water is the most common coolant. Its high heat capacity and low cost make it a suitable heat-transfer medium. It is usually used with additives, like corrosion inhibitors and antifreeze. Antifreeze, a solution of a suitable organic chemical (most often ethylene glycol, diethylene glycol, or propylene glycol) in water, is used when the water-based coolant has to withstand temperatures below 0 °C, or when its boiling point has to be raised. Betaine is a similar coolant, with the exception that it is made from pure plant juice, and is not toxic or difficult to dispose of ecologically.

- Very pure deionized water, due to its relatively low electrical conductivity, is used to cool some electrical equipment, often high-power transmitters and high-power vacuum tubes.
- Heavy water is a neutron moderator used in some nuclear reactors; it also has a secondary function as their coolant. Light water reactors, both boiling water and pressurised water reactors the most common type, use ordinary (light) water. Some designs, e.g. CANDU reactor, use both types; heavy water in the nonpressurized calandria tank as the moderator and a supplementary coolant, and light water as the primary heat transfer fluid.

Polyalkylene glycol (PAG) is used as high temperature, thermally stable heat transfer fluids exhibiting strong resistance to oxidation. Modern PAGs can also be non-toxic and non-hazardous.

Cutting fluid is a coolant that also serves as a lubricant for metal-shaping machine tools.

Oils are often used for applications where water is unsuitable. With higher boiling points than water, oils can be raised to considerably higher temperatures (above 100 degrees Celsius) without introducing high pressures within the container or loop system in question. Many oils have uses encompassing heat transfer, lubrication, pressure transfer (hydraulic fluids), sometimes even fuel, or several such functions at once.

- Mineral oils serve as both coolants and lubricants in many mechanical gears. Some vegetable oils, e.g. castor oil are also used. Due to their high boiling points, mineral oils are used in portable electric radiator-style space heaters in residential applications, and in closed-loop systems for industrial process heating and cooling. Mineral oil is often used in submerged PC systems as it is non-conductive and therefore won't short circuit or damage any parts.
  - Polyphenyl ether oils are suitable for applications needing high temperature stability, very low volatility, inherent lubricity, and/or radiation resistance. Perfluoropolyether oils are their more chemically inert variant.
  - A eutectic mixture of diphenyl ether (73.5%) and biphenyl (26.5%) is used for its wide temperature range and stability to 400 °C.
  - Polychlorinated biphenyls and polychlorinated terphenyls were used in heat transfer applications, favored due to their low flammability, chemical resistance, hydrophobicity, and favorable electrical properties, but are now phased out due to their toxicity and bioaccumulation.
- Silicone oils and fluorocarbon oils (like fluorinert) are favored for their wide range of operating temperatures. However their high cost limits their applications.
- Transformer oil is used for cooling and additional electric insulation of high-power electric transformers. Mineral oils are usually used. Silicone oils are employed for special applications. Polychlorinated biphenyls were commonly used in old equipment, which now can possess risk of contamination.

Fuels are frequently used as coolants for engines. A cold fuel flows over some parts of the engine, absorbing its waste heat and being preheated before combustion. Kerosene and other jet fuels frequently serve in this role in aviation engines. Liquid hydrogen is used to cool nozzles of rocket engines.

Waterless coolant is used as an alternative to conventional water and ethylene glycol coolants. With higher boiling points than water (around 370F), the cooling technology resists boil over. The liquid also prevents corrosion.

Freons were frequently used for immersive cooling of e.g. electronics.

=== Molten metals and salts ===
Liquid fusible alloys can be used as coolants in applications where high temperature stability is required, e.g. some fast breeder nuclear reactors. Sodium (in sodium cooled fast reactors) or sodium-potassium alloy NaK are frequently used; in special cases lithium can be employed. Another liquid metal used as a coolant is lead, in e.g. lead cooled fast reactors, or a lead-bismuth alloy. Some early fast neutron reactors used mercury.

For certain applications the stems of automotive poppet valves may be hollow and filled with sodium to improve heat transport and transfer.

For very high temperature applications, e.g. molten salt reactors or very high temperature reactors, molten salts can be used as coolants. One of the possible combinations is the mix of sodium fluoride and sodium tetrafluoroborate (NaF-NaBF_{4}). Other choices are FLiBe and FLiNaK.

=== Liquid gases ===
Liquified gases are used as coolants for cryogenic applications, including cryo-electron microscopy, overclocking of computer processors, applications using superconductors, or extremely sensitive sensors and very low-noise amplifiers.

Carbon dioxide (chemical formula is CO_{2}) is used as a coolant replacement for cutting fluids. CO_{2} can provide controlled cooling at the cutting interface such that the cutting tool and the workpiece are held at ambient temperatures. The use of CO_{2} greatly extends tool life, and on most materials allows the operation to run faster. This is considered a very environmentally friendly method, especially when compared to the use of petroleum oils as lubricants; parts remain clean and dry, which often can eliminate secondary cleaning operations.

Liquid nitrogen, which boils at about −196 °C (77K), is the most common and least expensive coolant in use. Liquid air is used to a lesser extent, due to its liquid oxygen content, which makes it prone to cause fire or explosions when in contact with combustible materials (see oxyliquits).

Lower temperatures can be reached using liquified neon, which boils at about −246 °C. The lowest temperatures, used for the most powerful superconducting magnets, are reached using liquid helium.

Liquid hydrogen at −250 to −265 °C can also be used as a coolant. Liquid hydrogen is also used both as a fuel and as a coolant to cool nozzles and combustion chambers of rocket engines.

=== Nanofluids ===
A new class of coolants are nanofluids, which consist of a carrier liquid, such as water, dispersed with tiny nano-scale particles known as nanoparticles. Purpose-designed nanoparticles of e.g. CuO, alumina, titanium dioxide, carbon nanotubes, silica, or metals (e.g. copper, or silver nanorods) dispersed into the carrier liquid enhance the heat transfer capabilities of the resulting coolant compared to the carrier liquid alone. The enhancement can be theoretically as high as 350%. The experiments however did not prove so high thermal conductivity improvements, but found significant increase of the critical heat flux of the coolants.

Some significant improvements are achievable; e.g. silver nanorods of 55±12 nm diameter and 12.8 μm average length at 0.5 vol.% increased the thermal conductivity of water by 68%, and 0.5 vol.% of silver nanorods increased thermal conductivity of ethylene glycol based coolant by 98%. Alumina nanoparticles at 0.1% can increase the critical heat flux of water by as much as 70%; the particles form rough porous surface on the cooled object, which encourages formation of new bubbles, and their hydrophilic nature then helps pushing them away, hindering the formation of the steam layer. Nanofluid with the concentration more than 5% acts like non-Newtonian fluids.

== Solids ==
In some applications, solid materials are used as coolants. The materials require high energy to vaporize; this energy is then carried away by the vaporized gases. This approach is common in spaceflight, for ablative atmospheric reentry shields and for cooling of rocket engine nozzles. The same approach is also used for fire protection of structures, where ablative coating is applied.

Dry ice and water ice can be also used as coolants, when in direct contact with the structure being cooled. Sometimes an additional heat transfer fluid is used; water with ice and dry ice in acetone are two popular pairings.

Sublimation of water ice was used for cooling the space suit for Project Apollo.

== Biology ==
Most warm-blooded animals rely on coolants to maintain a consistent body temperature. One of the most common is found in mammals in which the body releases salt water, which quickly evaporates.
