= Waterless coolant =

Waterless coolant is a glycol-based liquid substance that does not contain water. Its boiling point of 191 °C (375 °F) is higher than that of water-based coolants and it resists the formation of corrosion. The substance was invented to circumvent the problems of vaporizing water. When water vaporizes, it retains only 4% of its thermal conductivity. Water-based coolants are safe at temperatures below the boiling point of water to maintain the pressure of the system. Waterless coolant has environmental benefits, including reducing the use of cooling fans and therefore improving fuel economy. The coolant does not generally need changing, reducing the hazardous waste following repeated coolant flushes.

== Automotive use ==
Waterless coolant is most prominently used in the cooling systems for motorsports, classic car, ATVs, UTVs, snowmobiles and older cars. Older cars often have non-pressurized cooling systems, and the water-based coolant can boil and overflow. Traditionally, this issue has been solved by topping off the radiator with water. This dilutes the coolant and the water can contain minerals harmful to the vehicle. Classic car owners have adopted waterless coolant to solve this problem. Jay Leno uses waterless coolant for his replica 1937 Bugatti Type 57SC Atlantic vehicle.

== Other uses ==
University of California, Los Angeles used waterless engine coolants in its backup generators partly to reduce labor costs, since traditional water and ethylene glycol-based coolants typically need replacing every three years. Waterless coolant lasts the life of the engine and does not require a pressurized system, which reduces stress on the cooling system plumbing. It has also been used to lower fuel usage by reducing the operating time of radiator fans, as done by some waste management departments.

== Primary agents ==
Waterless coolant is glycol-based. The liquid avoids corrosion and electrolysis while the additives remain soluble.

== Freeze point ==
Waterless coolant acts as an antifreeze, protecting engines to −40 °C (−40 °F).

== Disadvantages ==
Waterless coolant is generally more expensive than traditional water and ethylene glycol-based coolants.
