= 2-Ethylhexyl glycidyl ether =

Names
- Preferred IUPAC name {[(2-Ethylhexyl)oxy]methyl}oxirane

Identifiers
CAS Number	2461-15-6
3D model (JSmol)	Interactive image
ChEMBL	ChEMBL1412431
ChemSpider	16246
ECHA InfoCard	100.017.776
EC Number	219-553-6
PubChem CID	17162
UNII	LU1UZ98B89
CompTox Dashboard (EPA)	DTXSID6025301
- InChI: InChI=1S/C11H22O2/c1-3-5-6-10(4-2)7-12-8-11-9-13-11/h10-11H,3-9H2,1-2H3 Key: BBBUAWSVILPJLL-UHFFFAOYSA-N
- SMILES: O(CC1OC1)CC(CC)CCCC

Properties
Chemical formula	C_{11}H_{22}O_{2}
Molar mass	186.295 g·mol^{−1}

Hazards
- GHS labelling
Pictograms	(GHS07: Exclamation mark)
Signal word	Warning
Hazard statements	H315, H317, H319, H335
Precautionary statements	P261, P264, P264+P265, P271, P272, P280, P302+P352, P304+P340, P305+P351+P338, P319, P321, P332+P317, P333+P313, P337+P317, P362+P364, P403+P233, P405, P501
- Except where otherwise noted, data are given for materials in their standard state (at 25 °C [77 °F], 100 kPa). Infobox references

2-Ethylhexyl glycidyl ether is a liquid organic molecule with formula C_{11}H_{22}O_{2} an industrial chemical used to reduce the viscosity of epoxy resins. These are then used in adhesives, sealants, and paints or coatings. It has the CAS Registry Number of 2461-15-6. It has the IUPAC name of 2-(2-ethylhexoxymethyl)oxirane. It also finds use in other polymer based applications.

== Synthesis ==
2-Ethylhexanol and epichlorohydrin are reacted in the presence of a Lewis acid catalyst in a condensation reaction to form a halohydrin. This is followed by a caustic dehydrochlorination, to form 2-ethylhexyl glycidyl ether. The waste products are water and sodium chloride and excess caustic soda. One of the quality control tests would involve measuring the Epoxy value by determination of the epoxy equivalent weight.

== Commercial ==
The material is produced domestically in the United States and is also produced in other parts of the world. Over 13 million kg were exported from China in 2019.

== Uses ==
As an Epoxy modifier it is classed as an epoxy reactive diluent. As well as being used as an epoxy resin diluent, it maybe further reacted to produce cosmetics. It is also used to synthesize other molecules. The use of the diluent does effect mechanical properties and microstructure of epoxy resins.

== Safety ==
The safety of the product is fairly well understood. It is classed as a skin sensitizer.

== See also ==
- Epoxide
- Glycidol

== External Websites ==
- Sachem Glycidyl Ethers
- Cameo Chemicals
- Hexion website
- Miller-Stephenson Diluents
