= Ethylhexyl palmitate =

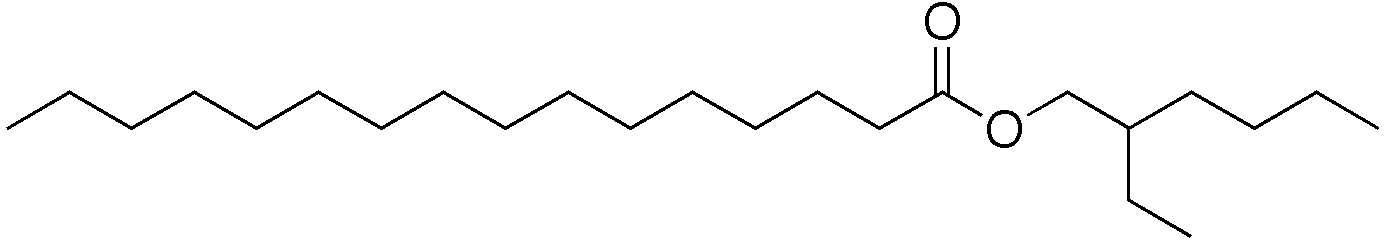

Names
- IUPAC name Hexadecanoic acid 2-ethylhexyl ester
- Other names Octyl palmitate

Identifiers
CAS Number	29806-73-3
3D model (JSmol)	Interactive image
ChemSpider	8649628
ECHA InfoCard	100.045.314
PubChem CID	62851
UNII	2865993309
CompTox Dashboard (EPA)	DTXSID3027958
- InChI: InChI=1S/C24H48O2/c1-4-7-9-10-11-12-13-14-15-16-17-18-20-22-24(25)26-23(6-3)21-19-8-5-2/h23H,4-22H2,1-3H3 Key: GJQLBGWSDGMZKM-UHFFFAOYSA-N; InChI=1/C24H48O2/c1-4-7-9-10-11-12-13-14-15-16-17-18-20-22-24(25)26-23(6-3)21-19-8-5-2/h23H,4-22H2,1-3H3 Key: GJQLBGWSDGMZKM-UHFFFAOYAS
- SMILES: O=C(OC(CCCCC)CC)CCCCCCCCCCCCCCC

Properties
Chemical formula	C_{24}H_{48}O_{2}
Molar mass	368.646 g·mol^{−1}
- Except where otherwise noted, data are given for materials in their standard state (at 25 °C [77 °F], 100 kPa). verify (what is ?) Infobox references

Ethylhexyl palmitate, also known as octyl palmitate, is the fatty acid ester derived from 2-ethylhexanol and palmitic acid. It is frequently utilized in cosmetic formulations.

== Chemical structure ==
Ethylhexyl palmitate is a branched saturated fatty ester derived from ethylhexyl alcohol and palmitic acid.

== Physical properties ==
Ethylhexyl palmitate is a clear, colorless liquid with a slightly fatty odor at room temperature.

The ester is synthesized by reacting palmitic acid and 2-ethylhexanol in the presence of an acid catalyst.

== Uses ==
Ethylhexyl palmitate is used in cosmetic formulations as a solvent, carrying agent, pigment wetting agent, fragrance fixative and emollient. Its dry-slip skinfeel is similar to some silicone derivatives.
