= Octane =

Hydrocarbon compound with the formula C8H18

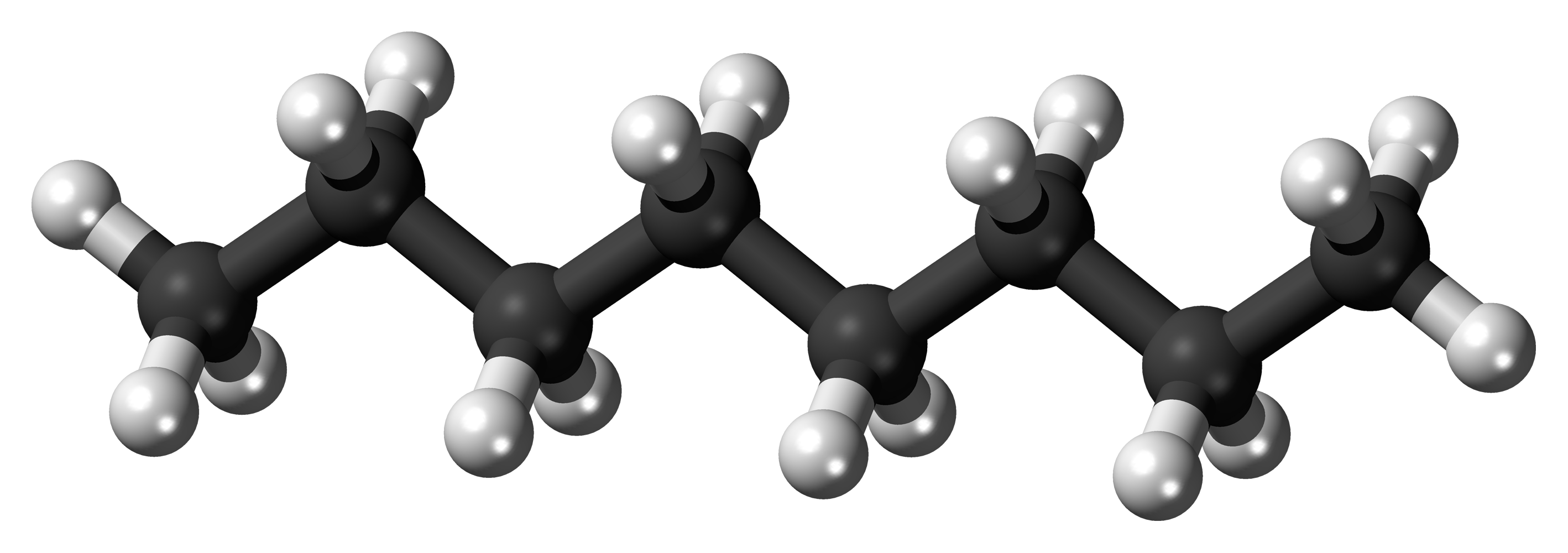

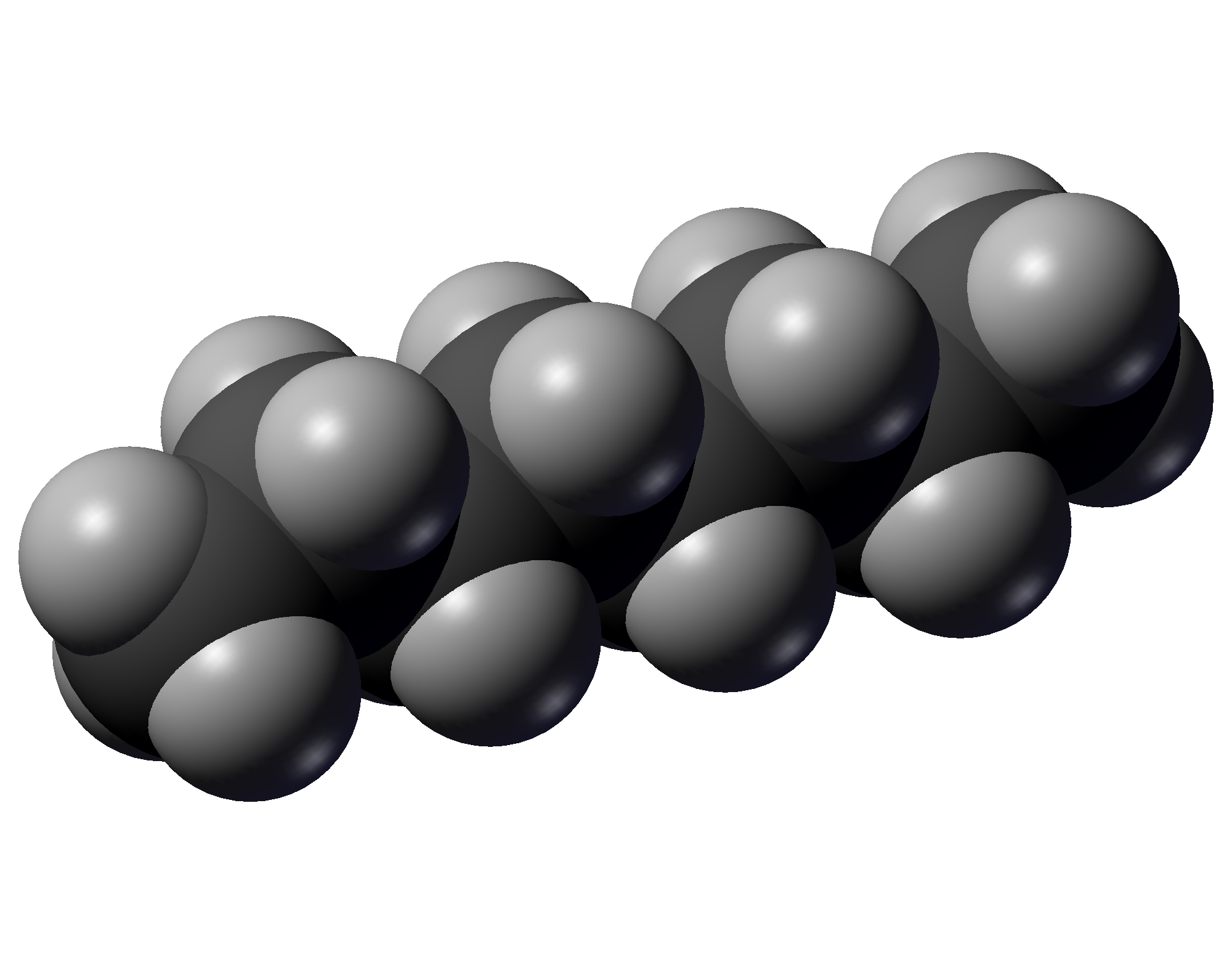

Names
- Systematic IUPAC name Octane
- Other names n-Octane

Identifiers
| CAS Number | 111-65-9 |
| 3D model (JSmol) | Interactive image |
| Beilstein Reference | 1696875 |
| ChEBI | CHEBI:17590 |
| ChEMBL | ChEMBL134886 |
| ChemSpider | 349 |
| DrugBank | DB02440 |
| ECHA InfoCard | 100.003.539 |
| EC Number | 203-892-1 |
| Gmelin Reference | 82412 |
| KEGG | C01387 |
| MeSH | octane |
| PubChem CID | 356 |
| RTECS number | RG8400000 |
| UNII | X1RV0B2FJV |
| UN number | 1262 |
| CompTox Dashboard (EPA) | DTXSID0026882 |
- InChI: InChI=1S/C8H18/c1-3-5-7-8-6-4-2/h3-8H2,1-2H3 Key: TVMXDCGIABBOFY-UHFFFAOYSA-N
- SMILES: CCCCCCCC

Properties
| Chemical formula | C_{8}H_{18} |
| Molar mass | 114.232 g·mol^{−1} |
| Appearance | Colourless liquid |
| Odor | Gasoline-like |
| Density | 0.6986 g/cm^{3} |
| Melting point | −57.1 to −56.6 °C; −70.9 to −69.8 °F; 216.0 to 216.6 K |
| Boiling point | 125.1 to 126.1 °C; 257.1 to 258.9 °F; 398.2 to 399.2 K |
| Solubility in water | 0.07 mg / 100 g (at 298 K) |
| log P | 4.783 |
| Vapor pressure | 1.47 kPa (at 20.0 °C) |
| Henry's law constant (k_{H}) | 29 nmol/(Pa·kg) |
| Conjugate acid | Octonium |
| Magnetic susceptibility (χ) | −96.63·10^{−6} cm^{3}/mol |
| Refractive index (n_{D}) | 1.398 |
| Viscosity | 0.509 mPa·s (25 °C); 0.542 mPa·s (20 °C) |

Thermochemistry
| Heat capacity (C) | 255.68 J/(K·mol) |
| Std molar entropy (S^{⦵}_{298}) | 361.20 J/(K·mol) |
| Std enthalpy of formation (Δ_{f}H^{⦵}_{298}) | −252.1 to −248.5 kJ/mol |
| Std enthalpy of combustion (Δ_{c}H^{⦵}_{298}) | −5.53 to −5.33 MJ/mol |

Hazards
- GHS labelling
| Pictograms | (GHS02: Flammable) (GHS07: Exclamation mark) (GHS08: Health hazard) (GHS09: Environmental hazard) |
| Signal word | Danger |
| Hazard statements | H225, H304, H315, H336, H410 |
| Precautionary statements | P210, P261, P273, P301+P310, P331 |
| NFPA 704 (fire diamond) | 1 3 0 |
| Flash point | 13.0 °C (55.4 °F; 286.1 K) |
| Autoignition temperature | 220.0 °C (428.0 °F; 493.1 K) |
| Explosive limits | 0.96 – 6.5% |
- Lethal dose or concentration (LD, LC)
| LD_{Lo} (lowest published) | 428 mg/kg (mouse, intravenous) |
- NIOSH (US health exposure limits)
| PEL (Permissible) | TWA 500 ppm (2350 mg/m^{3}) |
| REL (Recommended) | TWA 75 ppm (350 mg/m^{3}) C 385 ppm (1800 mg/m^{3}) [15-minute] |
| IDLH (Immediate danger) | 1000 ppm |

Related compounds
| Related alkanes | Methane; Ethane; Propane; Butane; Pentane; Hexane; Heptane |
- Except where otherwise noted, data are given for materials in their standard state (at 25 °C [77 °F], 100 kPa). verify (what is ?) Infobox references

Octane is a hydrocarbon and also an alkane with the chemical formula C_{8}H_{18}, and the condensed structural formula CH_{3}(CH_{2})_{6}CH_{3}. Octane has many structural isomers that differ by the location of branching in the carbon chain. One of these isomers, 2,2,4-trimethylpentane (commonly called iso-octane), is used as one of the standard values in the octane rating scale.

Octane is a component of gasoline and petroleum. Under standard temperature and pressure, octane is a colorless liquid. Like other short-chained alkanes with a low molecular weight, it is volatile, flammable, and toxic. Octane is 1.2 to 2 times more toxic than heptane.

== Isomers ==
N-octane has 23 constitutional isomers. 8 of these isomers have one stereocenter; 3 of them have two stereocenters.

(3S,4S)-3,4-Dimethylhexane (top left) and (3R,4R)-3,4-Dimethylhexane (top right) are non-superimposable mirror images, so they are chiral enantiomers. (meso)-3,4-Dimethylhexane (bottom) has a superimposable mirror image, so it is an achiral meso compound.

Achiral isomers:

- 2-Methylheptane
- 4-Methylheptane
- 3-Ethylhexane
- 2,2-Dimethylhexane
- 2,5-Dimethylhexane
- (meso)-3,4-Dimethylhexane
- 3,3-Dimethylhexane
- 3-Ethyl-2-methylpentane
- 3-Ethyl-3-methylpentane
- 2,2,4-Trimethylpentane (i.e. iso-octane)
- 2,3,3-Trimethylpentane
- 2,3,4-Trimethylpentane
- 2,2,3,3-Tetramethylbutane

Chiral isomers:

- (3R)-3-Methylheptane
- (3S)-3-Methylheptane
- (3R)-2,3-Dimethylhexane
- (3S)-2,3-Dimethylhexane
- (4R)-2,4-Dimethylhexane
- (4S)-2,4-Dimethylhexane
- (3R,4R)-3,4-Dimethylhexane
- (3S,4S)-3,4-Dimethylhexane
- (3R)-2,2,3-Trimethylpentane
- (3S)-2,2,3-Trimethylpentane

== Production and use ==
In petrochemistry, octanes are not typically differentiated or purified as specific compounds. Octanes are components of particular boiling fractions.

A common route to such fractions is the alkylation reaction between iso-butane and 1-butene, which forms iso-octane.

Octane is commonly used as a solvent in paints and adhesives.

| N-octane is the octane isomer that has the longest carbon skeleton. Unlike its constitutional isomers, it has a very low knock resistance. | The octane isomer, iso-octane, is used as one of the standards for octane ratings. It has a rating of 100 by definition. | The octane isomer 2,3,3-Trimethylpentane has an octane rating exceeding 100. |
