= Hydroxyl aluminium bis(2-ethylhexanoate) =

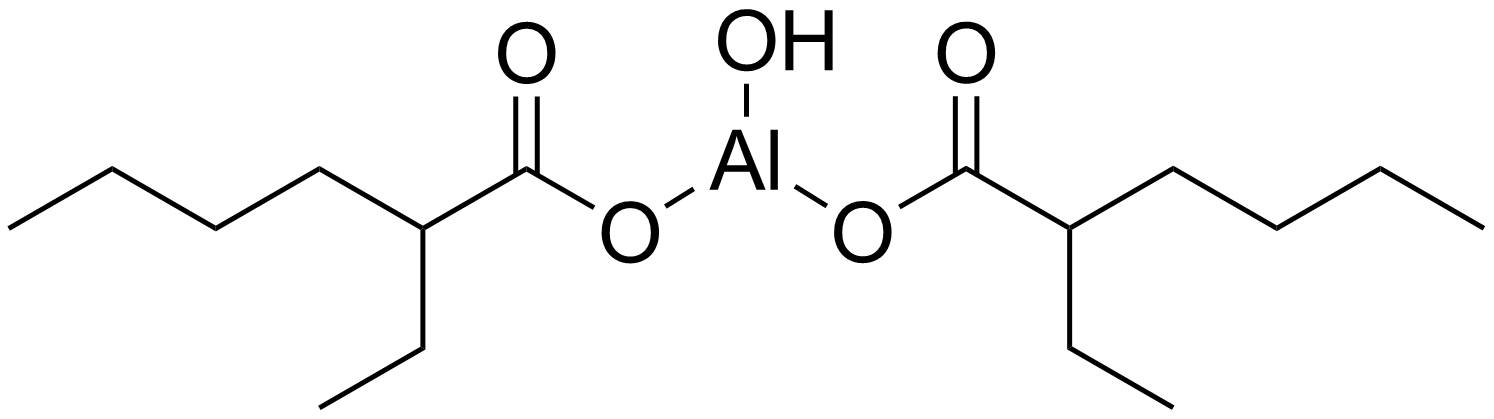

Names
- Other names Hydroxyl aluminum bis(2-ethylhexanoate); Aluminium 2-ethylhexanoate; Aluminium 2-ethylcaproate

Identifiers
CAS Number	30745-55-2
3D model (JSmol)	Interactive image
ChemSpider	21391684
ECHA InfoCard	100.045.733
EC Number	250-322-2
PubChem CID	2734950
UNII	72E28W1P5O
CompTox Dashboard (EPA)	DTXSID001014886
- InChI: InChI=1S/2C8H16O2.Al.H2O/c2*1-3-5-6-7(4-2)8(9)10;;/h2*7H,3-6H2,1-2H3,(H,9,10);;1H2/q;;+3;/p-3 Key: ITXFWNWNWXSDBB-UHFFFAOYSA-K
- SMILES: CCCCC(CC)C(=O)O[Al](O)OC(=O)C(CC)CCCC

Properties
Chemical formula	C_{16}H_{31}AlO_{5}
Molar mass	330.401 g·mol^{−1}

Hazards
- GHS labelling
Pictograms	(GHS02: Flammable) (GHS07: Exclamation mark)
Signal word	Warning
Hazard statements	H228, H315, H319
Precautionary statements	P210, P240, P241, P264, P280, P302+P352, P305+P351+P338, P321, P332+P313, P337+P313, P362, P378
- Except where otherwise noted, data are given for materials in their standard state (at 25 °C [77 °F], 100 kPa). verify (what is ?) Infobox references

Hydroxyl aluminium bis(2-ethylhexanoate) is a chemical substance derived from 2-ethylhexanoic acid and aluminium(III). Nominally it is the coordination complex with the formula Al(OH)(O_{2}CCHEt(CH_{2})_{3}CH_{3})_{2} where Et = ethyl. The composition is not a homogeneous compound. It is used as a thickening agent in various products, including in napalm. It is slightly hygroscopic.
