= Japp–Maitland condensation =

Organic chemistry reaction

The Japp–Maitland condensation is an organic reaction and a type of Aldol reaction and a tandem reaction. In a reaction between the ketone 3-pentanone and the aldehyde benzaldehyde catalyzed by base the bis Aldol adduct is formed first. The second step is a ring-closing reaction when one hydroxyl group displaces the other in a nucleophilic substitution forming an oxo-tetrahydropyran.

The reaction was first described by Francis Robert Japp and William Maitland in 1904.

The Japp–Maitland reaction is of some importance to synthetic organic chemistry for example as part of the synthesis of biomolecule centrolobine:
