= Potassium 2-ethylhexanoate =

Names
- IUPAC name Potassium 2-ethylhexanoate

Identifiers
CAS Number	3164-85-0
3D model (JSmol)	Interactive image
ChEMBL	ChEMBL3182900
ChemSpider	56266
ECHA InfoCard	100.019.660
EC Number	221-625-7
PubChem CID	23669619
UNII	P089X9A38X
CompTox Dashboard (EPA)	DTXSID4027525
- InChI: InChI=1S/C8H16O2.K/c1-3-5-6-7(4-2)8(9)10;/h7H,3-6H2,1-2H3,(H,9,10);/q;+1/p-1 Key: ZUFQCVZBBNZMKD-UHFFFAOYSA-M; InChI=1/C8H16O2.K/c1-3-5-6-7(4-2)8(9)10;/h7H,3-6H2,1-2H3,(H,9,10);/q;+1/p-1 Key: ZUFQCVZBBNZMKD-REWHXWOFAE
- SMILES: [K+].[O-]C(=O)C(CC)CCCC

Properties
Chemical formula	C_{8}H_{15}KO_{2}
Molar mass	182.304 g·mol^{−1}
Appearance	white solid

Hazards
- GHS labelling
Pictograms	(GHS05: Corrosive) (GHS07: Exclamation mark)
Signal word	Danger
Hazard statements	H315, H318, H319
Precautionary statements	P264, P264+P265, P280, P302+P352, P305+P351+P338, P305+P354+P338, P317, P321, P332+P317, P337+P317, P362+P364
- Except where otherwise noted, data are given for materials in their standard state (at 25 °C [77 °F], 100 kPa). verify (what is ?) Infobox references

Potassium ethylhexanoate is the organic compound with the formula KO_{2}CCH(C_{2}H_{5})CH_{2}CH_{2}CH_{2}CH_{3}. It is the potassium salt of 2-ethylhexanoic acid. It is a colorless solid that is soluble in a variety of organic solvents. It also forms a monohydrate.
