= 3-Methylheptane =

- Skeletal formula of 3-methylheptane

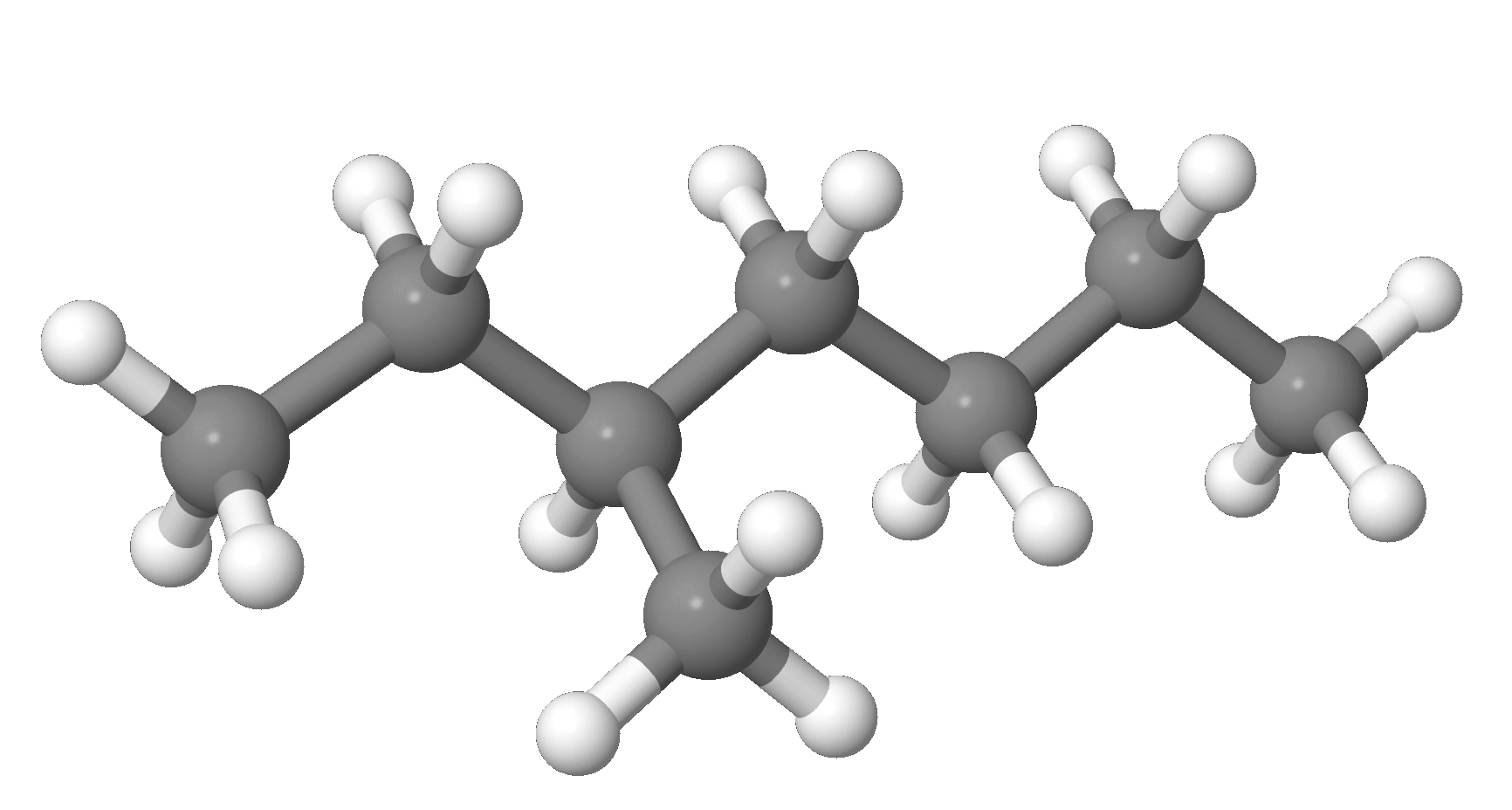
- Ball-andStick model of 3-methylheptane

Names
- Preferred IUPAC name 3-Methylheptane

Identifiers
CAS Number	589-81-1; 6131-25-5 S
3D model (JSmol)	Interactive image
Beilstein Reference	1730777
ChemSpider	11035
ECHA InfoCard	100.008.783
EC Number	209-660-6
PubChem CID	11519; 12263096 R; 12263095 S
UNII	Z4R1WI6C0R
UN number	1262
CompTox Dashboard (EPA)	DTXSID90862250
- InChI: InChI=1S/C8H18/c1-4-6-7-8(3)5-2/h8H,4-7H2,1-3H3 - Key: LAIUFBWHERIJIH-UHFFFAOYSA-N
- SMILES: CCCCC(C)CC

Properties
Chemical formula	C_{8}H_{18}
Molar mass	114.232 g·mol^{−1}
Appearance	Colourless liquid
Odor	Odourless
Density	705 mg mL^{−1}
Melting point	−122 to −120 °C; −188 to −184 °F; 151 to 153 K
Boiling point	118 to 120 °C; 244 to 248 °F; 391 to 393 K
Vapor pressure	5.0 kPa (at 37.7 °C)
Henry's law constant (k_{H})	2.7 nmol Pa^{−1} kg^{−1}
Magnetic susceptibility (χ)	−97.99·10^{−6} cm^{3}/mol
Refractive index (n_{D})	1.398–1.399

Thermochemistry
Heat capacity (C)	250.20 J K^{−1} mol^{−1}
Std molar entropy (S^{⦵}_{298})	362.6 J K^{−1} mol^{−1}
Std enthalpy of formation (Δ_{f}H^{⦵}_{298})	−253.6 – −251.4 kJ mol^{−1}
Std enthalpy of combustion (Δ_{c}H^{⦵}_{298})	−5469.5 – −5466.9 kJ mol^{−1}

Hazards
- GHS labelling
Pictograms	(GHS02: Flammable) (GHS07: Exclamation mark) (GHS08: Health hazard) (GHS09: Environmental hazard)
Signal word	Danger
Hazard statements	H225, H304, H315, H336, H410
Precautionary statements	P210, P261, P273, P301+P310, P331
Flash point	7.2 °C (45.0 °F; 280.3 K)
Explosive limits	0.98–?%

Related compounds
Related alkanes	2-Methylhexane; 3-Methylhexane; 2-Methylheptane
Related compounds	Valnoctamide; 2-Ethylhexanol; Valpromide; 2-Ethylhexanoic acid; Propylheptyl alcohol
- Except where otherwise noted, data are given for materials in their standard state (at 25 °C [77 °F], 100 kPa). verify (what is ?) Infobox references

3-Methylheptane is a branched alkane isomeric to octane. Its structural formula is CH_{3}CH_{2}CH(CH_{3})CH_{2}CH_{2}CH_{2}CH_{3}. It has one stereocenter.

Its refractive index is 1.398 (20 °C, D).
