= 2-Propylheptanol =

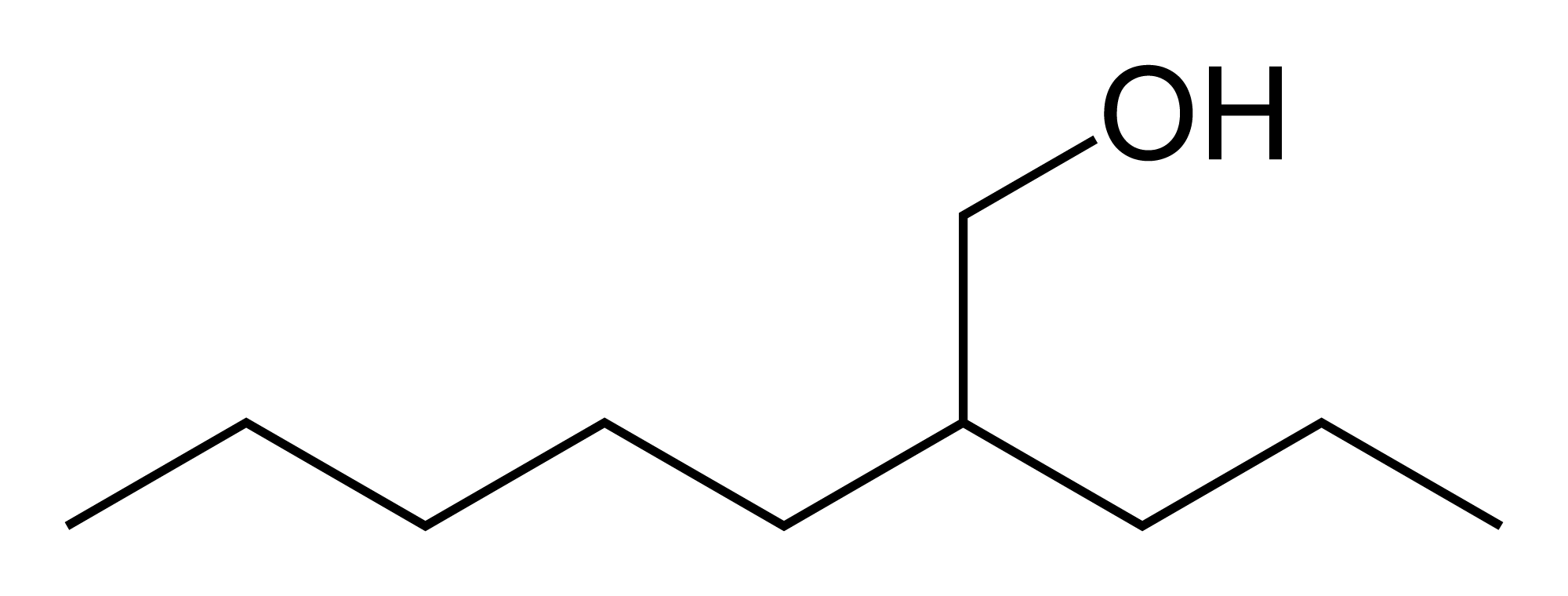
- Skeletal formula of propylheptyl alcohol

Names
- Preferred IUPAC name 2-Propylheptan-1-ol

Identifiers
CAS Number	10042-59-8
3D model (JSmol)	Interactive image
ChemSpider	23230
ECHA InfoCard	100.030.102
EC Number	233-126-1
PubChem CID	24847; 38988678 R; 38988758 S
UNII	ROZ1V94YZK
CompTox Dashboard (EPA)	DTXSID9029302
- InChI: InChI=1S/C10H22O/c1-3-5-6-8-10(9-11)7-4-2/h10-11H,3-9H2,1-2H3 Key: YLQLIQIAXYRMDL-UHFFFAOYSA-N
- SMILES: CCCCCC(CO)CCC

Properties
Chemical formula	C_{10}H_{22}O
Molar mass	158.285 g·mol^{−1}
Appearance	White, opaque, waxy crystals
Boiling point	215 °C (419 °F; 488 K)

Related compounds
Related alkanols	2-Ethylhexanol
Related compounds	Valnoctamide; 2-Methylheptane; 3-Methylheptane; Valpromide; 2-Ethylhexanoic acid
- Except where otherwise noted, data are given for materials in their standard state (at 25 °C [77 °F], 100 kPa). verify (what is ?) Infobox references

2-Propylheptanol (2PH) is a chemical compound with various industrial uses. It is a colorless, waxy solid.

== Production ==
2-Propylheptanol is an oxo alcohol, meaning that it is produced from the hydroformylation ("oxo synthesis") of C4 alkenes followed by hydrogenation of the resulting aldehyde. It can also be prepared by a production route that is similar to that for 2-ethylhexanol:

Synthesis of 2-propylheptanol from pentanal via an aldol reaction followed by catalytic hydrogenation

== Applications ==
Such compounds enjoy many applications, including as raw materials for plasticizers, resins, processing solvents, and precursors to detergents. Heat stabilizers manufactured for PVC compounds use similar high boiling and high molecular weight oxo-alcohols, which enhance product performance. A further application area of this C10 alcohol is for the manufacture of oleate- and palmitate-based materials used by the cosmetics industry. Due to its very limited solubility in water, 2PH can be used as a special solvent, with potential application in life sciences. A promising application of these alcohols would be as precursors to acrylate monomers, potentially conferring enhanced flexibility.
