= 2-Methylheptane =

- Skeletal formula of 2-methylheptane

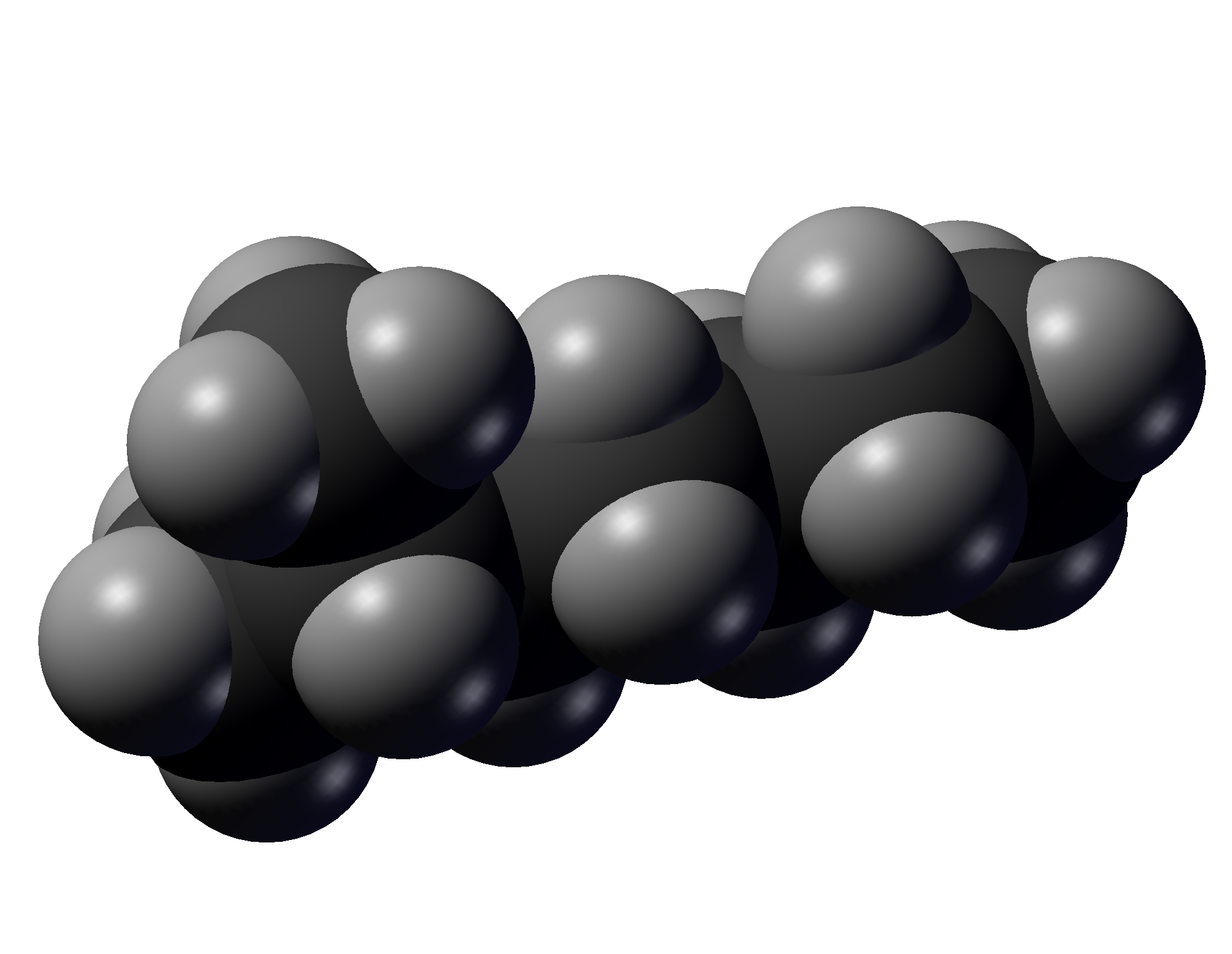
- Spacefill model of 2-methylheptane

Names
- Preferred IUPAC name 2-Methylheptane

Identifiers
CAS Number	592-27-8
3D model (JSmol)	Interactive image
Beilstein Reference	1696862
ChEBI	CHEBI:88849
ChemSpider	11106
ECHA InfoCard	100.008.863
EC Number	209-747-9
PubChem CID	11594
UNII	YU6SU8CCVB
UN number	1262
CompTox Dashboard (EPA)	DTXSID2060460
- InChI: InChI=1S/C8H18/c1-4-5-6-7-8(2)3/h8H,4-7H2,1-3H3 Key: JVSWJIKNEAIKJW-UHFFFAOYSA-N
- SMILES: CCCCCC(C)C

Properties
Chemical formula	C_{8}H_{18}
Molar mass	114.232 g·mol^{−1}
Appearance	Colourless liquid
Odor	Odourless
Density	698 mg mL^{−1}
Melting point	−112 to −108 °C; −170 to −163 °F; 161 to 165 K
Boiling point	116.8 to 118.4 °C; 242.2 to 245.0 °F; 389.9 to 391.5 K
Vapor pressure	5.3 kPa (at 37.7 °C)
Henry's law constant (k_{H})	2.7 nmol Pa^{−1} kg^{−1}
Refractive index (n_{D})	1.395–1.396

Thermochemistry
Heat capacity (C)	252.00 J K^{−1} mol^{−1}
Std molar entropy (S^{⦵}_{298})	356.39 J K^{−1} mol^{−1}
Std enthalpy of formation (Δ_{f}H^{⦵}_{298})	−256.5–−253.9 kJ mol^{−1}
Std enthalpy of combustion (Δ_{c}H^{⦵}_{298})	−5466.7–−5464.3 kJ mol^{−1}

Hazards
- GHS labelling
Pictograms	(GHS02: Flammable) (GHS07: Exclamation mark) (GHS08: Health hazard) (GHS09: Environmental hazard)
Signal word	Danger
Hazard statements	H225, H304, H315, H336, H410
Precautionary statements	P210, P261, P273, P301+P310, P331
NFPA 704 (fire diamond)	0 3 0
Flash point	4.4 °C (39.9 °F; 277.5 K)
Explosive limits	0.98–?%

Related compounds
Related alkanes	2-Methylhexane; 3-Methylhexane; 3-Methylheptane
Related compounds	Valnoctamide; 2-Ethylhexanol; Valpromide; 2-Ethylhexanoic acid; Propylheptyl alcohol
- Except where otherwise noted, data are given for materials in their standard state (at 25 °C [77 °F], 100 kPa). verify (what is ?) Infobox references

2-Methylheptane is a branched-chain alkane and an isomer of octane. It is an heptane molecule with a methyl group attached to its second atom. It is a flammable colorless liquid used as fuel.

If the standard definition of the prefix "iso-" is strictly used then 2-methylheptane can be called "Isooctane". However this name is usually used for another much more important isomer of octane 2,2,4-trimethylpentane.
