= Butyraldehyde =

Chemical compound CH3(CH2)2CHO

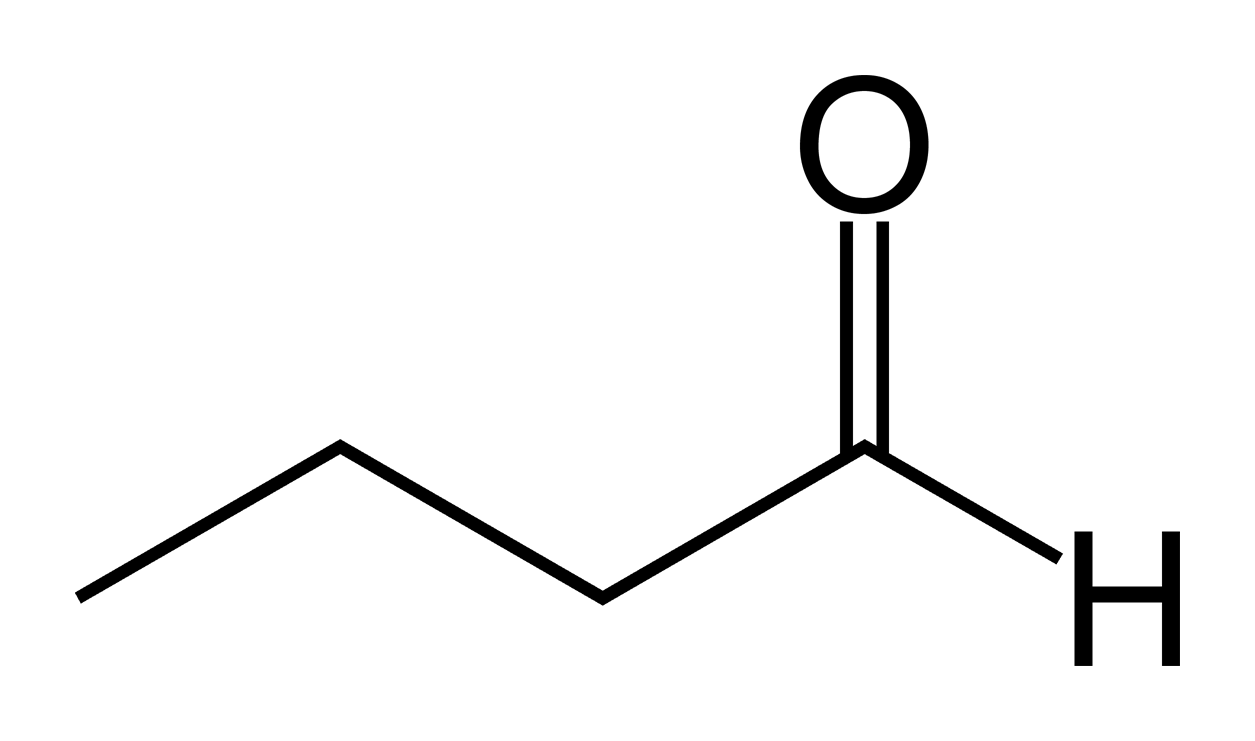
Structural formula of butyraldehyde
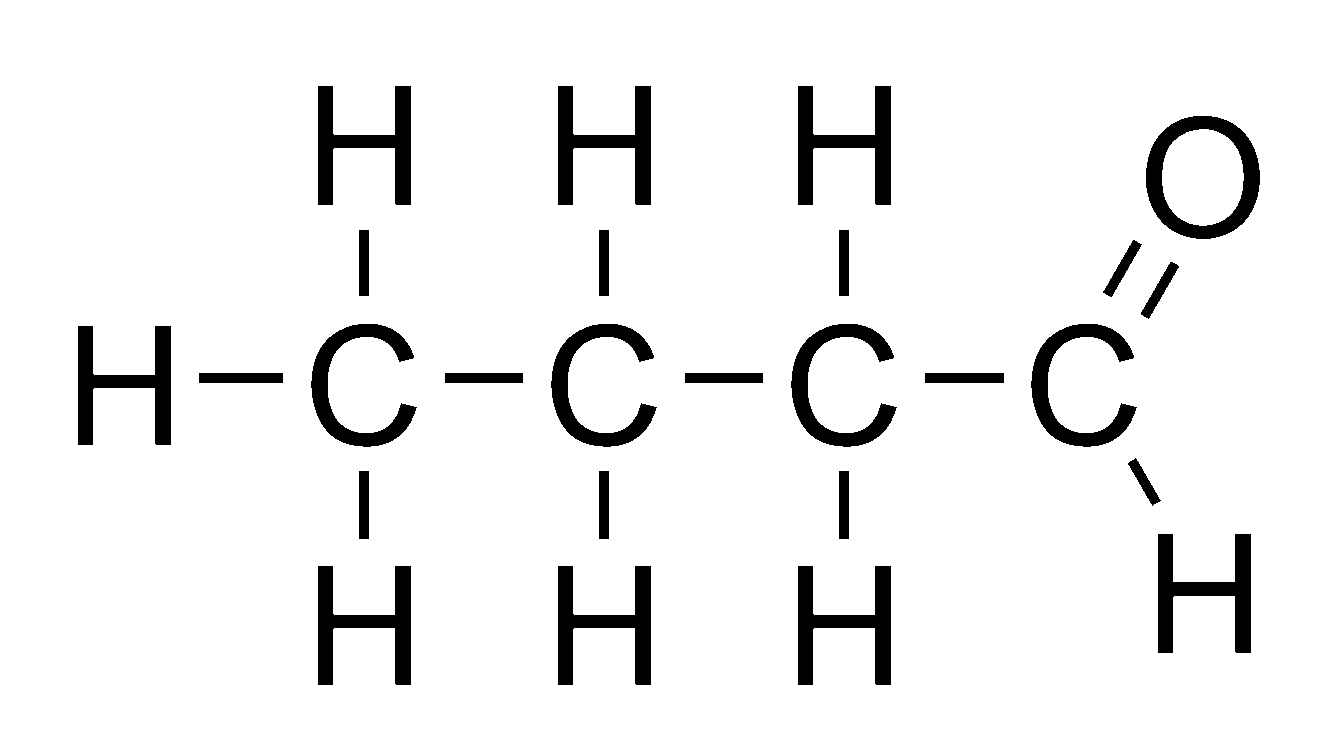
Flat structure
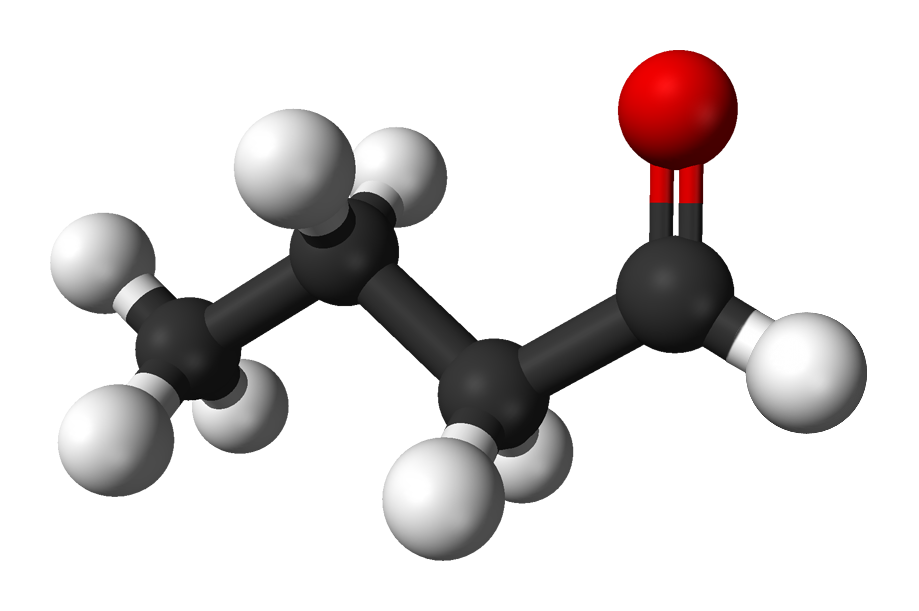
- Ball-and-stick model

Names
- Preferred IUPAC name Butanal
- Other names Butyraldehyde

Identifiers
CAS Number	123-72-8
3D model (JSmol)	Interactive image
ChEBI	CHEBI:15743
ChEMBL	ChEMBL1478334
ChemSpider	256
ECHA InfoCard	100.004.225
EC Number	204-646-6
KEGG	C01412
PubChem CID	261
RTECS number	ES2275000
UNII	H21352682A
UN number	1129
CompTox Dashboard (EPA)	DTXSID8021513
- InChI: InChI=1S/C4H8O/c1-2-3-4-5/h4H,2-3H2,1H3 Key: ZTQSAGDEMFDKMZ-UHFFFAOYSA-N; InChI=1/C4H8O/c1-2-3-4-5/h4H,2-3H2,1H3 Key: ZTQSAGDEMFDKMZ-UHFFFAOYAZ
- SMILES: O=CCCC

Properties
Chemical formula	C_{4}H_{8}O
Molar mass	72.107 g·mol^{−1}
Appearance	Colorless liquid
Odor	Pungent, aldehyde odor
Density	0.8016 g/mL
Melting point	−96.86 °C (−142.35 °F; 176.29 K)
Boiling point	74.8 °C (166.6 °F; 347.9 K)
Critical point (T, P)	537 K (264 °C), 4.32 MPa (42.6 atm)
Solubility in water	7.6 g/100 mL (20 °C)
Solubility	Miscible with organic solvents
log P	0.88
Magnetic susceptibility (χ)	−46.08·10^{−6} cm^{3}/mol
Refractive index (n_{D})	1.3766
Viscosity	0.45 cP (20 °C)
Dipole moment	2.72 D

Thermochemistry
Heat capacity (C)	163.7 J·mol^{−1}·K^{−1} (liquid); 103.4 J·mol^{−1}·K^{−1} (gas)
Std molar entropy (S^{⦵}_{298})	246.6 J·mol^{−1}·K^{−1} (liquid); 343.7 J·mol^{−1}·K^{−1} (gas)
Std enthalpy of formation (Δ_{f}H^{⦵}_{298})	−239.2 kJ·mol^{−1} (liquid) −204.8 kJ·mol^{−1} (gas)
Std enthalpy of combustion (Δ_{c}H^{⦵}_{298})	2470.34 kJ·mol^{−1}

Hazards
- GHS labelling
Pictograms	(GHS02: Flammable) (GHS07: Exclamation mark)
Signal word	Danger
Hazard statements	H225, H319
Precautionary statements	P210, P280, P302+P352, P304+P340, P305+P351+P338
NFPA 704 (fire diamond)	3 3 0
Flash point	−7 °C (19 °F; 266 K)
Autoignition temperature	230 °C (446 °F; 503 K)
Explosive limits	1.9–12.5%
- Lethal dose or concentration (LD, LC)
LD_{50} (median dose)	2490 mg/kg (rat, oral)
Safety data sheet (SDS)	Sigma-Aldrich

Related compounds
Related aldehyde	Propionaldehyde; Pentanal
Related compounds	Butan-1-ol; Butyric acid, isobutyraldehyde
- Except where otherwise noted, data are given for materials in their standard state (at 25 °C [77 °F], 100 kPa). verify (what is ?) Infobox references

Butyraldehyde, also known as butanal, is an organic compound with the formula CH_{3}(CH_{2})_{2}CHO. This compound is the aldehyde derivative of butane. It is a colorless flammable liquid with an unpleasant smell. It is miscible with most organic solvents.

== Production ==
Butyraldehyde is produced almost exclusively by the hydroformylation of propylene:

CH_{3}CH=CH_{2} + H_{2} + CO → CH_{3}CH_{2}CH_{2}CHO

Traditionally, hydroformylation was catalyzed by cobalt carbonyl but rhodium complexes are more common. The dominant technology involves the use of rhodium catalysts derived from the water-soluble ligand tppts. An aqueous solution of the rhodium catalyst converts the propylene to the aldehyde, which forms a lighter (less dense) immiscible phase. About 6 billion kilograms are produced annually in this manner. Butyraldehyde can be produced by the catalytic dehydrogenation of n-butanol. At one time, it was produced industrially by the catalytic hydrogenation of crotonaldehyde, which is derived from acetaldehyde.

== Reactions and uses ==
Butyraldehyde undergoes reactions typical of alkyl aldehydes, and these define many of the uses of this compound. Important reactions include hydrogenation to the alcohol, oxidation to the acid, and base-catalyzed condensation. In the presence of a base, two equivalents of butyraldehyde undergoe aldol condensation to give 2-ethylhexenal. This unsaturated aldehyde is then partially hydrogenated to form 2-ethylhexanal, a precursor to plasticizers such as bis(2-ethylhexyl) phthalate.

Butyraldehyde is a component in the two-step synthesis of trimethylolpropane, which is used for the production of alkyd resins.

A major use of butyraldehyde is in the production of bis(2-ethylhexyl) phthalate, a major plasticizer.
