= 2-Ethylhexanol =

- Skeletal formula of 2-ethylhexanol

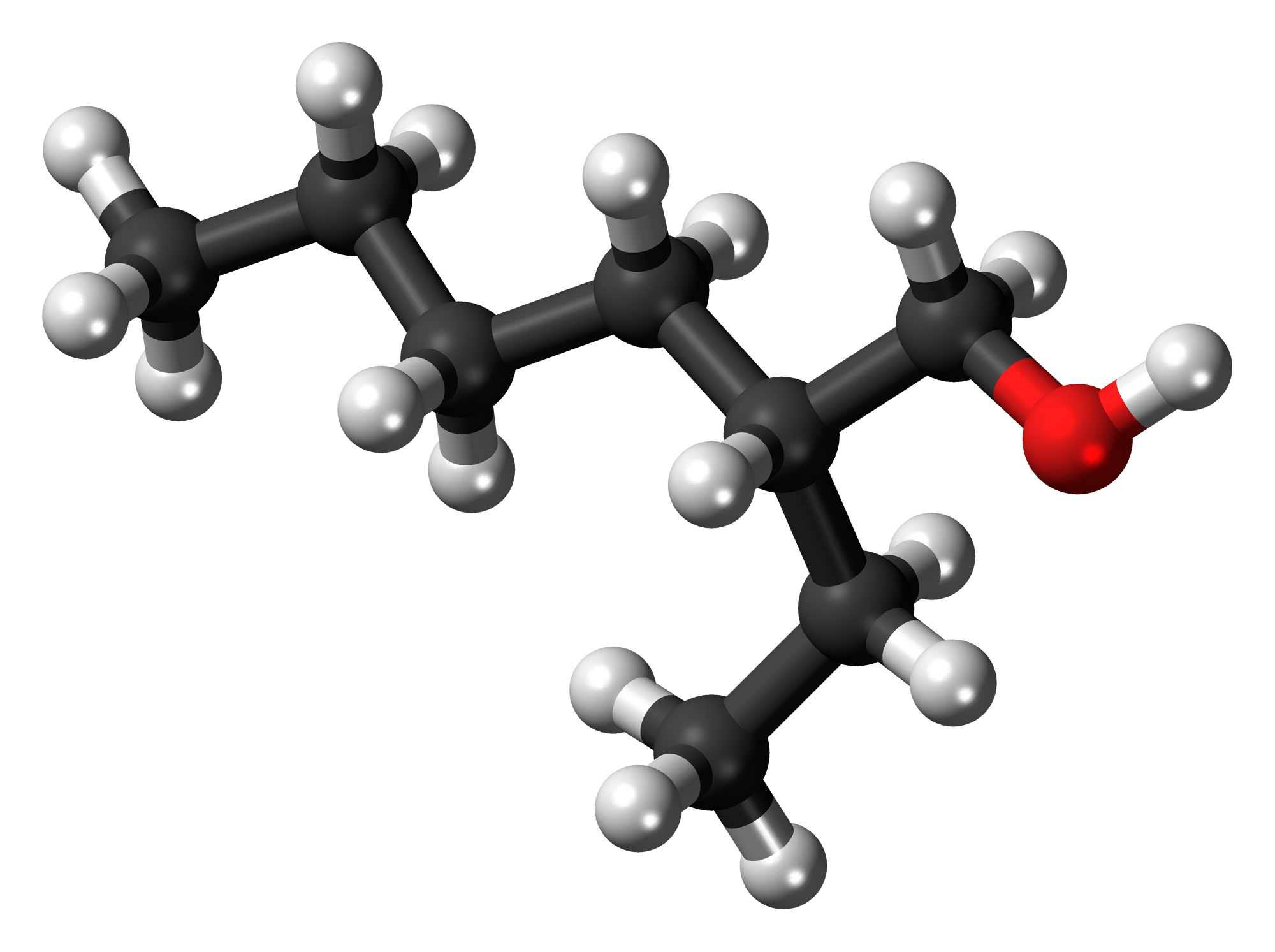

Names
- Preferred IUPAC name 2-Ethylhexan-1-ol
- Other names isooctyl alcohol, 2-ethylhexanol

Identifiers
CAS Number	104-76-7
3D model (JSmol)	Interactive image
Beilstein Reference	1719280
ChEBI	CHEBI:16011
ChEMBL	ChEMBL31637; ChEMBL1229918
ChemSpider	7434; 5360145 (R enantiomer); 5360146 (S enantiomer)
ECHA InfoCard	100.002.941
EC Number	203-234-3
KEGG	C02498
MeSH	2-ethylhexanol
PubChem CID	7720; 6991979 (R enantiomer); 6991980 (S enantiomer)
UNII	XZV7TAA77P
CompTox Dashboard (EPA)	DTXSID5020605
- InChI: InChI=1S/C8H18O/c1-3-5-6-8(4-2)7-9/h8-9H,3-7H2,1-2H3 Key: YIWUKEYIRIRTPP-UHFFFAOYSA-N
- SMILES: CCCCC(CC)CO

Properties
Chemical formula	C_{8}H_{18}O
Molar mass	130.231 g·mol^{−1}
Appearance	Colourless liquid
Density	833 mg/mL
Melting point	−76 °C (−105 °F; 197 K)
Boiling point	180 to 186 °C; 356 to 367 °F; 453 to 459 K
log P	2.721
Vapor pressure	30 Pa (at 20 °C)
Refractive index (n_{D})	1.431

Thermochemistry
Heat capacity (C)	317.5 J/(K·mol)
Std molar entropy (S^{⦵}_{298})	347.0 J/(K·mol)
Std enthalpy of formation (Δ_{f}H^{⦵}_{298})	−433.67–−432.09 kJ/mol
Std enthalpy of combustion (Δ_{c}H^{⦵}_{298})	−5.28857–−5.28699 MJ/mol

Hazards
- Occupational safety and health (OHS/OSH)
Main hazards	Mildly toxic
- GHS labelling
Pictograms	(GHS07: Exclamation mark)
Signal word	Danger
Hazard statements	H302, H312, H315, H318, H335
Precautionary statements	P261, P280, P305+P351+P338
Flash point	81 °C (178 °F; 354 K)
Autoignition temperature	290 °C (554 °F; 563 K)
Explosive limits	0.88–9.7%
- Lethal dose or concentration (LD, LC)
LD_{50} (median dose)	1.97 g/kg (dermal, rabbit); 3.73 g/kg (oral, rat)
- NIOSH (US health exposure limits)
PEL (Permissible)	none
REL (Recommended)	TWA 50 ppm (270 mg/m^{3}) (skin)
IDLH (Immediate danger)	N.D.

Related compounds
Related alkanol	Propylheptyl alcohol
Related compounds	2-Methylhexane; 3-Methylhexane; Valnoctamide; 2-Methylheptane; 3-Methylheptane; Valpromide; 2-Ethylhexanoic acid
- Except where otherwise noted, data are given for materials in their standard state (at 25 °C [77 °F], 100 kPa). verify (what is ?) Infobox references

2-Ethylhexanol (abbreviated 2-EH) is an organic compound with the chemical formula CH_{3}CH_{2}CH_{2}CH_{2}CH(CH_{2}CH_{3})CH_{2}OH. It is a branched, eight-carbon chiral alcohol. It is a colorless liquid that is poorly soluble in water but soluble in most organic solvents. It is produced on a large scale (>2,000,000,000 kg/y) for use in numerous applications such as solvents, flavors, and fragrances and especially as a precursor for production of other chemicals such as emollients and plasticizers. It is encountered in plants, fruits, and wines. The odor has been reported as "heavy, earthy, and slightly floral" for the R enantiomer and "a light, sweet floral fragrance" for the S enantiomer.

== Properties and applications ==
The branching in 2-ethylhexanol inhibits crystallization. Esters of 2-ethylhexanol are similarly affected, which together with low volatility, is the basis of applications in the production of plasticizers and lubricants, where its presence helps reduce viscosity and lower freezing points. Because 2-ethylhexanol is a fatty alcohol, its esters have emollient properties. Representative is the diester bis(2-ethylhexyl) phthalate (DEHP), commonly used in PVC. The triester tris (2-Ethylhexyl) trimellitate (TOTM) is another common plasticizer produced via the esterification of three 2-ethylhexanol per trimellitic acid.

It is also commonly used as a low volatility solvent. The nitrate ester of 2-Ethylhexanol is also used as a cetane improver for diesel fuel. It also used to react with epichlorohydrin and sodium hydroxide to produce 2-Ethylhexyl glycidyl ether which is then used as an epoxy reactive diluent in various coatings, adhesives and sealants applications. It can be used in the development of photos, production of rubber and extraction of oil and gas.

== Industrial production ==
2-Ethylhexanol is produced industrially by the hydrogenation of 2-ethylhexanal. About 2,500,000 tons are prepared in this way annually.

== Health effects ==
2-Ethylhexanol exhibits low toxicity in animal models, with LD50 ranging from 2-3 g/kg (rat). 2-Ethylhexanol has been identified as a cause of indoor air quality related health problems, such as respiratory system irritation, as a volatile organic compound. 2-Ethylhexanol is emitted to air from a PVC flooring installed on concrete that had not been dried properly.

2-Ethylhexanol has been linked to developmental toxicity (increased incidence of skeletal malformations in fetuses). This is thought to be a result of metabolism of 2-ethylhexanol into 2-ethylhexanoic acid via oxidation of the primary alcohol. The teratogenicity of 2-ethylhexanoic acid, as well as similar substances such as valproic acid, has been well established.

== Nomenclature ==
Although isooctanol (and the derived isooctyl prefix) is commonly used in industry to refer to 2-ethylhexanol and its derivatives, IUPAC naming conventions dictate that this name is properly applied to another isomer of octanol, 6-methylheptan-1-ol. The Chemical Abstracts Service likewise indexes isooctanol (CAS# 26952-21-6) as 6-methylheptan-1-ol.

== See also ==
- 2-Ethylhexanoic acid
