= List of straight-chain alkanes =

The following is a list of straight-chain alkanes, the total number of isomers of each (including branched chains), and their common names, sorted by number of carbon atoms.

Number of C atoms	Number of isomers	Number of isomers including stereoisomers	Molecular Formula	Name of straight chain	Synonyms
1	1	1	CH_{4}	methane	methyl hydride; natural gas
2	1	1	C_{2}H_{6}	ethane	dimethyl; ethyl hydride; methyl methane
3	1	1	C_{3}H_{8}	propane	dimethyl methane; propyl hydride
4	2	2	C_{4}H_{10}	n-butane	butyl hydride; methylethyl methane
5	3	3	C_{5}H_{12}	n-pentane	amyl hydride; Skellysolve A
6	5	5	C_{6}H_{14}	n-hexane	dipropyl; Gettysolve-B; hexyl hydride; Skellysolve B
7	9	11	C_{7}H_{16}	n-heptane	dipropyl methane; Gettysolve-C; heptyl hydride; Skellysolve C
8	18	24	C_{8}H_{18}	n-octane	dibutyl; octyl hydride
9	35	55	C_{9}H_{20}	n-nonane	nonyl hydride; Shellsol 140
10	75	136	C_{10}H_{22}	n-decane	decyl hydride
11	159	345	C_{11}H_{24}	n-undecane	hendecane
12	355	900	C_{12}H_{26}	n-dodecane	adakane 12; bihexyl; dihexyl; duodecane
13	802	2412	C_{13}H_{28}	n-tridecane	
14	1858	6563	C_{14}H_{30}	n-tetradecane	
15	4347	18127	C_{15}H_{32}	n-pentadecane	
16	10359	50699	C_{16}H_{34}	n-hexadecane	cetane
17	24894	143255	C_{17}H_{36}	n-heptadecane	
18	60523	408429	C_{18}H_{38}	n-octadecane	
19	148284	1173770	C_{19}H_{40}	n-nonadecane	
20	366319	3396844	C_{20}H_{42}	n-eicosane	didecyl; icosane
21	910726	9892302	C_{21}H_{44}	n-heneicosane	henicosane; uneicosane
22	2278658	28972080	C_{22}H_{46}	n-docosane	
23	5731580	85289390	C_{23}H_{48}	n-tricosane	
24	14490245	252260276	C_{24}H_{50}	n-tetracosane	
25	36797588	749329719	C_{25}H_{52}	n-pentacosane	
26	93839412	2234695030	C_{26}H_{54}	n-hexacosane	cerane
27	240215803	6688893605	C_{27}H_{56}	n-heptacosane	
28	617105614	20089296554	C_{28}H_{58}	n-octacosane	
29	1590507121	60526543480	C_{29}H_{60}	n-nonacosane	
30	4111846763	182896187256	C_{30}H_{62}	n-triacontane	
31	10660307791	554188210352	C_{31}H_{64}	n-hentriacontane	untriacontane
32	27711253769	1683557607211	C_{32}H_{66}	n-dotriacontane	dicetyl
33	72214088660	5126819371356	C_{33}H_{68}	n-tritriacontane	
34	188626236139	15647855317080	C_{34}H_{70}	n-tetratriacontane	
35	493782952902	47862049187447	C_{35}H_{72}	n-pentatriacontane	
36	1295297588128	146691564302648	C_{36}H_{74}	n-hexatriacontane	
37	3404490780161	450451875783866	C_{37}H_{76}	n-heptatriacontane	
38	8964747474595	1385724615285949	C_{38}H_{78}	n-octatriacontane	
39	23647478933969	4270217915878409	C_{39}H_{80}	n-nonatriacontane	
40	62481801147341	13180446189326135	C_{40}H_{82}	n-tetracontane	
41	165351455535782	40745751356421890	C_{41}H_{84}	n-hentetracontane	
42	438242894769226	126146261761339138	C_{42}H_{86}	n-dotetracontane	
43	1163169707886427	391089580997271932	C_{43}H_{88}	n-tritetracontane	
44	3091461011836856	1214115357550059889	C_{44}H_{90}	n-tetratetracontane	
45	8227162372221203	3773978539594435261	C_{45}H_{92}	n-pentatetracontane	
46	21921834086683418	1.17454674499017×10^{19}	C_{46}H_{94}	n-hexatetracontane	
47	58481806621987010	3.65973634249825×10^{19}	C_{47}H_{96}	n-heptatetracontane	
48	156192366474590639	1.14160680977903×10^{20}	C_{48}H_{98}	n-octatetracontane	
49	417612400765382272	3.56492605035317×10^{20}	C_{49}H_{100}	n-nonatetracontane	
50	1117743651746953270	1.11437894744930×10^{21}	C_{50}H_{102}	n-pentacontane	
51	2994664179967370611	3.48695195511947×10^{21}	C_{51}H_{104}	n-henpentacontane	
52	8031081780535296591	1.09212674104354×10^{22}	C_{52}H_{106}	n-dopentacontane	
53	2.15577719135726×10^{19}	3.42372129990732×10^{22}	C_{53}H_{108}	n-tripentacontane	
54	5.79191808731484×10^{19}	1.07425456458975×10^{23}	C_{54}H_{110}	n-tetrapentacontane	
55	1.55745431857550×10^{20}	3.37353654348452×10^{23}	C_{55}H_{112}	n-pentapentacontane	
56	4.19149571193412×10^{20}	1.06027803437626×10^{24}	C_{56}H_{114}	n-hexapentacontane	
57	1.12893957836133×10^{21}	3.33501408819192×10^{24}	C_{57}H_{116}	n-heptapentacontane	
58	3.04304357190683×10^{21}	1.04980159528436×10^{25}	C_{58}H_{118}	n-octapentacontane	
59	8.20861536686375×10^{21}	3.30702230705762×10^{25}	C_{59}H_{120}	n-nonapentacontane	
60	2.21587345357704×10^{22}	1.04250134336061×10^{26}	C_{60}H_{122}	n-hexacontane	
61	5.98580978477069×10^{22}	3.28863382009164×10^{26}	C_{61}H_{124}	n-henhexacontane	
62	1.61805725349297×10^{23}	1.03811173709570×10^{27}	C_{62}H_{126}	n-dohexacontane	
63	4.37671691526159×10^{23}	3.27908841257682×10^{27}	C_{63}H_{128}	n-trihexacontane	
64	1.18461618538531×10^{24}	1.03641522884615×10^{28}	C_{64}H_{130}	n-tetrahexacontane	
65	3.20828506618148×10^{24}	3.27776398697850×10^{28}	C_{65}H_{132}	n-pentahexacontane	
66	8.69413071202487×10^{24}	1.03723411195159×10^{29}	C_{66}H_{134}	n-hexahexacontane	
67	2.35737961344482×10^{25}	3.28415364073692×10^{29}	C_{67}H_{136}	n-heptahexacontane	
68	6.39551595273481×10^{25}	1.04042406553793×10^{30}	C_{68}H_{138}	n-octahexacontane	
69	1.73603007393950×10^{26}	3.29784745978795×10^{30}	C_{69}H_{140}	n-nonahexacontane	
70	4.71484798515330×10^{26}	1.04586901217870×10^{31}	C_{70}H_{142}	n-heptacontane	
71	1.28115131576464×10^{27}	3.31851797512264×10^{31}	C_{71}H_{144}	n-henheptacontane	
72	3.48296574914069×10^{27}	1.05347699979053×10^{32}	C_{72}H_{146}	n-doheptacontane	
73	9.47344738680449×10^{27}	3.34590848928408×10^{32}	C_{73}H_{148}	n-triheptacontane	
74	2.57793062389544×10^{28}	1.06317688936105×10^{33}	C_{74}H_{150}	n-tetraheptacontane	
75	7.01832115122141×10^{28}	3.37982367012913×10^{33}	C_{75}H_{152}	n-pentaheptacontane	
76	1.91156381393249×10^{29}	1.07491568187130×10^{34}	C_{76}H_{154}	n-hexaheptacontane	
77	5.20874195248907×10^{29}	3.42012195021483×10^{34}	C_{77}H_{156}	n-heptaheptacontane	
78	1.41990891534395×10^{30}	1.08865635628610×10^{35}	C_{78}H_{158}	n-octaheptacontane	
79	3.87228257513701×10^{30}	3.46670937556328×10^{35}	C_{79}H_{160}	n-nonaheptacontane	
80	1.05644769069467×10^{31}	1.10437611939016×10^{36}	C_{80}H_{162}	n-octacontane	
81	2.88336094362773×10^{31}	3.51953462699296×10^{36}	C_{81}H_{164}	n-henoctacontane	
82	7.87255854643910×10^{31}	1.12206499012211×10^{37}	C_{82}H_{166}	n-dooctacontane	
83	2.15027809474797×10^{32}	3.57858499756067×10^{37}	C_{83}H_{168}	n-trioctacontane	
84	5.87531723826577×10^{32}	1.14172465774427×10^{38}	C_{84}H_{170}	n-tetraoctacontane	
85	1.60591377849471×10^{33}	3.64388315587311×10^{38}	C_{85}H_{172}	n-pentaoctacontane	
86	4.39100290809332×10^{33}	1.16336756600997×10^{39}	C_{86}H_{174}	n-hexaoctacontane	
87	1.20102579077569×10^{34}	3.71548456067735×10^{39}	C_{87}H_{176}	n-heptaoctacontane	
88	3.28612955581209×10^{34}	1.18701618541837×10^{40}	C_{88}H_{178}	n-octaoctacontane	
89	8.99409590248916×10^{34}	3.79347541983580×10^{40}	C_{89}H_{180}	n-nonaoctacontane	
90	2.46245150242821×10^{35}	1.21270244338682×10^{41}	C_{90}H_{182}	n-nonacontane	
91	6.74391606297983×10^{35}	3.87797110845861×10^{41}	C_{91}H_{184}	n-hennonacontane	
92	1.84751504801261×10^{36}	1.24046728824609×10^{42}	C_{92}H_{186}	n-dononacontane	
93	5.06281811212116×10^{36}	3.96911497803001×10^{42}	C_{93}H_{188}	n-trinonacontane	
94	1.38778575295845×10^{37}	1.27036036776471×10^{43}	C_{94}H_{190}	n-tetranonacontane	
95	3.80518360708038×10^{37}	4.06707750189460×10^{43}	C_{95}H_{192}	n-pentanonacontane	
96	1.04363664561059×10^{38}	1.30243980672744×10^{44}	C_{96}H_{194}	n-hexanonacontane	
97	2.86312976836850×10^{38}	4.17205571326637×10^{44}	C_{97}H_{196}	n-heptanonacontane	
98	7.85684759853088×10^{38}	1.33677207115080×10^{45}	C_{98}H_{198}	n-octanonacontane	
99	2.15659631984508×10^{39}	4.28427290059784×10^{45}	C_{99}H_{200}	n-nonanonacontane	
100	5.92107203812581×10^{39}	1.37343190918329×10^{47}	C_{100}H_{202}	n-hectane	
101	1.62607500143337×10^{40}		C_{101}H_{204}	n-henhectane	
102	4.46670631687268×10^{40}		C_{102}H_{206}	n-dohectane	
103	1.22726610195426×10^{41}		C_{103}H_{208}	n-trihectane	
104	3.37281538963752×10^{41}		C_{104}H_{210}	n-tetrahectane	
105	9.27143441542280×10^{41}		C_{105}H_{212}	n-pentahectane	
106	2.54917652030591×10^{42}		C_{106}H_{214}	n-hexahectane	
107	7.01051065630088×10^{42}		C_{107}H_{216}	n-heptahectane	
108	1.92838773361102×10^{43}		C_{108}H_{218}	n-octahectane	
109	5.30557278101059×10^{43}		C_{109}H_{220}	n-nonahectane	
110	1.46002972524313×10^{44}		C_{110}H_{222}	n-decahectane	
111	4.01865724190509×10^{44}		C_{111}H_{224}	n-undecahectane	
112	1.10633962543222×10^{45}		C_{112}H_{226}	n-dodecahectane	
113	3.04636987596851×10^{45}		C_{113}H_{228}	n-tridecahectane	
114	8.38999942017075×10^{45}		C_{114}H_{230}	n-tetradecahectane	
115	2.31113265930118×10^{46}		C_{115}H_{232}	n-pentadecahectane	
116	6.36751554673601×10^{46}		C_{116}H_{234}	n-hexadecahectane	
117	1.75467195960063×10^{47}		C_{117}H_{236}	n-heptadecahectane	
118	4.83616671898832×10^{47}		C_{118}H_{238}	n-octadecahectane	
119	1.33316731232142×10^{48}		C_{119}H_{240}	n-nonadecahectane	
120	3.67574018395043×10^{48}		C_{120}H_{242}	n-eicosahectane	

== See also ==
- Higher alkane
- List of compounds with carbon numbers 50+
