= Rose oil =

Essential oil extracted from rose petals

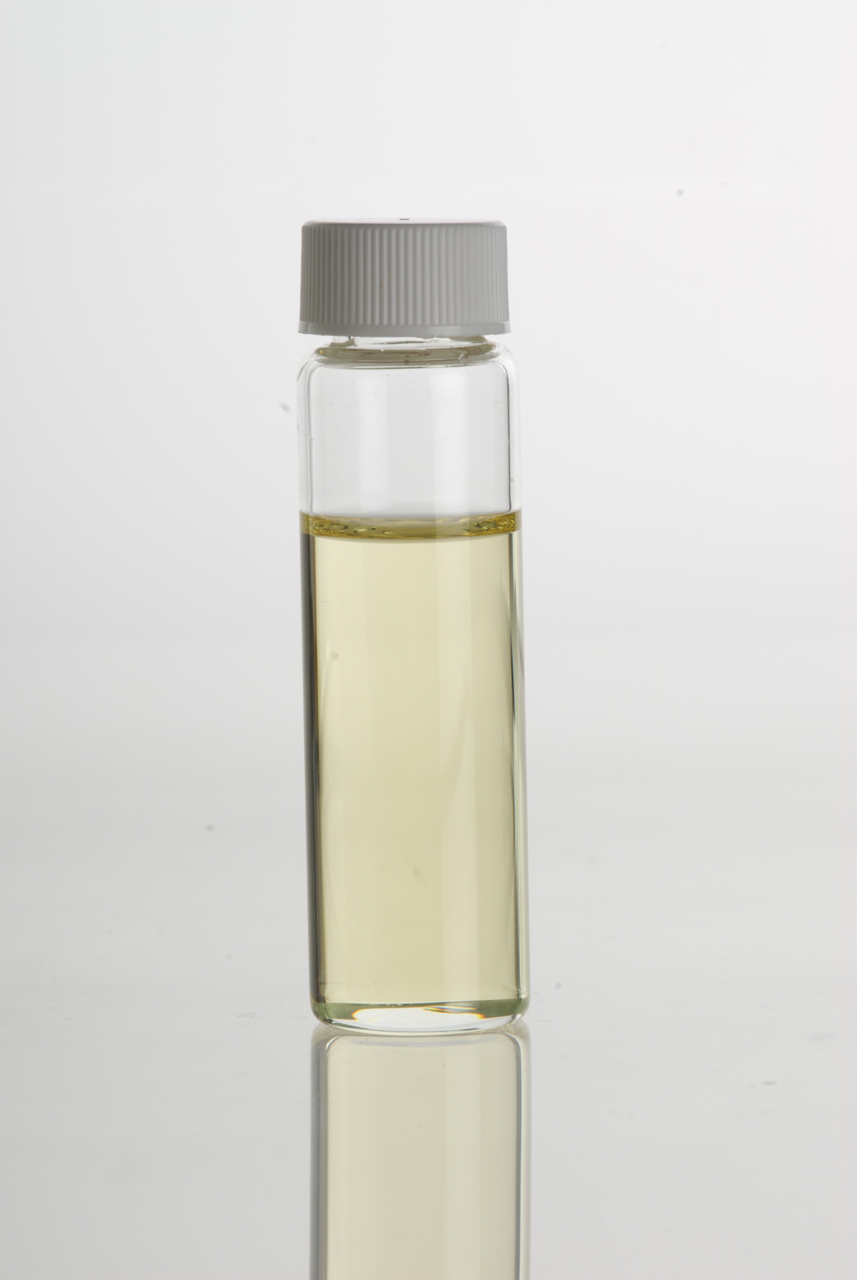
Rose (Rosa damascena) essential oil in clear glass vial

Rose oil (rose otto, attar of rose, attar of roses, or rose essence) is an essential oil that is extracted from the petals of various types of rose. Rose ottos are extracted through steam distillation, while rose absolutes are obtained through solvent extraction, the absolute being used more commonly in perfumery. The production technique originated in Iran. Even with their high price and the advent of organic synthesis, rose oils are still perhaps the most widely used essential oil in perfumery.

== R. damascena and R. centifolia ==
Two major species of rose are cultivated for the production of rose oil:

- Rosa damascena production today is dominated by 3 producers account for over 70% of the Rose oil market share:
  - Bulgaria, sold as "Bulgarian Rose"
  - Turkey, sold as "Turkish Rose"
  - Saudi Arabia, sold as "Taif Rose"
  - It is also grown on a smaller scale in Afghanistan, Armenia, Azerbaijan, Bosnia, Croatia, Cyprus, Ethiopia, Georgia, Greece, Jordan, Lebanon, India, Iran, Iraq, Israel, Moldova, North Macedonia, Oman, Serbia, Syria, Tajikistan, Turkmenistan, Pakistan, Romania, Russia, Ukraine, United Arab Emirates and Yemen.
- Rosa centifolia, the cabbage rose, which is more commonly grown in Morocco, Egypt and France.

=== Rosa damascena composition ===
Composition of rose oil and headspace vary, but the Rose international standard survey of 2003–2020 lists three components as the major components with a specific range specified in ISO 9842:2003.

==== Major rose components ====
- Citronellol 20–34%
- Geraniol 15–22%
- Nonadecane 8–15%

==== Minor rose components ====
Heneicosane, eicosane, docosane, tricosane, tetracosane, pentacosane, hexacosane, heptacosane, nonacosane, dodecane, tetradecane, pentadecane, hexadecane, heptadecane, octadecane, nerol, linalool, phenyl ethyl alcohol, farnesol, α-pinene, β-pinene, α-terpinene, limonene, p-cymene, camphene, β-caryophyllene, neral, geranyl acetate, neryl acetate, eugenol, methyl eugenol, benzaldehyde, benzyl alcohol, octane and tetradecanol.

==== Key rose components ====
- β-damascenone (0.01–1.85%)
- β-damascone (under 1%)
- other damascones (under 1%)
- beta-ionone (under 1%)
- rose oxide (under 1%)

Beta-damascenone's presence is considered as the marker for the quality of rose oil. Even though these compounds usually exist in less than 1% quantity of rose oil, they make up for slightly more than 90% of the odor content due to their low odor detection thresholds.

=== Rosa centifolia composition ===
Rosa centifolia does not have a rose oil because of the delicate nature of its petals. The Rosa centifolia absolute is composed of more than 50% phenylethyl alcohol and the rest of the composition resembles a Rosa damascena.

== Production ==
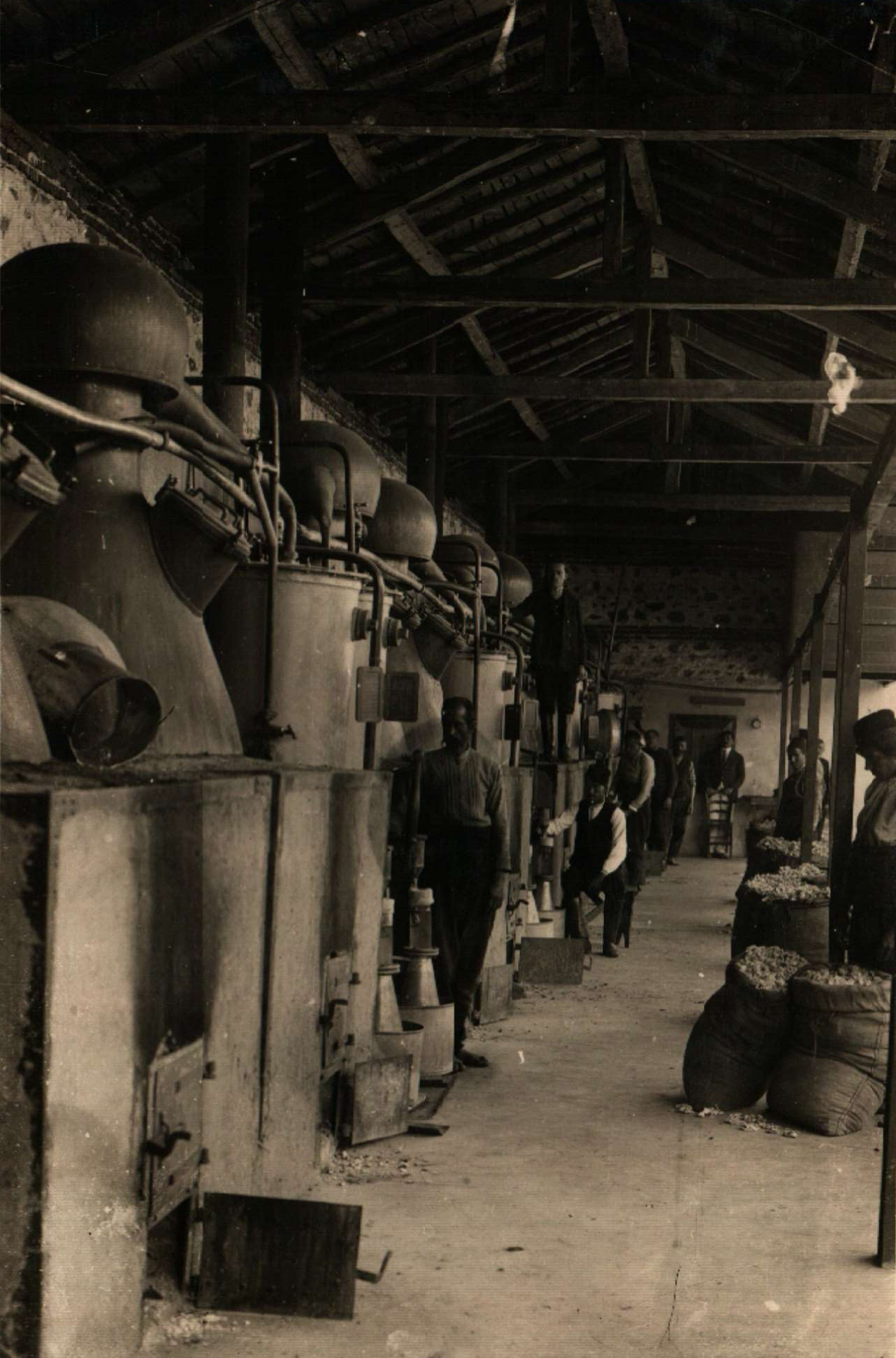
Rose oil factory in Bulgaria

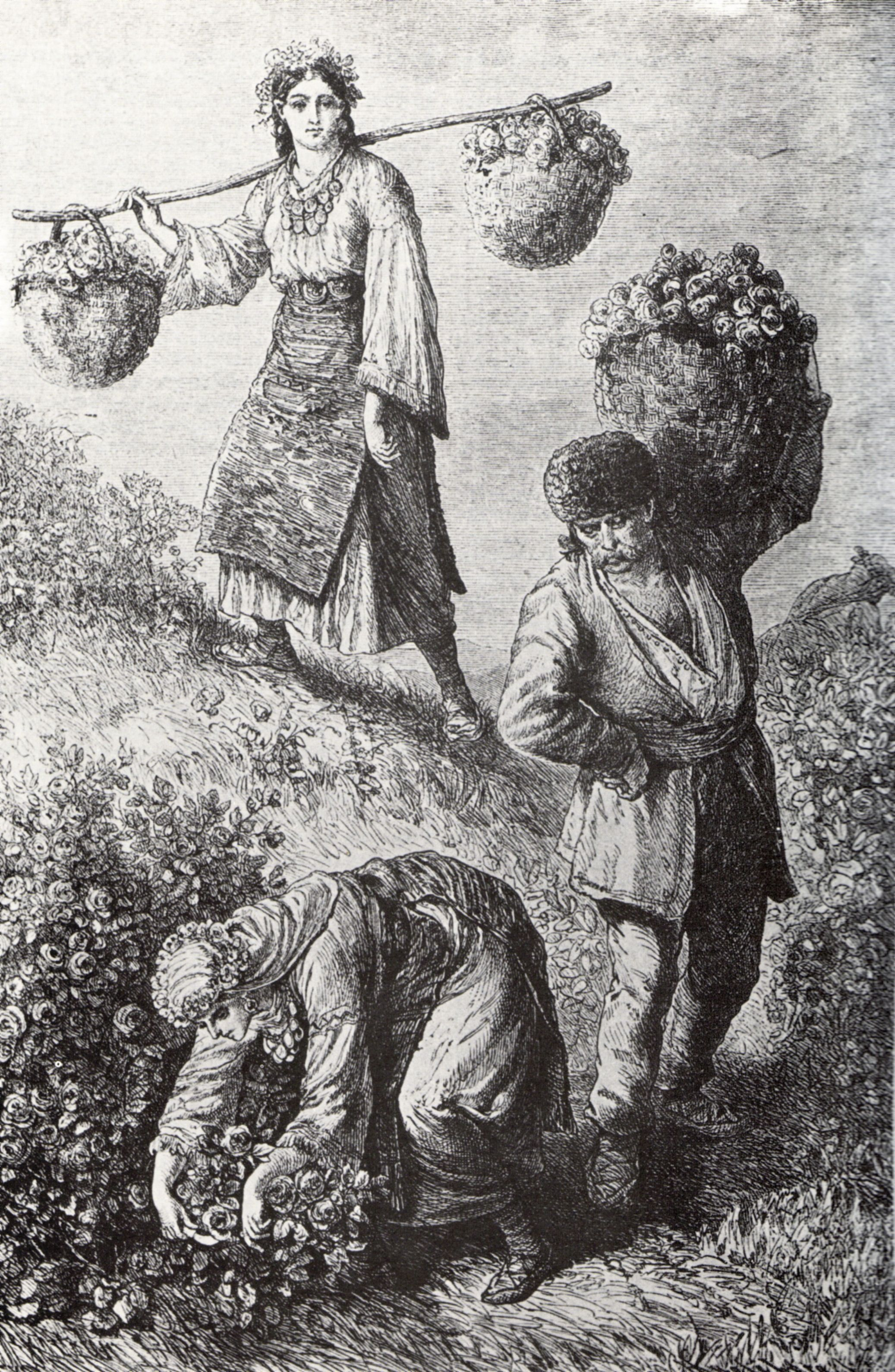
Rose-picking in the Rose Valley near the town of Kazanlak in Bulgaria, 1870s, engraving by Austro-Hungarian traveller Felix Philipp Kanitz

Due to the labor-intensive production process and the low content of oil in the rose blooms, rose oil commands a very high price. Harvesting of flowers is done by hand in the morning before sunrise, and the material is distilled the same day.

There are three main methods of extracting the oil from the plant material:

- Steam distillation, which produces an essential oil called rose otto or attar of roses.
- Solvent extraction, which results in an absolute called rose absolute.
- Supercritical carbon dioxide extraction, yielding a concrete that may be marketed as a concrete, absolute or CO_{2} extract.

=== Distillation ===
In the first part of the two-stage process of distillation, large stills – traditionally of copper – are filled with roses and water. The still is fired for 60–105 minutes. The vaporized water and rose oil exit the still and enter a condensing apparatus and are then collected in a flask. This distillation yields a very concentrated oil, direct oil, which makes up about 20% of the final product of the whole process. The water which condenses along with the oil is drained off and redistilled, cohobation, in order to obtain the water-soluble fractions of the rose oil such as phenethyl alcohol which are a vital component of the aroma and which make up the large bulk, 80%, of the oil. The two oils are combined and make the final rose attar.

Rose attar is mobile in room temperature and is usually clear, light yellow in color. It will form white crystals at normal room temperature which disappear when the oil is gently warmed. It will tend to become more viscous at lower temperatures due to this crystallization of some of its components.

The essence has a very strong odor, but is pleasant when diluted and used for perfume. Attar of roses was once made in India, Persia, Syria, and the Ottoman Empire. The Rose Valley in Bulgaria, near the town of Kazanlak, is among the major producers of attar of roses in the world. In India, Kannauj is an important city of fabrication of rose attar, Kannauj is nicknamed "The Grasse of the East" or "The Grasse of the Orient". Grasse (in France) is an important city of fabrication of rose fragrance.

Due to the heat required for distillation, some of the compounds extracted from the rose denature or break down chemically. As such, rose attar does not smell very similar to "fresh" roses.

The hydrosol portion of the distillate is known as rosewater. This inexpensive by-product is used widely as a food flavoring as well as in skin care.

=== Solvent extraction ===
In the solvent extraction method, the flowers are agitated in a vat with a solvent such as hexane, which draws out the aroma compounds as well as other soluble substances such as wax and pigments. The extract is subjected to vacuum processing which removes the solvent for re-use. The remaining waxy mass is known as a concrete. The concrete is then mixed with alcohol which dissolves the aromatic constituents, leaving behind the wax and other substances. The alcohol is low-pressure evaporated, leaving behind the finished absolute. The absolute may be further processed to remove any impurities that are still present from the solvent extraction.

Rose absolute is a deep reddish brown with no crystals. Due to the low temperatures in this process, the absolute may be more faithful to the scent of the fresh rose than the otto.

=== Carbon dioxide extraction ===
A third process, supercritical carbon dioxide extraction, combines the best aspects of the other two methods. When carbon dioxide is put under at least 72.9 atm (73.9 bar) of pressure and at a temperature of at least 31.1 °C (88.0 °F) (the critical point), it becomes a supercritical fluid with the permeation properties of a gas and the solvation properties of a liquid. (Under normal pressure CO_{2} changes directly from a solid to a gas in a process known as sublimation.) The supercritical fluid CO_{2} extracts the aromatics from the plant material.

Like solvent extraction, the CO_{2} extraction takes place at a low temperature, extracts a wide range of compounds rendering an essence more faithful to the original, and leaves the aromatics unaltered by heat. Because CO_{2} is gas at normal atmospheric pressure, it leaves no trace of itself in the final product. The equipment for CO_{2} extraction is expensive, which is reflected in the price of the essential oils obtained from the process.

=== Adulteration ===
It takes a large amount of rose petals to distill a small amount of essential oil. Depending on extraction method and plant species, the typical yield can be approximately 1:3,000. To mitigate the cost, most dealers dilute rose oil with Citronellol, Geraniol, Geranium or Palmarosa (Cymbopogon martinii) essential oils, both of which are rich in Geraniol, the main constituent of rose oil. Some of these "rose oils" are up to 90% geranium or palmarosa to 10% rose. This is referred to as extending the rose fragrance. This may be done to compensate for chemotype, e.g. Bulgarian distilled rose oil is naturally low in phenylethanol, and Ukrainian or Russian rose oil is naturally high in phenylethanol. Pure rose oil should not be used directly on the skin, as it can cause allergic reactions such as red skin and spots.

=== History ===
Rosa × damascena is a cultivated flower not found in the wild. Genetic tests indicate that it is a hybrid of R. moschata × R. gallica crossed with the pollen of Rosa fedtschenkoana, which indicates a probable origin in the foothills of central Asia or Iran. Rose oil likely originated in ancient Iran where the production technique was invented.

=== Bulgarian rose oil ===
Bulgarian rose oil is generally characterized by the following qualities:

- It differs to other rose oils in the quantitative content of its ingredients. About 283 components have been identified in the composition of Bulgarian rose oil. They are divided into two groups of substances:
  - odor carriers – represent the liquid part of the oil-eleoptene;
  - odor fixatives – hard at room temperature and odorless, but fix the odor and give it durability-stearoptene. Of the many components of eleoptene with a rosy odor are citronellol, geraniol, nerol, phenylethyl alcohol, but the typical rose odor is also formed by the presence of some characteristic molecules in trace amounts.
  - contains: ethanol (up to 3%), linalool (1 to 3%), phenethyl alcohol(up to 3%), citronellol (24 to 35%), nerol (5 to 12%), geraniol (13 to 22%), geranyl acetate (up to 1.5%), eugenol (up to 2.5%), methyl eugenol (up to 2%) and farnesol (at least 1.4%); hydrocarbons – C17 heptadecane (from 1 to 2.5%), C19 saturated hydrocarbon nonadecane CH3 (CH2) 17CH3 (from 8 to 15%), C19 unsaturated hydrocarbon with one or more double carbon bonds nonadecene CH3 (CH2) 16CH = CH2 from 2 to 5%), C21 heneicosane (from 3 to 5.5%) and C23 tricosane (from 0.5 to 1.5%).
- It has a light yellow color with a greenish tinge;
- It resembles almond oil in consistency;
- It has a strong aroma and sharp balsamic taste;
- It has an excellent combination of liquid and solid components.
