= Higher alkane =

Alkanes having nine or more carbon atoms

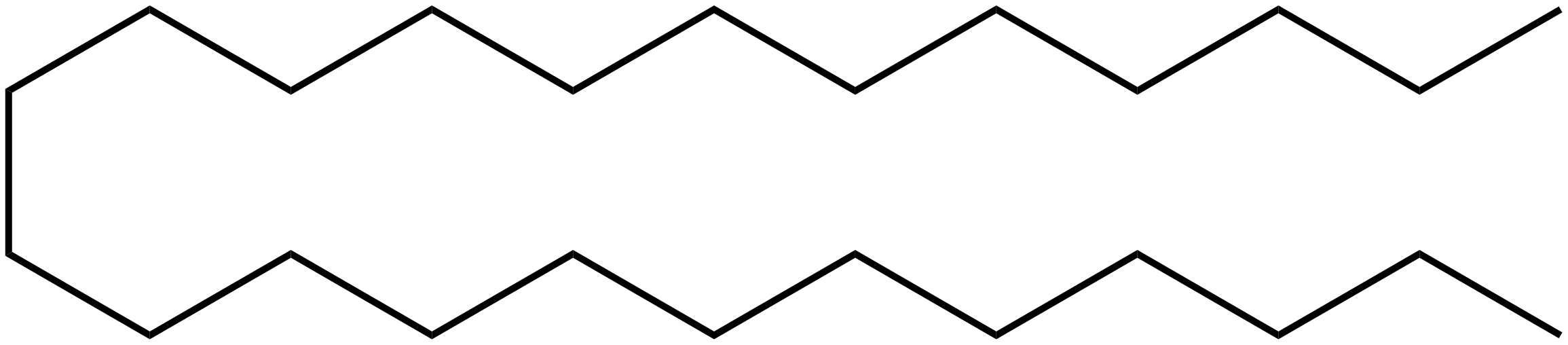
Tetracosane is a representative higher alkane

Higher alkane is the common jargon for an alkane with a high number of carbon atoms. One definition says higher alkanes are alkanes having nine or more carbon atoms. Thus, according to this definition, nonane is the lightest higher alkane. As pure substances, higher alkanes are rarely significant, but they are major components of useful lubricants and fuels.

== Synthesis ==
The preparation of specific long-chain hydrocarbons typically involves manipulations of long chain precursors or the coupling of two medium-chain components. For the first case, fatty acids can be a source of higher alkanes via decarboxylation reaction. Such processes have been investigated as a route to biodiesel.

Fatty acid esters and fatty acid nitriles react with long chain Grignard reagents to give, after suitable workup, long-chain ketones. The Wolff-Kishner Reaction provides a way to remove the ketone functionality, giving long-chain hydrocarbons.

Even-numbered, long-chain hydrocarbons can also be synthesized through electrolysis and the Wurtz reactions of alkyl bromides.

== Occurrence ==
Higher alkanes can also be isolated and purified from natural or synthetic mixtures. Coal tar is a traditional source of mixtures of long-chain hydrocarbons. Careful fractionation, first using urea clathrates to remove branched hydrocarbons, and then distillation, produces pure n-hydrocarbons from petroleum.

Regarding synthetic sources, the Fischer-Tropsch process (or FT process) produces a mixture of hydrocarbons by the hydrogenation of carbon monoxide. The products obtained are liquid hydrocarbons and waxy solids, mostly n-paraffins. The liquid fraction ranges from C_{6} to C_{20}, while the solid fraction consists of hydrocarbons above C_{21}.

=== Bioactivity ===
Some branched higher alkanes are insect pheromones. 7-methyltricosane and 9-methyltricosane are active for ladybird beetles (Adalia bipunctata). The emerald ash borer (Agrilus planipennis Fairmaire) responds to 9-methylpentacosane. Female Asian long-horned beetles Anoplophora glabripennis, which are very damaging, secrete 2-methyldocosane.

== Reactions ==
Higher alkanes in general are relatively inert, just like low molecular weight alkanes they can react with oxygen and start a combustion reaction. They can undergo cracking in the presence of alumina or silica catalysts, forming lower alkanes and alkenes.

== Uses ==
Alkanes from nonane to hexadecane (those alkanes with nine to sixteen carbon atoms) are liquids of higher viscosity, which are less suitable for use in gasoline. They form instead the major part of diesel, kerosene, and aviation fuel. Diesel fuels are characterised by their cetane number, cetane being an older name for hexadecane. However the higher melting points of these alkanes can cause problems at low temperatures and in polar regions, where the fuel becomes too thick to flow correctly. Mixtures of the normal alkanes are used as boiling point standards for simulated distillation by gas chromatography.

Alkanes from hexadecane upwards form the most important components of fuel oil and lubricating oil. In latter function they work at the same time as anti-corrosive agents, as their hydrophobic nature means that water cannot reach the metal surface. Many solid alkanes find use as paraffin wax, used for lubrication, electrical insulation, and candles. Paraffin wax should not be confused with beeswax, which consists primarily of esters.

Alkanes with a chain length of approximately 30 or more carbon atoms are found in bitumen (asphalt), used (for example) in road surfacing. However, the higher alkanes have little value and are usually split into lower alkanes by cracking.

== Names ==
Some alkanes have non-IUPAC trivial names:

- cetane, for hexadecane
- cerane, for hexacosane

== Properties ==
Nonane is the lightest alkane to have a flash point above 25 °C, and is classified as flammable under the US National Library of Medicine.

The properties listed here refer to the straight-chain alkanes (or: n-alkanes).

=== Nonane to hexadecane ===
This group of n-alkanes is generally liquid under standard conditions.

	Nonane	Decane	Undecane	Dodecane	Tridecane	Tetradecane	Pentadecane	Hexadecane
Formula	C_{9}H_{20}	C_{10}H_{22}	C_{11}H_{24}	C_{12}H_{26}	C_{13}H_{28}	C_{14}H_{30}	C_{15}H_{32}	C_{16}H_{34}
CAS number	[111-84-2]	[124-18-5]	[1120-21-4]	[112-40-3]	[629-50-5]	[629-59-4]	[629-62-9]	[544-76-3]
Molar mass (g/mol)	128.26	142.29	156.31	170.34	184.37	198.39	212.42	226.45
Melting point (°C)	−53.5	−29.7	−25.6	−9.6	−5.4	5.9	9.9	18.2
Boiling point (°C)	150.8	174.1	195.9	216.3	235.4	253.5	270.6	286.8
Density (g/ml at 20 °C)	0.71763	0.73005	0.74024	0.74869	0.75622	0.76275	0.76830	0.77344
Viscosity (cP at 20 °C)	0.7139	0.9256	1.185	1.503	1.880	2.335	2.863	3.474
Flash point (°C)	31	46	60	71	79	99	132	135
Autoignition temperature (°C)	205	210		205		235		201
Explosive limits	0.9–2.9%	0.8–2.6%					0.45–6.5%	

=== Heptadecane to tetracosane ===
From this group on, the n-alkanes are generally solid at standard conditions.

	Heptadecane	Octadecane	Nonadecane	Eicosane	Heneicosane	Docosane	Tricosane	Tetracosane
Formula	C_{17}H_{36}	C_{18}H_{38}	C_{19}H_{40}	C_{20}H_{42}	C_{21}H_{44}	C_{22}H_{46}	C_{23}H_{48}	C_{24}H_{50}
CAS number	[629-78-7]	[593-45-3]	[629-92-5]	[112-95-8]	[629-94-7]	[629-97-0]	[638-67-5]	[646-31-1]
Molar mass (g/mol)	240.47	254.50	268.53	282.55	296.58	310.61	324.63	338.66
Melting point (°C)	21	28–30	32–34	36.7	40.5	42	48–50	52
Boiling point (°C)	302	317	330	342.7	356.5	224 at 2 kPa^{a}	380	391.3
Density (g/ml)	0.777	0.777	0.786	0.7886	0.792	0.778	0.797	0.797
Flash point (°C)	148	166	168	176				

^{a}

=== Pentacosane to triacontane ===
	Pentacosane	Hexacosane	Heptacosane	Octacosane	Nonacosane	Triacontane
Formula	C_{25}H_{52}	C_{26}H_{54}	C_{27}H_{56}	C_{28}H_{58}	C_{29}H_{60}	C_{30}H_{62}
CAS number	[629-99-2]	[630-01-3]	[593-49-7]	[630-02-4]	[630-03-5]	[638-68-6]
Molar mass (g/mol)	352.69	366.71	380.74	394.77	408.80	422.82
Melting point (°C)	54	56.4	59.5	64.5	63.7	65.8
Boiling point (°C)	401	412.2	422	431.6	440.8	449.7
Density (g/ml)	0.801	0.778	0.780	0.807	0.808	0.810

=== Hentriacontane to hexatriacontane ===
	Hentriacontane	Dotriacontane	Tritriacontane	Tetratriacontane	Pentatriacontane	Hexatriacontane
Formula	C_{31}H_{64}	C_{32}H_{66}	C_{33}H_{68}	C_{34}H_{70}	C_{35}H_{72}	C_{36}H_{74}
CAS number	[630-04-6]	[544-85-4]	[630-05-7]	[14167-59-0]	[630-07-9]	[630-06-8]
Molar mass (g/mol)	436.85	450.88	464.90	478.93	492.96	506.98
Melting point (°C)	67.9	69	70–72	72.6	75	74–76
Boiling point (°C)	458	467	474	285.4 at 0.4 kPa	490	265 at 130 Pa
Density (g/ml)	0.781 at 68 °C	0.812	0.811	0.812	0.813	0.814

=== Heptatriacontane to dotetracontane ===
	Heptatriacontane	Octatriacontane	Nonatriacontane	Tetracontane	Hentetracontane	Dotetracontane
Formula	C_{37}H_{76}	C_{38}H_{78}	C_{39}H_{80}	C_{40}H_{82}	C_{41}H_{84}	C_{42}H_{86}
CAS number	[7194-84-5]	[7194-85-6]	[7194-86-7]	[4181-95-7]	[7194-87-8]	[7098-20-6]
Molar mass (g/mol)	520.99	535.03	549.05	563.08	577.11	591.13
Melting point (°C)	77	79	78	84	83	86
Boiling point (°C)	504.14	510.93	517.51	523.88	530.75	536.07
Density (g/ml)	0.815	0.816	0.817	0.817	0.818	0.819

=== Tritetracontane to octatetracontane ===
	Tritetracontane	Tetratetracontane	Pentatetracontane	Hexatetracontane	Heptatetracontane	Octatetracontane
Formula	C_{43}H_{88}	C_{44}H_{90}	C_{45}H_{92}	C_{46}H_{94}	C_{47}H_{96}	C_{48}H_{98}
CAS number	[7098-21-7]	[7098-22-8]	[7098-23-9]	[7098-24-0]	[7098-25-1]	[7098-26-2]
Molar mass (g/mol)	605.15	619.18	633.21	647.23	661.26	675.29
Boiling point (°C)	541.91	547.57	553.1	558.42	563.6	568.68
Density (g/ml)	0.82	0.82	0.821	0.822	0.822	0.823

=== Nonatetracontane to tetrapentacontane ===
	Nonatetracontane	Pentacontane	Henpentacontane	Dopentacontane	Tripentacontane	Tetrapentacontane
Formula	C_{49}H_{100}	C_{50}H_{102}	C_{51}H_{104}	C_{52}H_{106}	C_{53}H_{108}	C_{54}H_{110}
CAS number	[7098-27-3]	[6596-40-3]	[7667-76-7]	[7719-79-1]	[7719-80-4]	[5856-66-6]
Molar mass (g/mol)	689.32	703.34	717.37	731.39	745.42	759.45
Boiling point (°C)	573.6	578.4	583	587.6	592	596.38
Density (g/ml)	0.823	0.824	0.824	0.825	0.825	0.826

=== Pentapentacontane to hexacontane ===
	Pentapentacontane	Hexapentacontane	Heptapentacontane	Octapentacontane	Nonapentacontane	Hexacontane
Formula	C_{55}H_{112}	C_{56}H_{114}	C_{57}H_{116}	C_{58}H_{118}	C_{59}H_{120}	C_{60}H_{122}
CAS number	[5846-40-2]	[7719-82-6]	[5856-67-7]	[7667-78-9]	[7667-79-0]	[7667-80-3]
Molar mass (g/mol)	773.48	787.50	801.53	815.58	829.59	843.6
Boiling point (°C)	600.6	604.7	?	612.6	?	620.2
Density (g/ml)	0.826	0.826	?	0.827	?	0.827

== See also ==
- Alkene
- Alkyne
- Cycloalkane
- Hydrocarbon
- Paraffin wax, composed mostly of higher linear alkanes
- Polyethylene, a linear alkane of polymeric length
