= 2-Methyltridecane =

Chemical compound

Names
- Preferred IUPAC name 2-Methyltridecane

Identifiers
CAS Number	1560-96-9
3D model (JSmol)	Interactive image
ChEBI	CHEBI:84277
ChemSpider	14534
PubChem CID	15269
UNII	6UNR6OUH0J
CompTox Dashboard (EPA)	DTXSID30166027
- InChI: InChI=1S/C14H30/c1-4-5-6-7-8-9-10-11-12-13-14(2)3/h14H,4-13H2,1-3H3 Key: CJBFZKZYIPBBTO-UHFFFAOYSA-N
- SMILES: CC(C)CCCCCCCCCCC

Properties
Chemical formula	C_{14}H_{30}
Molar mass	198.394 g·mol^{−1}
Melting point	−21 °C (252 K)
Boiling point	121.5 °C (394.6 K)（12 Torr）
- Except where otherwise noted, data are given for materials in their standard state (at 25 °C [77 °F], 100 kPa). Infobox references

2-Methyltridecane is an organic compound with chemical formula C_{14}H_{30}. It is an isomer of tetradecane. It can be produced by reducing 2,2-dimethyl-3-decylthiirane. Metallic lanthanum in tetrahydrofuran can reduce 2-iodo-2-methyltridecane into 2-methyltridecane. In this reaction, the byproducts include 12,12,13,13-tetramethyltetracosane and some alkenes. Adding hydrogen to 13-bromo-2-methyldecan-2-ol can produce some 2-methyltridecane. This reaction is catalyzed by Raney nickel.
