= C18H38 =

The molecular formula C_{18}H_{38} (molar mass: 254.494 g/mol) may refer to:

- Octadecane, an alkane hydrocarbon with the chemical formula CH_{3}(CH_{2})_{16}CH_{3}
- 2,3,4,5,6,7,8,9-Octamethyldecane, a saturated alkane
