= C19H40 =

The molecular formula C_{19}H_{40} (molar mass: 268.51 g/mol, exact mass: 268.3130 u) may refer to:

- Nonadecane, an alkane hydrocarbon with the chemical formula CH_{3}(CH_{2})_{17}CH_{3}
- Pristane, a natural saturated terpenoid alkane
