= Evenkite =

Hydrocarbon mineral

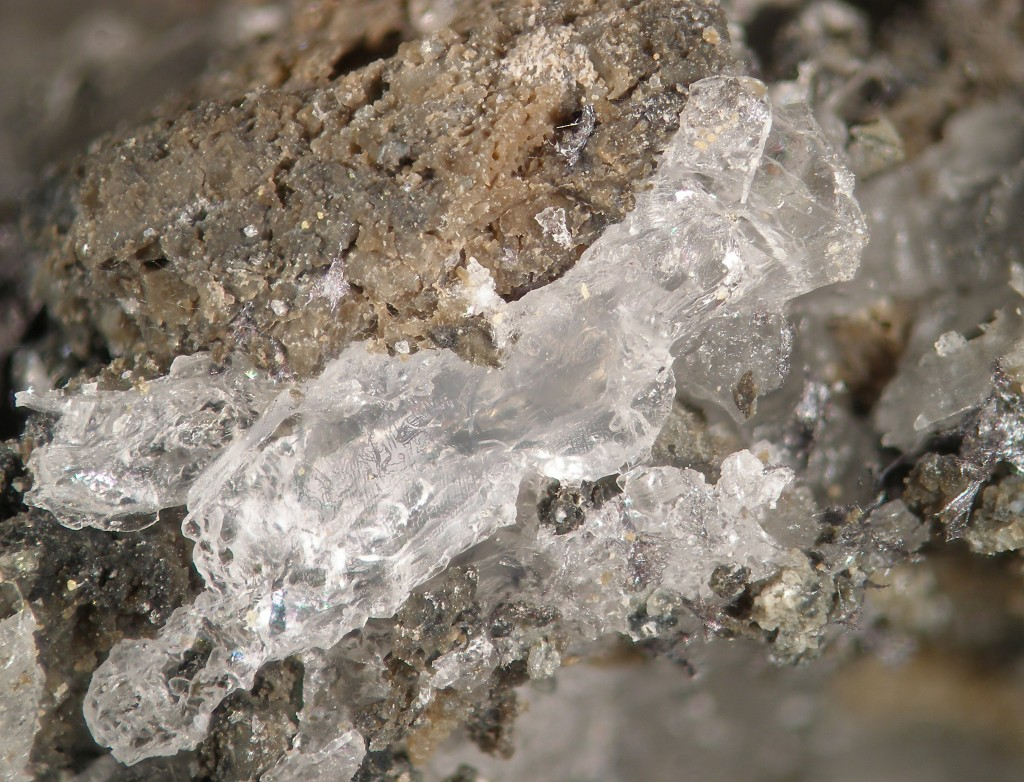
- Evenkite from Dubnik, Slovakia

General
- Category: Organic mineral
- Formula: C_{24}H_{50}
- IMA symbol: Evk
- Strunz classification: 10.BA.50
- Crystal system: Orthorhombic
- Crystal class: Dipyramidal (mmm); H-M symbol: (2/m 2/m 2/m)
- Space group: Pbcm
- Unit cell: a = 7.47, b = 4.98, c = 65.85 [Å]; Z = 4

Identification
- Color: Colorless or pale yellow
- Crystal habit: Tabular pseudohexagonal crystals, granular, disseminated
- Twinning: Polysynthetic
- Cleavage: {001} Perfect
- Mohs scale hardness: 1
- Luster: Waxy
- Diaphaneity: Transparent
- Specific gravity: 0.87
- Optical properties: Biaxial (+)
- Refractive index: n_{α} = 1.504 n_{β} = 1.504 n_{γ} = 1.553
- Birefringence: δ = 0.049

Evenkite is a rare hydrocarbon mineral with formula C_{24}H_{50}; specifically, H_{3}C–(CH_{2})_{22}–CH_{3}, the alkane n-tetracosane. It occurs as very soft (Mohs hardness 1) transparent crystals, colorless to yellow, with a waxy luster. The softness is a characteristic of crystalline long-chain alkanes, which are the main constituents of paraffin wax.

Evenkite one of very few minerals that consist of crystalline hydrocarbons, which include carpathite (pure crystalline coronene, a polyaromatic hydrocarbon). It is also one of the few non-porous minerals that floats on water. It has been claimed to be the same as hatchettite.

== History and geologic occurrence ==
Evenkite was first described in 1953 by A. V. Shropyshev, as found in the Khavokiperskiye deposit, Lower Tunguska River, Evenkiysky District, Siberia, Russia, where it occurs inside geodes and vugs in a quartz vein in welded tuff. It was named after the district. It has also been reported from the Hautes-Alpes region in France and the Slanské and Vihorlat mountains of Slovakia.

Evenkite appears as flaky wax partials on top of the quartz crystals. Associated minerals include quartz, chalcedony, pyrite, pyrrhotite, sphalerite, galena, chalcopyrite and calcite.

Evenkite was the last part of the geode to form. It is believed to have resulted from thermal cracking of the organic matter (mainly marine plants) that where trapped in the septarian concretions during the Jurassic burial, as the buried sediments were subjected to high pressure and temperatures. The French Alps region received a lot of geological uplift after the Jurassic burial.

== See also ==
- Ozokerite
- Mellite
