= Methyl butyrate =

- Methyl butanoate

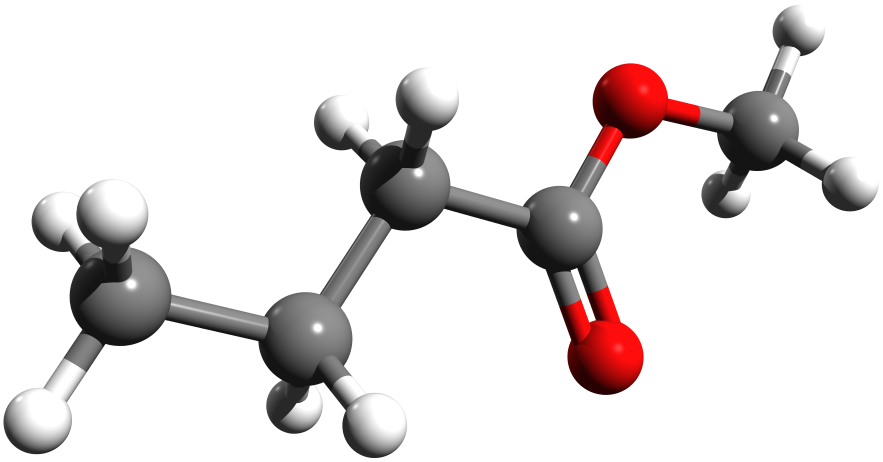
- Ball-and-stick model

Names
- Preferred IUPAC name Methyl butanoate
- Other names Butanoic acid methyl ester Methyl butyrate Butyric acid methyl ester

Identifiers
CAS Number	623-42-7
3D model (JSmol)	Interactive image
ChemSpider	11680
ECHA InfoCard	100.009.812
EC Number	210-792-1
MeSH	C043811
PubChem CID	12180
RTECS number	ET5500000
UNII	CGX598508O
CompTox Dashboard (EPA)	DTXSID5047083
- InChI: InChI=1S/C5H10O2/c1-3-4-5(6)7-2/h3-4H2,1-2H3 Key: UUIQMZJEGPQKFD-UHFFFAOYSA-N; InChI=1/C5H10O2/c1-3-4-5(6)7-2/h3-4H2,1-2H3 Key: UUIQMZJEGPQKFD-UHFFFAOYAW
- SMILES: CCCC(=O)OC

Properties
Chemical formula	C_{5}H_{10}O_{2}
Molar mass	102.133 g·mol^{−1}
Appearance	Colorless liquid
Density	0.898 g/cm^{3}
Melting point	−95 °C (−139 °F; 178 K)
Boiling point	102 °C (216 °F; 375 K)
Solubility in water	1.5 g/100 mL (22 °C)
Magnetic susceptibility (χ)	−66.4×10^{−6} cm^{3}/mol
Refractive index (n_{D})	1.386

Hazards
NFPA 704 (fire diamond)	1 3
Flash point	12 °C (54 °F; 285 K)
- Except where otherwise noted, data are given for materials in their standard state (at 25 °C [77 °F], 100 kPa). verify (what is ?) Infobox references

Methyl butyrate, also known under the systematic name methyl butanoate, is the methyl ester of butyric acid. Like most esters, it has a fruity odor, in this case resembling apples or pineapples. At room temperature, it is a colorless liquid with low solubility in water, upon which it floats to form an oily layer. Although it is flammable, it has a relatively low vapor pressure (40 mmHg at 30 °C (86 °F)), so it can be safely handled at room temperature without special safety precautions.

Methyl butyrate is present in small amounts in several plant products, especially pineapple oil. It can be produced by distillation from essential oils of vegetable origin, but is also manufactured on a small scale for use in perfumes and as a food flavoring.

Methyl butyrate has been used in combustion studies as a surrogate fuel for the larger fatty acid methyl esters found in biodiesel. However, studies have shown that, due to its short-chain length, methyl butyrate does not reproduce well the negative temperature coefficient (NTC) behaviour and early CO_{2} formation characteristics of real biodiesel fuels. Therefore, methyl butyrate is not a suitable surrogate fuel for biodiesel combustion studies.
