= Hatchettite =

Organic mineral

General
- Category: Organic minerals

Identification
- Color: Yellow-white
- Ultraviolet fluorescence: Bright lime green

Hatchettite (also mountain tallow, mineral tallow, mineral adipocire, or adipocerite) is a mineral hydrocarbon and paraffin wax. It has been claimed to be the same as evenkite. J.J. Conybeare first described hatchettite in the Merthyr Tydfil district in 1821. It was named hatchettine by J.F.W. Johnson, after Charles Hatchett, and the name was later changed to hatchettite by Dana in 1938.

== Characteristics ==
Hatchettite occurs in the coal measures of Belgium and elsewhere, occupying in some cases the interior of hollow concretions of iron-ore, but more generally the cavities of fossil shells or crevices in the rocks. It is of yellow colour, and translucent, but darkens and becomes opaque on exposure. It has no odour, is greasy to the touch, and has a slightly glistening lustre. Its hardness is that of soft wax. The melting point is 46 to 47 °C, and the composition is C 85.55 %, H 14.45 %.

== See also ==
- Ozokerite
