= Urea adducts =

Urea can crystallise with other compounds. These can be called urea adducts or if a solvent is involved, a urea solvate, and the process is called urea extraction crystallization. Urea can also be a neutral ligand if it is coordinated to a central metal atom. Urea can form hydrogen bonds to other oxygen and nitrogen atoms in the substance it crystallises with. This stiffens the solid and raises the melting point.

== List ==
name	formula	ratio urea: solute	crystal system	space group	unit cell	volume	density	comment	reference
hydrogen peroxide; urea (1:1)	HOOH•CH_{4}N_{2}O	1:1	orthorhombic	Pnca	a 6.732 b 4.8207 c 12.873 Z=4			decomposes slowly at room temperature	
urea; acetic acid (1:2)	2CH_{3}COOH•CH_{4}N_{2}O	1:2	monoclinic	P2_{1}/n	a 7.6549 b 10.1351 c 11.5219 β 99.570° Z=4	881.47	1.358	unstable in air	
oxalic acid; urea (1:1)	C_{2}H_{2}O_{4}•CH_{4}N_{2}O	1:1	monoclinic	C2/c	a 13.0625 b 6.6437 c 6.8478 β 92.474°				
oxalic acid; urea (1:2)	C_{2}H_{2}O_{4}•2CH_{4}N_{2}O	2:1	monoclinic	P2/c	a 5.058 b 12.400 c 6.964 β 98.13°				
Urea - N,N-dimethylformamide (3:1)	3CH_{4}N_{2}O·C_{3}H_{7}NO	3:1	triclinic	P1̅	a = 7.525 b = 9.866 c = 10.821 α = 65.61° β = 79.43° γ = 70.76° Z=2	689.7	1.219	colourless @150K	
N,N-dimethylacetamide; urea (1:1)	C_{4}H_{9}NO·CH_{4}N_{2}O	1:1	monoclinic	C2/c	a = 7.2770 b = 17.5394 c = 7.3789 β = 119.450° Z=4	820.11	1.192	colourless @120K	
Urea malonic acid		1:1	monoclinic	P2/c	a 13.091 b 5.455 c 9.933 β 104.39°				
Maleic acid; urea (1:1)		1:1	monoclinic	Cc	a 5.144 b 9.999 c 14.80 β 95.1°				
Succinic acid bis urea		2:1	monoclinic	P2_{1}/c	a 5.637 b 8.243 c 12.262 β 96.75° Z=2	565.81	1.41		
Maleic acid; urea (2:1)		2:1	monoclinic	P2_{1}/n	a 5.661 b 11.754 c 19.173 β 91.56°				
Fumaric acid; urea (1:2)		1:2	monoclinic	P2_{1}/c	a 5.540 b 8.227 c 12.426 β 97.22°				
D-Tartaric		1:1	orthorhombic	P2_{1}2_{1}2_{1}	a 17.229 b 9.824 c 5.056 Z=4		1.63	transparent 255 to 1370 nm; SHG 3×KDP	
DL-Tartaric		1:1	monoclinic	P2_{1}	a 7.6973 b 23.3310 c 4.8727 β 100.82°			NLO; transparent from 240 to 1950 nm	
Gluatric acid bis urea		2:1	monoclinic	C2/c	a 11.954 b 10.932 c 9.078 β 97.86° Z=4				
Itaconic acid		1:1	monoclinic	P2_{1}/c	a 12.71 b 5.2695 c 13.833β 104.78°				
2-bromotetradecane urea			hexagonal	P6_{1}22	a=8.2582 c=10.9937			298K	
2-bromotetradecane urea			orthorhombic	C222_{1}				207K	
2-bromotetradecane urea			monoclinic	P2_{1}	a 16.338(1)Å b 10.9665(8)Å c 16.338(1)Å, α 90° β 60.00°				
4-amino benzoic acid; urea (2:1)	(C_{7}H_{7}NO_{2})_{2}(CH_{4}N_{2}O)	1:2	orthorhombic	Pnab	a=7.4159 b=11.870 c=18.750				
salicylic acid; urea (1:1)		1:1	monoclinic	C2/c	a=22.206 b=5.108 c=17.177 β=106.18 Z=8°		1.407		
5-nitro salicylic acid; urea (2:1)	(C_{7}H_{5}NO_{5})_{2}(CH_{4}N_{2}O)	1:2	triclinic	P1̅	a=6.9889 b=12.1968 c=12.3622 α=60.923° β=81.169° γ=76.938°				
3,5-dinitro salicylic acid; urea (1:1)	(C_{7}H_{4}N_{2}O_{7})(CH_{4}N_{2}O)	1:1	monoclinic	P2_{1}/c	a=4.942 b=22.337 c=10.389 β=100.92°				
o-phthalic acid; urea (1:1)		1:1	triclinic	P1̅	a=7.422 b=7.662 c=10.088 α=85.95° β=82.01° γ=65.14°				
urea : 1,4-dioxane (1 : 1)	C_{4}H_{8}O_{2}•C_{3}H_{6}O	1:1	monoclinic	P2/c	a=6.7949 b=4.5234 c=12.2711 β=95.701° Z=2				
urea : morpholine (1 : 1)	C_{4}H_{8}ON•C_{3}H_{6}O	1:1	orthorhombic	Pbcm	a=4.5847 b=19.131 c=8.9047 Z=4				
3,5-dimethylpyridine bis(urea)	(CH_{3})_{2}C_{5}H_{3}N•2C_{3}H_{6}O	2:1	orthorhombic	Abm2	a=21.737 b=7.2102 c=15.590 Z=8	2443.4	1.236	at 173K	
3,5-dimethylpyridine bis(urea)	(CH_{3})_{2}C_{5}H_{3}N•2C_{3}H_{6}O	2:1	monoclinic	Cc	a=8.5829 b=21.4843 c=7.2050 β=114.405° Z=4	1209.87	1.248	at 100K	
2,6-dimethylpyridine urea	(CH_{3})_{2}C_{5}H_{3}N•C_{3}H_{6}O	1:1	triclinic	P1̅	a=7.4126 b=7.6720 c=8.1731 α=88.391° β=83.564° γ=80.059° Z=2	454.92	1.221	at 100K	
urea 2,6-dimethylpyridine	(CH_{3})_{2}C_{5}H_{3}N•C_{3}H_{6}O	1:1	monoclinic	C2/c	a=1.426 b=11.1168 c=7.4318 β=101.23° Z=4	925.9	1.200	at 200K	
2,6-dimethylpyridine bis(urea)	(CH_{3})_{2}C_{5}H_{3}N•2C_{3}H_{6}O	2:1	orthorhombic	Pnma	a=8.0772 b=7.2986 c=20.4169 Z=4	1203.64	1.254	at 100K	
2,6-dimethylpyridine bis(urea)	(CH_{3})_{2}C_{5}H_{3}N•2C_{3}H_{6}O	2:1	monoclinic	C2/c	a=11.160 b=11.5421 c=10.910 β=116.12°				
2-picoline; urea (1:1)	C_{6}H_{7}N·CH_{4}N_{2}O	1:1	orthorhombic	Pbca	a = 7.471 b = 14.916 c = 15.338 Z = 8	1709.2			
Urea pyrazine-2,3-dicarboxylic acid		1:1	monoclinic	P2_{1}/n	a=7.725 b=10.2530 c=12.612 β=97.997°				
bipyridine urea			triclinic	P1̅	a=7.200 b=8.297 c=9.835 α=75.849° β=70.744° γ =73.045°				
bipyridine urea			triclinic	P1̅	a=7.2862 b=8.3747 c=9.8647 α=76.061° β=72.789° γ=74.121°				
1,10-Phenanthroline urea		1:1	monoclinic	C2/c	a=14.342 b=12.002 c=7.3724 β 116.743°				
2,9-Dimethyl-1,10-phenanthroline urea		1:1	orthorhombic	Cmcm	a=11.370 b=17.351 c=7.3593				
sodium chloride; urea; water (1:1:1)	NaCl·CH_{4}N_{2}O·H_{2}O	1:1	triclinic		a = 6.44 Å, b = 5.245Å, c = 17.312 Å, and a=90°, β=90.15°, γ=90°	588.76		SHG 1.53 × KDP, birefringence 0.084@1064 nm UV edge 209 nm	
Bis(_{2}-3-isopropyl-7-oxocyclohepta-1,3,5-trien-1-olato)bis[(3-isopropyl-7-oxocyclohepta-1,3,5-trien-1-olato)copper(II)]-urea-acetone (1/6/2)	[Cu_{2}(C_{10}H_{11}O_{2})_{4}]·6CH_{4}N_{2}O·2C_{3}H_{6}O	5:1	monoclinic	P2_{1}/c	a 17.0125 b 11.0470 c 17.2731 β 110.385° Z=2	3042.95	1.371	green	
aqua(N-salicylidene-rac-alaninato- O,N,O')copper(II)-urea (1/1)		1:1	triclinic	P1̅	a = 7.637, b = 8.509 c = 10.716 α = 93.10° β = 97.97° γ= 106.37° Z= 2,	658.5		blue	
Aqua[9-(1,8-diazafluoren-9-ylidene)amino-1,8-diazafluorenato]hydroxo(urea)zinc(II) urea solvate	[Zn(C_{22}H_{12}N_{5})(OH)(CH_{4}N_{2}O)(H_{2}O)]•C_{4}N_{2}O	1:1	monoclinic	P2_{1}/c	a 7.8637 b 16.0133 c 17.9513 β 101.358° Z=4	2216.2	1.687	purple	
Pentakis(carbamide)dioxoneptunium(V) nitrate	[NpO_{2}{OC(NH_{2})_{2}}_{5}](NO_{3})		monoclinic	P2_{1}	a = 11.142, b = 7.6379 c = 11.143 β = 108.9° Z = 2	897.1			
Bis[(isothiocyanato)tetraureadioxoneptunium(V)] urea	{NpO_{2}(NCS)[OC(NH_{2})_{2}]_{4}}_{2} · OC(NH_{2})_{2}		tetragonal	P4_{3}2_{1}2	a=7.851 c=56.84 Z=4	3504	2.265	light green	
