= Phenethyl alcohol =

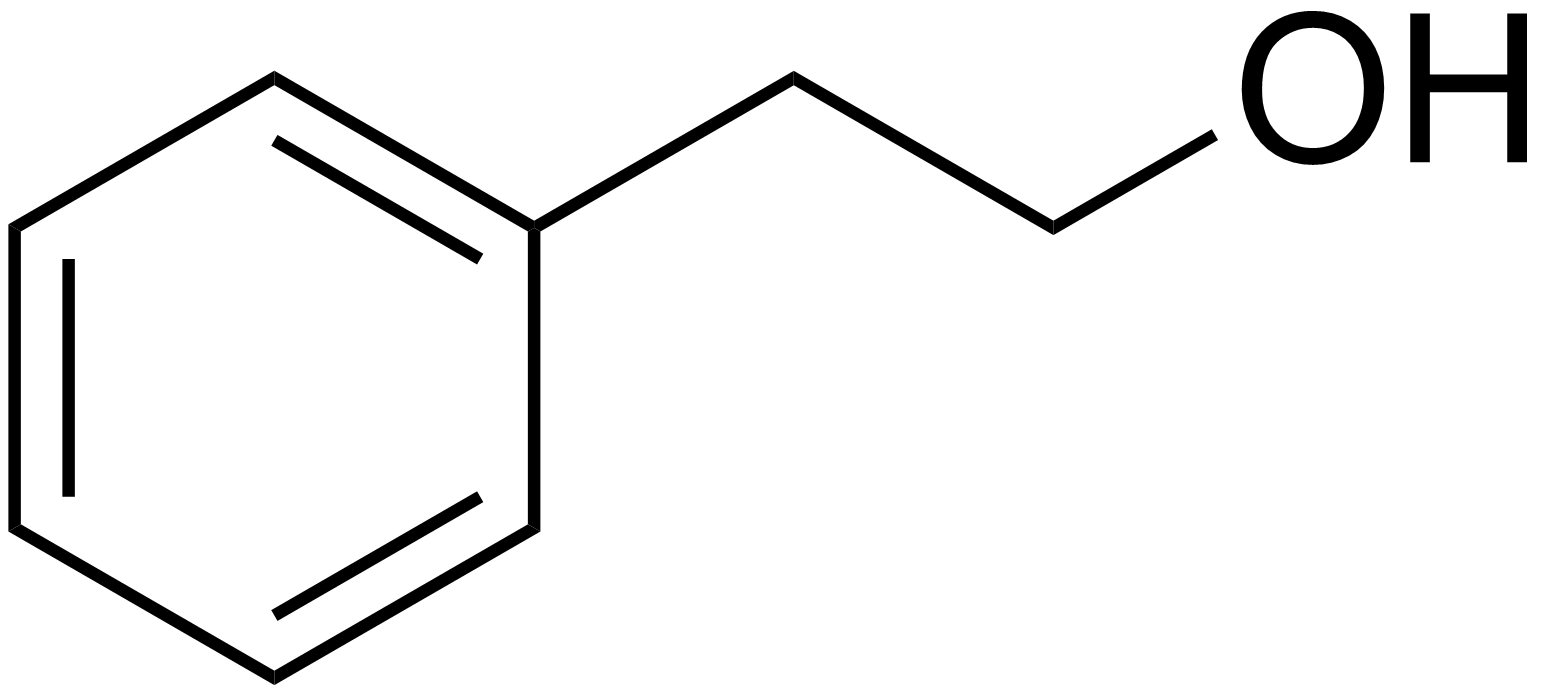
- Skeletal formula

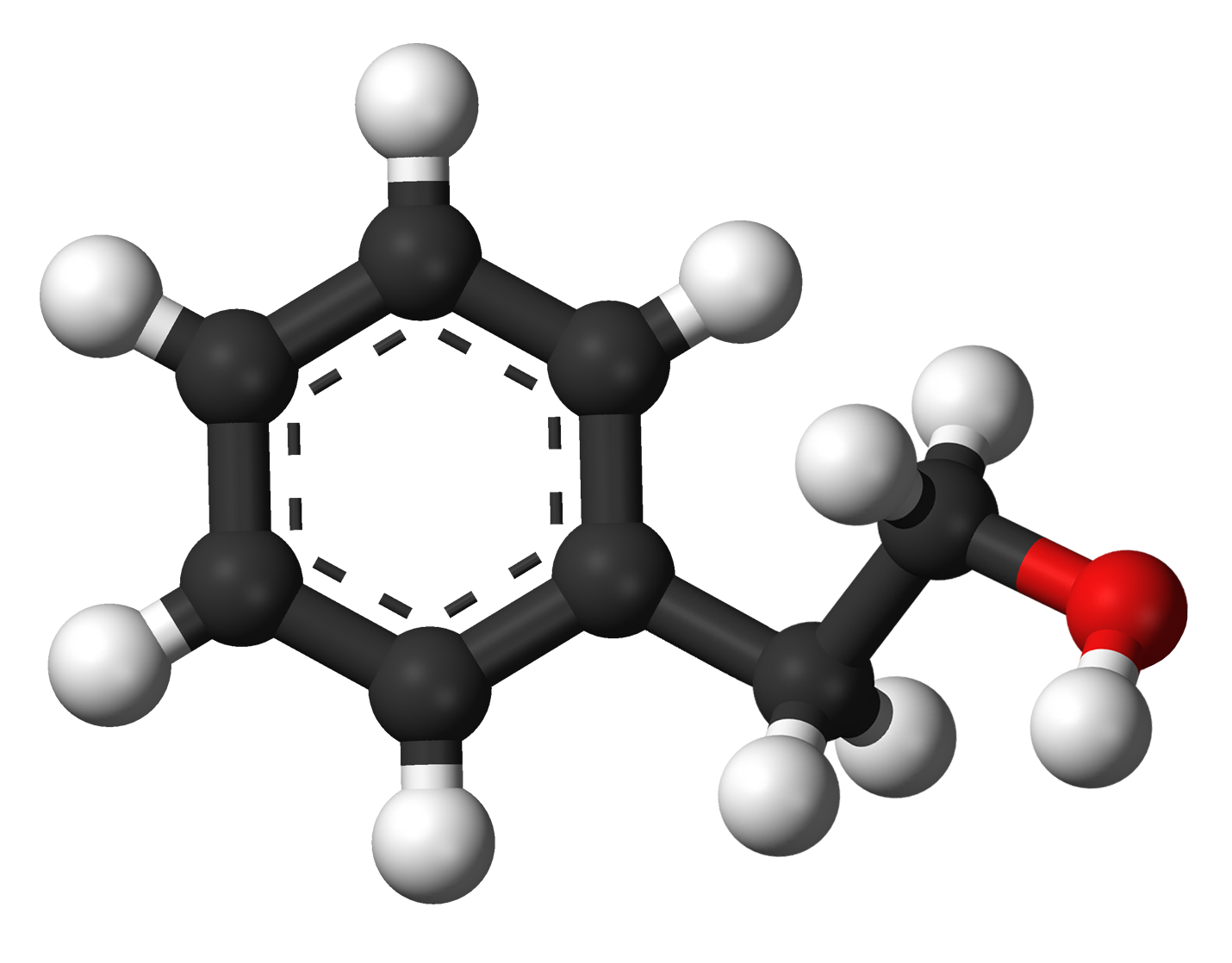
- Ball-and-stick model

Names
- IUPAC name 2-Phenylethanol
- Other names 2-Phenylethanol; Phenethyl alcohol Phenethanol; Benzyl carbinol β-Hydroxyethylbenzene; Benzeneethanol

Identifiers
CAS Number	60-12-8
3D model (JSmol)	Interactive image
Abbreviations	BnCH_{2}OH; Ph(CH_{2})_{2}OH
ChEBI	CHEBI:49000
ChEMBL	ChEMBL448500
ChemSpider	5830
DrugBank	DB02192
ECHA InfoCard	100.000.415
KEGG	D00192
PubChem CID	6054
UNII	ML9LGA7468
CompTox Dashboard (EPA)	DTXSID9026342
- InChI: InChI=1S/C8H10O/c9-7-6-8-4-2-1-3-5-8/h1-5,9H,6-7H2 Key: WRMNZCZEMHIOCP-UHFFFAOYSA-N; InChI=1S/C8H10O/c9-7-6-8-4-2-1-3-5-8/h1-5,9H,6-7H2; InChI=1S/C8H10O/c9-7-6-8-4-2-1-3-5-8/h1-5,9H,6-7H2 Key: WRMNZCZEMHIOCP-UHFFFAOYSA-N
- SMILES: c1ccc(cc1)CCO

Properties
Chemical formula	C_{8}H_{10}O
Molar mass	122.167 g·mol^{−1}
Odor	Soft, like roses
Density	1.017 g/cm^{3}
Melting point	−27 °C (−17 °F; 246 K)
Boiling point	219 to 221 °C (426 to 430 °F; 492 to 494 K)
log P	1.36

Hazards
- GHS labelling
Pictograms	(GHS07: Exclamation mark)
Signal word	Warning
Hazard statements	H302, H319
Precautionary statements	P264, P264+P265, P270, P280, P301+P317, P305+P351+P338, P330, P337+P317, P501
NFPA 704 (fire diamond)	1 1 0
Safety data sheet (SDS)	JT Baker MSDS
- Except where otherwise noted, data are given for materials in their standard state (at 25 °C [77 °F], 100 kPa). verify (what is ?) Infobox references

Phenethyl alcohol, or 2-phenylethanol, is an organic compound with the chemical formula C_{8}H_{10}O or C_{6}H_{5}(CH_{2})_{2}OH. It is a colourless liquid with a pleasant floral odor. It occurs widely in nature, being found in a variety of essential oils. It is slightly soluble in water (2 ml per 100 ml of H_{2}O), but miscible with most organic solvents. The molecule of phenethyl alcohol consists of a phenethyl group (C_{6}H_{5}CH_{2}CH_{2}−) attached to a hydroxyl group (−OH).

== Synthesis ==
Phenethyl alcohol is prepared commercially via two routes. Most common is the Friedel-Crafts reaction between benzene and ethylene oxide in the presence of aluminium trichloride.

C_{6}H_{6} + CH_{2}CH_{2}O + AlCl_{3} → C_{6}H_{5}CH_{2}CH_{2}OAlCl_{2} + HCl

The reaction affords the aluminium alkoxide that is subsequently hydrolyzed to the desired product. The main side product is diphenylethane, which can be avoided by use of excess benzene. Hydrogenation of styrene oxide also affords phenethyl alcohol.

=== Laboratory methods ===
Phenethyl alcohol can also be prepared by the reaction between phenylmagnesium bromide and ethylene oxide:

C_{6}H_{5}MgBr + (CH_{2}CH_{2})O → C_{6}H_{5}CH_{2}CH_{2}OMgBr
C_{6}H_{5}CH_{2}CH_{2}OMgBr + H^{+} → C_{6}H_{5}CH_{2}CH_{2}OH + MgBr^{+}

Phenethyl alcohol can also be produced by biotransformation from L-phenylalanine using immobilized yeast Saccharomyces cerevisiae. It is also possible to produce phenethyl alcohol by the reduction of phenylacetic acid using sodium borohydride and iodine in THF.

== Occurrence and uses ==
Phenethyl alcohol is found in extract of rose, carnation, hyacinth, Aleppo pine, orange blossom, ylang-ylang, geranium, neroli, and champaca. It is also an autoantibiotic produced by the fungus Candida albicans.

Fusel alcohols like phenethyl alcohol are grain fermentation byproducts, and therefore trace amounts of phenethyl alcohol are present in many alcoholic beverages.

It is therefore a common ingredient in flavors and perfumery, particularly when the odor of rose is desired. It is used as an additive in cigarettes. It is also used as a preservative in soaps due to its stability in basic conditions. It is of interest due to its antimicrobial properties.

2-phenylethanol have been investigated as potential postharvest biocontrol agents against gray mold in tomatoes, which inhibited mycelial growth and conidial germination, disrupted membrane integrity, induced reactive oxygen species accumulation and autophagy, and reduced gray mold development in tomatoes. The compound also enhanced disease-resistance enzyme activity without significantly affecting tomato fruit quality.

== See also ==
- 1-Phenylethanol
- Congener
- Wine chemistry
- Phenethylamine
