= 1-Phenylethanol =

Names
- Preferred IUPAC name 1-Phenylethan-1-ol
- Other names Styrallyl alcohol

Identifiers
CAS Number	98-85-1
3D model (JSmol)	Interactive image
ChEBI	CHEBI:669
ChemSpider	7131
ECHA InfoCard	100.002.461
EC Number	202-707-1
PubChem CID	7409
UNII	E6O895DQ52
UN number	2937
CompTox Dashboard (EPA)	DTXSID1020859
- InChI: InChI=1S/C8H10O/c1-7(9)8-5-3-2-4-6-8/h2-7,9H,1H3 Key: WAPNOHKVXSQRPX-UHFFFAOYSA-N
- SMILES: CC(C1=CC=CC=C1)O

Properties
Chemical formula	C_{8}H_{10}O
Molar mass	122.167 g·mol^{−1}
Appearance	Colourless liquid with a floral or almond-like odor
Melting point	20.7 °C (69.3 °F; 293.8 K)
Boiling point	204 °C (399 °F; 477 K)
Solubility in water	1.95 g dm^{−3}
log P	1.4

Hazards
Flash point	93 °C (199 °F; 366 K)
- Except where otherwise noted, data are given for materials in their standard state (at 25 °C [77 °F], 100 kPa). Infobox references

1-Phenylethanol is the organic compound with the formula C_{6}H_{5}CH(OH)CH_{3}. It is one of the most commonly available chiral alcohols. It is a colorless liquid with a mild gardenia-hyacinth scent.

Phenylethanol is an aromatic alcohol, it has the role of mouse metabolite. It is a natural product and is found in Cichorium endivia, Castanopsis cuspidata and other organisms.

== Natural occurrence ==
1-Phenylethanol is found in nature as a glycoside, together with its hydrolase β-primeverosidase in tea (Camellia sinensis) flowers. It is also reportedly present in cranberries, grapes, chives, Scottish spearmint oil, cheeses, cognac, rum, white wine, cocoa, black tea, filbert, cloudberries, beans, mushrooms, and endives.

== Synthesis ==
Racemic 1-phenylethanol is produced by the reduction of acetophenone by sodium borohydride. Alternatively, benzaldehyde can be reacted with methylmagnesium chloride or similar organometallic compounds to afford racemic 1-phenylethanol.

Asymmetric hydrogenation of acetophenone by Noyori catalysts proceeds quantitatively (50 atm H_{2}, room temperature, minutes) in >99% e.e.

The organic oxidising agent ethylbenzene hydroperoxide yields 1-phenylethanol when reduced. Used for the epoxidation of propene, this coproduces propylene oxide, and is an important step in the PO/SM process for the production of styrene.

== Applications ==
In the final step of the PO/SM process, dehydration of 1-phenylethanol yields styrene, analogous to many other dehydrations of alcohols to yield alkenes. While secondary to the direct dehydrogenation of ethylbenzene, the PO/SM method remains industrially significant. This route accounted for approximately 15% of styrene production in the United States in 1993, and has seen international development in the 21st century, especially in developing economies that have seen growth in demand for both styrene and propylene oxide.

== See also ==
- 2-Phenylethanol, achiral isomer of 1-phenylethanol.
- Acetophenone, 1-phenylethanols oxidation product.
