= Fuel surrogate =

Fuel surrogates are mixtures of one or more simple fuels that are designed to emulate either the physical properties (vapor pressure) or combustion properties (laminar flame speed, heating value, etc.) of a more complex fuel. While surrogate mixtures can demonstrate more than one characteristic of the desired fuel, more often than not different components are required in order to emulate the wide variety of properties that are of interest to researchers. Jet fuel is an example of a fuel requiring a surrogate for experimental research and numerical modelling due to its complexity and high content variability from one batch to the next. Neat hydrocarbon jet fuel surrogate components include decane, dodecane, methylcyclohexane, and toluene. Gasoline surrogate components include n-heptane and iso-octane. Hexadecane is a diesel surrogate component. Biodiesel surrogate components include methyl butyrate and methyl decanoate.
