= Urea extraction crystallization =

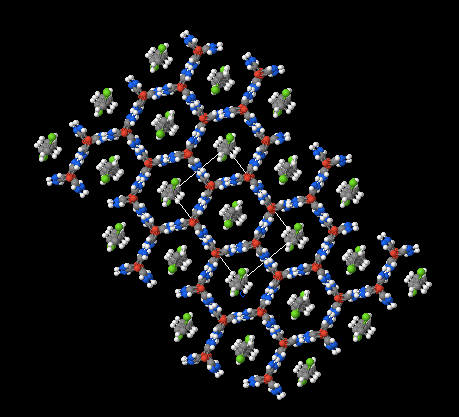
Structure of the 3:1 inclusion complex of urea and 1,6-dichlorohexane. The framework is composed of molecules of urea that are linked by hydrogen bonds, leaving approximately hexagonal channels into which align the molecules of the chlorocarbon. Color scheme: oxygen is red, nitrogen is blue, chlorine is green.

The urea extraction crystallization is a process for separating linear paraffins (n-paraffins, n-alkanes) from hydrocarbon mixtures through the formation of urea-n-paraffin-clathrates. The process is primarily used to lower the pour point of petroleum products, by-products of the process are n-paraffins in high purity. The method may also applied for the separation of fatty acids and fatty alcohols. In addition to urea also thiourea is used in the process.

== History ==
In 1939 German chemist Friedrich Bergen was trying different extractants to separate serum proteins from milk at low temperature. When he tried urea, he noticed that something unusual was going on with milk lipids. A treatment with octanol serendipitously revealed that it combines with urea in large crystals. Bergen investigated different lipids, alkanes and alcohols and found out that at least six carbon atoms are required, and that branched hydrocarbons don't participate in the phenomenon.

Not being an expert in hydrocarbons and urea, he cooperated with Matthias Pier from BASF/IG Farben and then with Wilhelm Schlenk, filing for patents with the latter in 1940, which were awarded in 1953. They didn't publish their findings until 1949 because German authorities classified the discovery during the World War II, but the patent applications were confiscated by Allies' Technical Oil Mission after the war so Sonneborn was able to put a pilot oil dewaxing plant in Petrolia, Pennsylvania into operation already in 1950. DEA AG followed the suit in 1954 and Standard Oil in 1956, and worldwide research in the topic took off in the 1950s.

== Raw materials ==
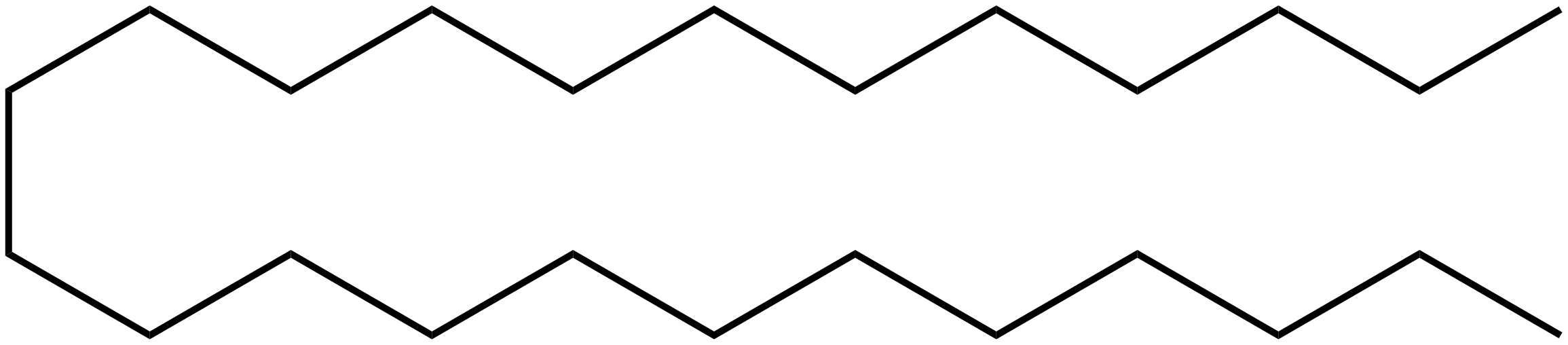
Tetracosane, C_{24}H_{50}, a typical paraffinic component.

In addition to the n-alkanes are also unbranched fatty acids with more than four carbon atoms, their esters and unbranched fatty alcohols can migrate into the channels of the crystallized urea and form a clathrate.

A deviation from the linear molecular geometry, for example, by C=C-double bonds in the molecule, leads to a less stable inclusion compound. Thus stearic acid (C18: 0) forms more stable urea adducts compared to oleic acid (C18: 1 cis -9) or linoleic acid (C18: 2 cis -9, cis -12). A branching in the fatty acid molecule or an autoxidation result in a large deviation from the straight-chain molecular structure, so that these compounds do not form urea adducts. This is used as part of the fatty acid analysis and for the separation or enrichment of specific fatty acids.

== Process ==
For the separation of n-paraffins from other hydrocarbon compounds, urea is added with an approximately 20-fold molar excess. The urea crystallizes in a hexagonal crystal structure with about 5.5 to 5.8 Å wide channels. In these channels the n-paraffins are included. If the concentration of n-paraffins in the mixture is too high, the mixture is diluted with a solvent.

In general, the reaction proceeds according to the scheme:

urea + adduct component -> urea adduct

The equilibrium of the reaction is dependent on the concentrations of the reactants, the solvent and the temperature. The necessary quantity of urea for the formation of inclusion compounds varies from about 1 to 0.8 mole of urea per methyl- and methylene group in a carbon chain. The urea is added as a supersaturated aqueous solution to compensate for losses due to adduct formation during the process. In order to avoid a too high concentrations of adducts in the dewaxed oil a solvent such as methyl isobutyl ketone or methylene chloride is used for dilution. The ratio of oil to water phase is about 1 to 0.5. The mixing of the oil and water phases occurs at slightly elevated temperatures of about 35 °C. In the course of the reaction the mixture is cooled to room temperature. Lower temperatures are advantageous for the formation of inclusion complexes.

The urea-paraffin-adduct can be filtered off and thereby separated from the iso-paraffins and other non-paraffinic components. By washing with a solvent a solid adduct residue is obtained. The washing of the clathrates with hot water at about 75 °C breaks up the clathrates and releases the paraffins. The obtained n-paraffins have a purity of about 99%. Losses of urea are small, the hot urea solution can be returned directly back into the process.

== Literature ==
- Kenneth D. M. Harris: Fundamental and Applied Aspects of Urea and Thiourea Inclusion Compounds. In: Supramolecular Chemistry. 19, 2007, p. 47-72, doi:10.1080/10610270600977706.
