= Tridecane =

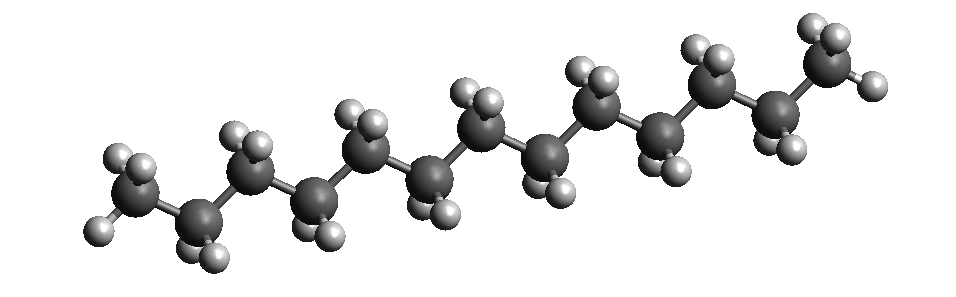

Names
- Preferred IUPAC name Tridecane

Identifiers
CAS Number	629-50-5
3D model (JSmol)	Interactive image
Beilstein Reference	1733089
ChEBI	CHEBI:35998
ChEMBL	ChEMBL135694
ChemSpider	11882
ECHA InfoCard	100.010.086
EC Number	211-093-4
KEGG	C13834
MeSH	tridecane
PubChem CID	12388
RTECS number	YD3025000
UNII	A3LZF0L939
CompTox Dashboard (EPA)	DTXSID6027266
- InChI: InChI=1S/C13H28/c1-3-5-7-9-11-13-12-10-8-6-4-2/h3-13H2,1-2H3 Key: IIYFAKIEWZDVMP-UHFFFAOYSA-N
- SMILES: CCCCCCCCCCCCC

Properties
Chemical formula	C_{13}H_{28}
Molar mass	184.367 g·mol^{−1}
Appearance	Colourless liquid
Odor	Gasoline-like to odorless
Density	0.756 g mL^{−1}
Melting point	−6 to −4 °C; 21 to 25 °F; 267 to 269 K
Boiling point	232 to 236 °C; 449 to 457 °F; 505 to 509 K
log P	7.331
Vapor pressure	0.52 mmHg (at 59.4 °C)
Henry's law constant (k_{H})	4.3 nmol Pa^{−1} kg^{−1}
Refractive index (n_{D})	1.425

Thermochemistry
Heat capacity (C)	406.89 J K^{−1} mol^{−1}
Std enthalpy of formation (Δ_{f}H^{⦵}_{298})	−379.3–−376.1 kJ mol^{−1}
Std enthalpy of combustion (Δ_{c}H^{⦵}_{298})	−8.7411–−8.7383 MJ mol^{−1}

Hazards
- GHS labelling
Pictograms	(GHS07: Exclamation mark)
Signal word	Warning
Hazard statements	H315, H319, H335
Precautionary statements	P261, P305+P351+P338
Flash point	94 °C (201 °F; 367 K)
- Lethal dose or concentration (LD, LC)
LD_{50} (median dose)	1.161 g kg^{−1} (intravenous, mouse)

Related compounds
Related alkanes	Dodecane; Tetradecane
- Except where otherwise noted, data are given for materials in their standard state (at 25 °C [77 °F], 100 kPa). verify (what is ?) Infobox references

Tridecane or n-tridecane is an alkane with the chemical formula CH_{3}(CH_{2})_{11}CH_{3}. Tridecane is a combustible colourless liquid. In industry, they have no specific value aside from being components of various fuels and solvents. In the research laboratory, tridecane is also used as a distillation chaser.

== Natural occurrence ==
Nymphs of the southern green shield bug produce tridecane as a dispersion/aggregation pheromone, which possibly serves as a defense against predators. It is also the main component of the defensive fluid produced by the stink bug Cosmopepla bimaculata.

== See also ==
- Higher alkanes
