= Undecane =

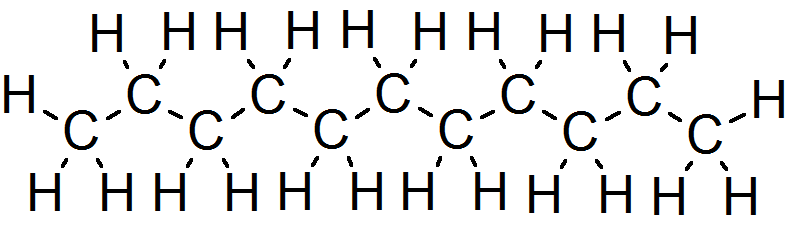

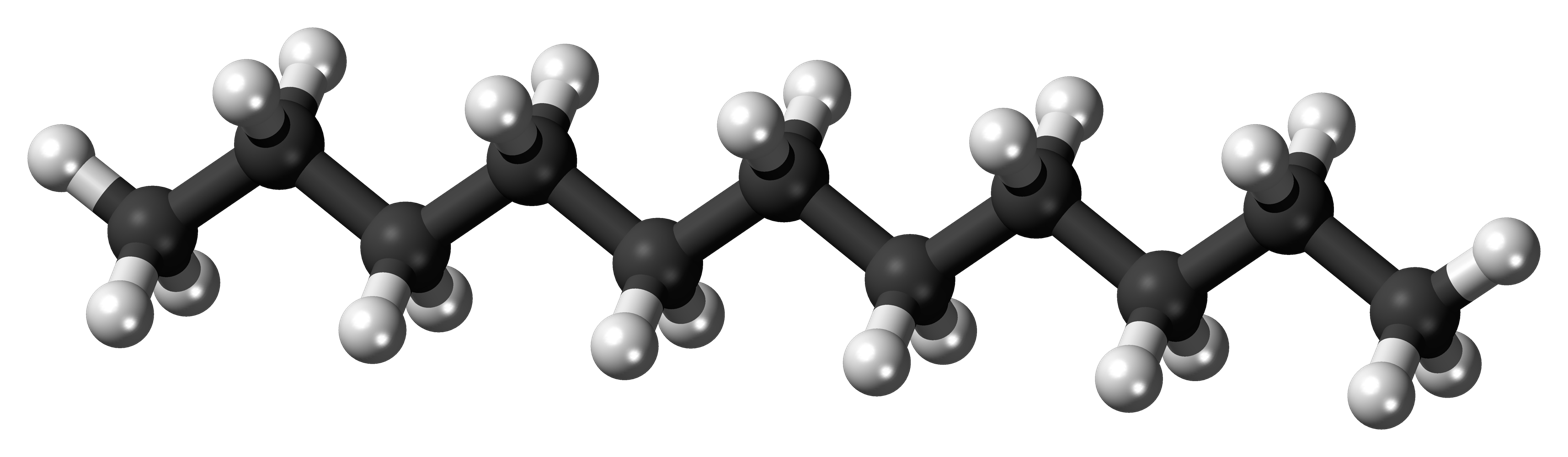

Names
- Preferred IUPAC name Undecane

Identifiers
CAS Number	1120-21-4
3D model (JSmol)	Interactive image
Beilstein Reference	1697099
ChEBI	CHEBI:46342
ChEMBL	ChEMBL132474
ChemSpider	13619
ECHA InfoCard	100.013.001
EC Number	214-300-6
MeSH	undecane
PubChem CID	14257
RTECS number	YQ1525000
UNII	JV0QT00NUE
UN number	2330
CompTox Dashboard (EPA)	DTXSID9021689
- InChI: InChI=1S/C11H24/c1-3-5-7-9-11-10-8-6-4-2/h3-11H2,1-2H3 Key: RSJKGSCJYJTIGS-UHFFFAOYSA-N
- SMILES: CCCCCCCCCCC

Properties
Chemical formula	C_{11}H_{24}
Molar mass	156.313 g·mol^{−1}
Appearance	Colorless liquid
Odor	Gasoline-like to Odorless
Density	740 g/L
Melting point	−26 °C (−15 °F; 247 K)
Boiling point	196 °C (385 °F; 469 K)
log P	6.312
Vapor pressure	55 Pa (at 25 °C)
Henry's law constant (k_{H})	5.4 nmol Pa^{−1} kg^{−1}
Magnetic susceptibility (χ)	−131.84·10^{−6} cm^{3}/mol
Refractive index (n_{D})	1.417

Thermochemistry
Heat capacity (C)	345.05 J K^{−1} mol^{−1}
Std molar entropy (S^{⦵}_{298})	458.15 J K^{−1} mol^{−1}
Std enthalpy of formation (Δ_{f}H^{⦵}_{298})	−329.8 – −324.6 kJ mol^{−1}
Std enthalpy of combustion (Δ_{c}H^{⦵}_{298})	−7.4339 – −7.4287 MJ mol^{−1}

Hazards
- GHS labelling
Pictograms	(GHS02: Flammable) (GHS08: Health hazard)
Signal word	Danger
Hazard statements	H304, H315, H319, H331, H335
Precautionary statements	P261, P301+P310, P305+P351+P338, P311, P331
NFPA 704 (fire diamond)	3 2 0
Flash point	60.0 °C (140.0 °F; 333.1 K)
Autoignition temperature	240 °C (464 °F; 513 K)
- Lethal dose or concentration (LD, LC)
LD_{50} (median dose)	> 2000 mg/kg (rat, oral) > 5000 mg/kg (rat, dermal)
LC_{50} (median concentration)	> 20 mg/L (rat, 8 hours)
Safety data sheet (SDS)	Fisher Scientific

Related compounds
Related alkanes	Decane; Dodecane
- Except where otherwise noted, data are given for materials in their standard state (at 25 °C [77 °F], 100 kPa). verify (what is ?) Infobox references

Undecane (also known as hendecane) is a liquid alkane hydrocarbon with the chemical formula CH_{3}(CH_{2})_{9}CH_{3}. It is used as a mild sex attractant for various types of moths and cockroaches, and an alert signal for a variety of ants. It has 159 structural isomers.

Undecane may also be used as an internal standard in gas chromatography when working with other hydrocarbons. Since the boiling point of undecane (196 °C) is well known, it may be used as a comparison for retention times in a gas chromatograph for molecules whose structure has been freshly elucidated. For example, if one is working with a 50 m crosslinked methyl silicone capillary column with an oven temperature increasing slowly, beginning around 60 °C, an 11-carbon molecule like undecane may be used as an internal standard to be compared with the retention times of other 10-, 11-, or 12- carbon molecules, depending on their structures.

== See also ==
- Higher alkanes
- Cycloundecane
