= Hentriacontane =

- Skeletal formula of hentriacontane

Names
- Preferred IUPAC name Hentriacontane

Identifiers
CAS Number	630-04-6
3D model (JSmol)	Interactive image
Beilstein Reference	1709817
ChEBI	CHEBI:5659
ChEMBL	ChEMBL257490
ChemSpider	11904
KEGG	C08376
MeSH	hentriacontane
PubChem CID	12410
UNII	6SDG640HL3
CompTox Dashboard (EPA)	DTXSID0075443
- InChI: InChI=1S/C31H64/c1-3-5-7-9-11-13-15-17-19-21-23-25-27-29-31-30-28-26-24-22-20-18-16-14-12-10-8-6-4-2/h3-31H2,1-2H3 Key: IUJAMGNYPWYUPM-UHFFFAOYSA-N
- SMILES: CCCCCCCCCCCCCCCCCCCCCCCCCCCCCCC

Properties
Chemical formula	C_{31}H_{64}
Molar mass	436.853 g·mol^{−1}
Appearance	White, opaque, waxy crystals
Density	0.781 g cm^{−3} at 68 °C
Melting point	67.5 to 69.3 °C; 153.4 to 156.7 °F; 340.6 to 342.4 K
Boiling point	458 °C (856 °F; 731 K)
log P	16.501

Thermochemistry
Heat capacity (C)	912 J K^{−1} mol^{−1} (at 50 °C)

Hazards
- GHS labelling
Pictograms	(GHS07: Exclamation mark)
Signal word	Warning
Hazard statements	H315, H319

Related compounds
Related alkanes	Nonacosane
- Except where otherwise noted, data are given for materials in their standard state (at 25 °C [77 °F], 100 kPa). verify (what is ?) Infobox references

Hentriacontane, also called untriacontane, is a solid, long-chain alkane hydrocarbon with the structural formula CH_{3}(CH_{2})_{29}CH_{3}. It is the main component of paraffin wax.

It is found in a variety of plants, including peas (Pisum sativum), Acacia senegal, Gymnema sylvestre and others, and also comprises about 8–9% of beeswax. It has 10,660,307,791 constitutional isomers.
