= Dodecane =

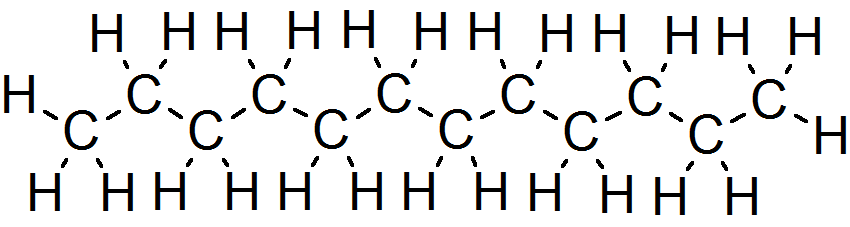

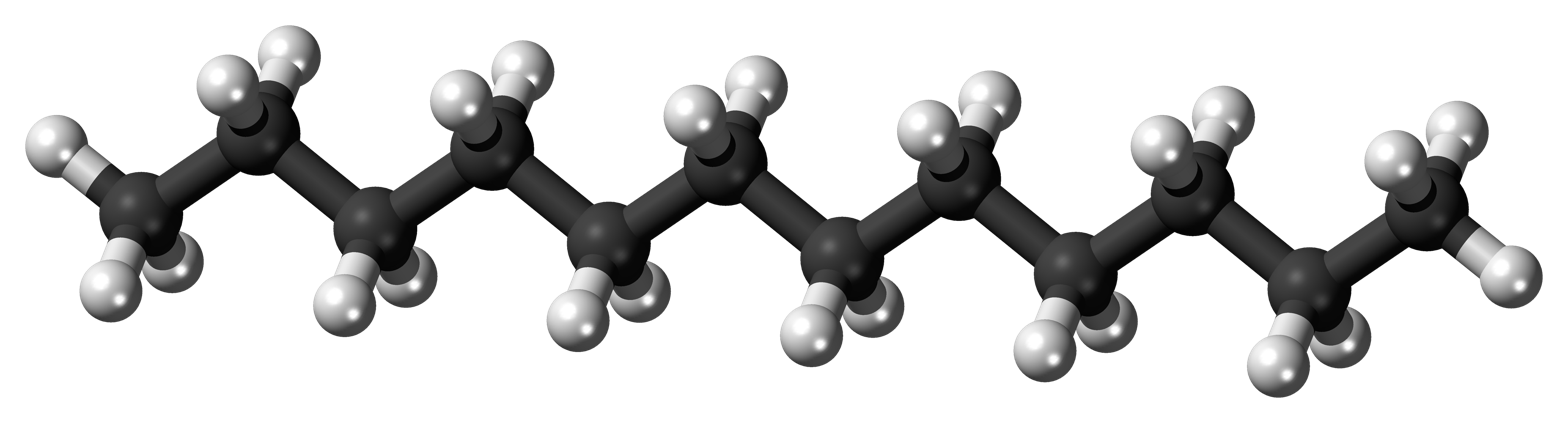

Names
- Preferred IUPAC name Dodecane

Identifiers
CAS Number	112-40-3
3D model (JSmol)	Interactive image
Beilstein Reference	1697175
ChEBI	CHEBI:28817
ChEMBL	ChEMBL30959
ChemSpider	7890
DrugBank	DB02771
ECHA InfoCard	100.003.607
EC Number	203-967-9
Gmelin Reference	201408
KEGG	C08374
MeSH	n-dodecane
PubChem CID	8182
RTECS number	JR2125000
UNII	11A386X1QH
CompTox Dashboard (EPA)	DTXSID0026913
- InChI: InChI=1S/C12H26/c1-3-5-7-9-11-12-10-8-6-4-2/h3-12H2,1-2H3 Key: SNRUBQQJIBEYMU-UHFFFAOYSA-N
- SMILES: CCCCCCCCCCCC

Properties
Chemical formula	C_{12}H_{26}
Molar mass	170.340 g·mol^{−1}
Appearance	Colorless liquid
Odor	Gasoline-like to odorless
Density	0.7495 g mL^{−1} at 20 °C
Melting point	−10.0 to −9.3 °C; 14.1 to 15.2 °F; 263.2 to 263.8 K
Boiling point	214 to 218 °C; 417 to 424 °F; 487 to 491 K
log P	6.821
Vapor pressure	18 Pa (at 25 °C)
Henry's law constant (k_{H})	1.4 nmol Pa^{−1} kg^{−1}
Refractive index (n_{D})	1.421
Viscosity	1.34 mPa s

Thermochemistry
Heat capacity (C)	376.00 J K^{−1} mol^{−1}
Std molar entropy (S^{⦵}_{298})	490.66 J K^{−1} mol^{−1}
Std enthalpy of formation (Δ_{f}H^{⦵}_{298})	−353.5–−350.7 kJ mol^{−1}
Std enthalpy of combustion (Δ_{c}H^{⦵}_{298})	−7901.74 kJ mol^{−1}

Hazards
- GHS labelling
Pictograms	(GHS08: Health hazard)
Signal word	Danger
Hazard statements	H304
Precautionary statements	P301+P310, P331
NFPA 704 (fire diamond)	1 2 0
Flash point	71 °C (160 °F; 344 K)
Autoignition temperature	205 °C (401 °F; 478 K)
Explosive limits	0.6%
Safety data sheet (SDS)	hazard.com

Related compounds
Related alkanes	Undecane; Tridecane
- Except where otherwise noted, data are given for materials in their standard state (at 25 °C [77 °F], 100 kPa). verify (what is ?) Infobox references

Dodecane (also known as dihexyl, bihexyl, adakane 12, or duodecane) is an oily liquid n-alkane hydrocarbon with the chemical formula C_{12}H_{26} (which has 355 structural isomers).

It is used as a solvent, distillation chaser, and scintillator component. It is used as a diluent for tributyl phosphate (TBP) in nuclear reprocessing plants.

== Combustion reaction ==
The combustion reaction of dodecane is as follows:

C_{12}H_{26}(l) + 18.5 O_{2}(g) → 12 CO_{2}(g) + 13 H_{2}O(g)

ΔH° = −7513 kJ

One litre of fuel needs about 15 kg of air to burn (2.6 kg of oxygen), and generates 2.3 kg (or 1.2 m^{3}) of CO_{2} upon complete combustion.

== Jet fuel surrogate ==
In recent years, n-dodecane has garnered attention as a possible surrogate for kerosene-based fuels such as Jet-A, S-8, and other conventional aviation fuels. It is considered a second-generation fuel surrogate designed to emulate the laminar flame speed, largely supplanting n-decane, primarily due to its higher molecular mass and lower hydrogen-to-carbon ratio which better reflect the n-alkane content of jet fuels.

== See also ==
- Higher alkanes
- Kerosene
