= Tetracosane =

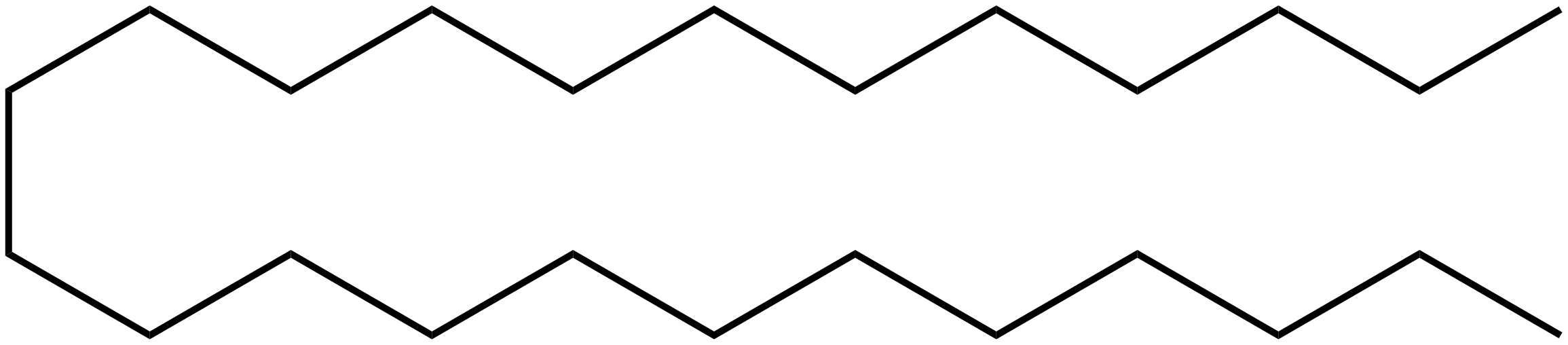
- Structural formula of tetracosane

Names
- Preferred IUPAC name Tetracosane

Identifiers
CAS Number	646-31-1
3D model (JSmol)	Interactive image
Beilstein Reference	1758462
ChEBI	CHEBI:32936
ChemSpider	12072
ECHA InfoCard	100.010.432
EC Number	211-474-5
PubChem CID	12592
UNII	YQ5H1M1D7I
CompTox Dashboard (EPA)	DTXSID8060955
- InChI: InChI=1S/C24H50/c1-3-5-7-9-11-13-15-17-19-21-23-24-22-20-18-16-14-12-10-8-6-4-2/h3-24H2,1-2H3 Key: POOSGDOYLQNASK-UHFFFAOYSA-N
- SMILES: CCCCCCCCCCCCCCCCCCCCCCCC

Properties
Chemical formula	C_{24}H_{50}
Molar mass	338.664 g·mol^{−1}
Appearance	Colourless, waxy crystals
Odor	Oil of Hamamelis leaves
Melting point	48 to 54 °C; 118 to 129 °F; 321 to 327 K
Boiling point	391.4 °C; 736.4 °F; 664.5 K
Solubility in water	not soluble
Solubility	very soluble in benzene, toluene, ether, soluble in alcohol.

Structure
Crystal structure	Orthorhombic
Dipole moment	0 D

Thermochemistry
Heat capacity (C)	730.9 J K^{−1} mol^{−1}
Std molar entropy (S^{⦵}_{298})	651.0 J K^{−1} mol^{−1}

Hazards
Flash point	> 113 °C (235 °F; 386 K)

Related compounds
Related alkanes	Heneicosane; Nonacosane
- Except where otherwise noted, data are given for materials in their standard state (at 25 °C [77 °F], 100 kPa). verify (what is ?) Infobox references

Tetracosane, also called tetrakosane, is an alkane hydrocarbon with the structural formula C_{24}H_{50} or CH_{3}(CH_{2})_{22}CH_{3}. As with other alkanes, its name is derived from Greek for the number of carbon atoms, 24, in the molecule. It has 14,490,245 constitutional isomers, and 252,260,276 stereoisomers.

n-Tetracosane is found in mineral form, called evenkite, in the Evenki Region on Lower Tunguska River in Siberia and the Bucnik quarry near Konma in eastern Moravia, Czech Republic. Evenkite is found as colourless flakes and is reported to fluoresce yellow-orange.

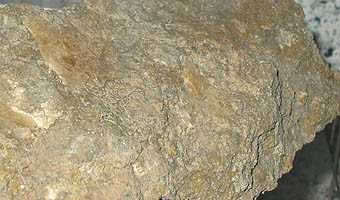
A sample of evenkite, the mineral form of n-tetracosane

== See also ==
- List of alkanes
