= Pentatriacontane =

Names
- Preferred IUPAC name Pentatriacontane

Identifiers
CAS Number	630-07-9
3D model (JSmol)	Interactive image
ChemSpider	11907
EC Number	685–675–5
PubChem CID	12413
UNII	KP13LFH341
CompTox Dashboard (EPA)	DTXSID9074723
- InChI: InChI=1S/C35H72/c1-3-5-7-9-11-13-15-17-19-21-23-25-27-29-31-33-35-34-32-30-28-26-24-22-20-18-16-14-12-10-8-6-4-2/h3-35H2,1-2H3 Key: VHQQPFLOGSTQPC-UHFFFAOYSA-N
- SMILES: CCCCCCCCCCCCCCCCCCCCCCCCCCCCCCCCCCC

Properties
Chemical formula	C_{35}H_{72}
Molar mass	492.961 g·mol^{−1}
Appearance	waxy solid
Density	0.813 g/cm^{3}
Melting point	74.4 °C
Boiling point	489 °C
Solubility in water	insoluble
- Except where otherwise noted, data are given for materials in their standard state (at 25 °C [77 °F], 100 kPa). Infobox references

Pentatriacontane is a hydrocarbon from the group of paraffins, an organic chemical compound of the alkane class. The chemical formula is C_{35}H_{72}.

== Synthesis ==
It was first obtained by reducing pentatriacontane chloride, which was obtained in turn by the reaction of phosphorus pentachloride with stearone, in reaction with hydrogen iodide and phosphorus heated to 240 °C.

== Physical properties ==
Pentatriacontane is classified as a hydrocarbon lipid molecule. It is extremely hydrophobic, completely insoluble in water, and chemically neutral. Pentatriacontane appears as a waxy solid.

== Natural occurrence ==
This naturally occurring substance can be found in parsley, various plant essential oils, and Candelilla wax. The wax is obtained from the leaves of the small Candelilla shrub, which is native to northern Mexico and the southwestern United States. This shrub belongs to the Euphorbia genus within the Euphorbiaceae family.

== Uses ==
Candelilla wax is used as a food additive and glazing agent, as well as in the cosmetics industry where it serves as an ingredient in lip balms and lotion bars. A prominent use of the wax is as a binder in chewing gum. It often serves as an alternative to carnauba wax and beeswax and is also employed in varnish production.
