= Heneicosane =

Names
- Preferred IUPAC name Henicosane
- Other names n-Heneicosane

Identifiers
CAS Number	629-94-7
3D model (JSmol)	Interactive image
Beilstein Reference	1748500
ChEBI	CHEBI:32931
ChemSpider	11897
ECHA InfoCard	100.010.109
EC Number	211-118-9
PubChem CID	12403
UNII	I93S5U5DMP
CompTox Dashboard (EPA)	DTXSID9047097
- InChI: InChI=1S/C21H44/c1-3-5-7-9-11-13-15-17-19-21-20-18-16-14-12-10-8-6-4-2/h3-21H2,1-2H3 Key: FNAZRRHPUDJQCJ-UHFFFAOYSA-N
- SMILES: CCCCCCCCCCCCCCCCCCCCC

Properties
Chemical formula	C_{21}H_{44}
Molar mass	296.583 g·mol^{−1}
Appearance	Waxy solid
Density	0.7919 g mL^{−1}
Melting point	40.5 °C (104.9 °F; 313.6 K)
Boiling point	356.10 °C; 672.98 °F; 629.25 K
Solubility in water	2.9·10^{−11} g/L
log P	10.65
Vapor pressure	8.73·10^{−5} mm Hg
Henry's law constant (k_{H})	120 atm·m^{3}/mole
Refractive index (n_{D})	1.4441

Hazards
NFPA 704 (fire diamond)	1 1 0
Flash point	113 °C (235 °F; 386 K)

Related compounds
Related alkanes	Icosane; Tetracosane
- Except where otherwise noted, data are given for materials in their standard state (at 25 °C [77 °F], 100 kPa). Infobox references

Heneicosane is the organic compound with the formula CH_{3}(CH_{2})_{19}CH_{3}. It is the straight chain, saturated C21 hydrocarbon. It is a white wax.

== Natural occurrence ==
Heneicosane is used as a pheromone by the queen or king termites in the species Reticulitermes flavipes. It also attracts mosquitoes in the genus Aedes and can be used in mosquito baits. This works in nature as the hydrocarbon is produced in the skin of the larva. A 1:100000 fraction in water is the most attractive, but if the concentration is 1:1000 then mosquitoes are repelled instead. Heneicosane is one of the major components of the safflower flower essential oil (Carthamus tinctorius). All parts of the plant Periploca laevigata contain heneicosane. Rosa damascena flower essential oil contains 5% heneicosane. Sambucus nigra contains 2.3%.
