= Eicosane =

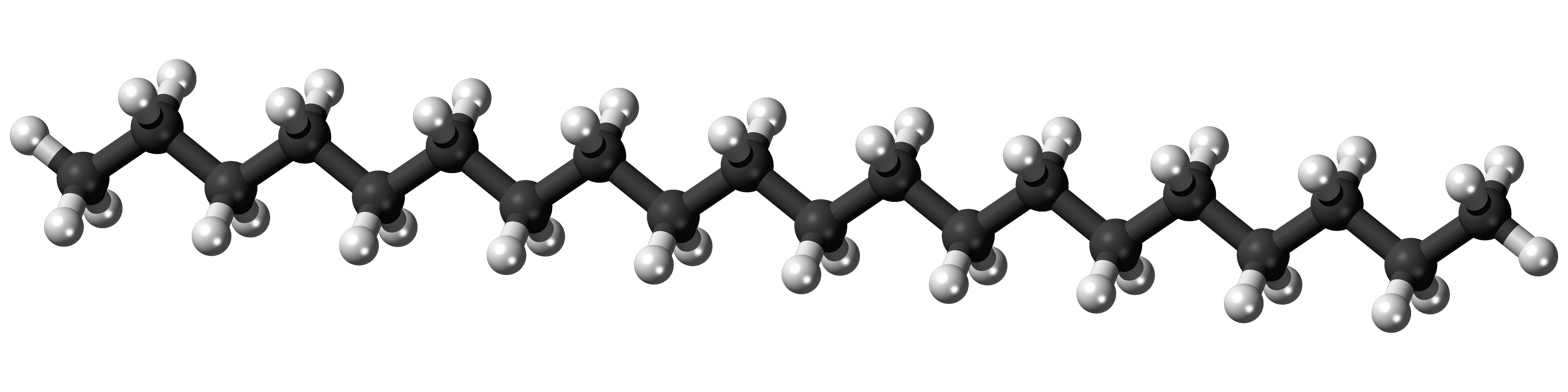

Names
- Preferred IUPAC name Icosane
- Other names n-Eicosane, Eichosane

Identifiers
CAS Number	112-95-8
3D model (JSmol)	Interactive image
Beilstein Reference	1700722
ChEBI	CHEBI:43619
ChEMBL	ChEMBL1233983
ChemSpider	7929
ECHA InfoCard	100.003.653
EC Number	204-018-1
MeSH	eicosane
PubChem CID	8222
UNII	3AYA9KEC48
CompTox Dashboard (EPA)	DTXSID1025227
- InChI: InChI=1S/C20H42/c1-3-5-7-9-11-13-15-17-19-20-18-16-14-12-10-8-6-4-2/h3-20H2,1-2H3 Key: CBFCDTFDPHXCNY-UHFFFAOYSA-N
- SMILES: CCCCCCCCCCCCCCCCCCCC

Properties
Chemical formula	C_{20}H_{42}
Molar mass	282.556 g·mol^{−1}
Appearance	Colorless, waxy crystals
Odor	Odorless
Melting point	36 to 38 °C; 97 to 100 °F; 309 to 311 K
Boiling point	343.1 °C; 649.5 °F; 616.2 K
log P	10.897
Henry's law constant (k_{H})	31 μmol Pa^{−1} kg^{−1}

Thermochemistry
Heat capacity (C)	602.5 J K^{−1} mol^{−1} (at 6.0 °C)
Std molar entropy (S^{⦵}_{298})	558.6 J K^{−1} mol^{−1}

Hazards
- GHS labelling
Pictograms	(GHS08: Health hazard)
Signal word	Danger
Hazard statements	H304
Precautionary statements	P301+P316, P331, P405, P501
NFPA 704 (fire diamond)	0 1 0
Flash point	> 113 °C (235 °F; 386 K)

Related compounds
Related alkanes	Nonadecane; Heneicosane
- Except where otherwise noted, data are given for materials in their standard state (at 25 °C [77 °F], 100 kPa). verify (what is ?) Infobox references

Eicosane (alternative spellings icosane and eichosane) is an alkane with the chemical formula C_{20}H_{42}. It has 366,319 constitutional isomers.

n-Eicosane (the straight-chain structural isomer of eicosane) is the shortest compound found in paraffin waxes, used to form candles. It can be isolated from agave attenuate leaves. It is also found in Vanilla madagascariensis and Gymnodinium nagasakiense.

Eicosane's size, state and chemical inactivity do not exclude it from the traits of its smaller alkane counterparts. It is a colorless or white, non-polar molecule, nearly unreactive except when it burns. It is less dense than and insoluble in water. Its non-polar trait means it can only perform weak intermolecular bonding (hydrophobic/van der Waals forces).

Eicosane's phase transition at a moderate temperature makes it a candidate phase change material, or PCM, which can be used to store thermal energy and control temperature.

It can be detected in the body odor of persons suffering from Parkinson's disease.

== Naming ==
It is derived from ἐίκοσι (eikosi), Greek for 20 (cf. icosahedron).

IUPAC currently recommends icosane, whereas Chemical Abstracts Service and Beilstein use eicosane.

== See also ==
- Perillaldehyde
