= Nonadecane =

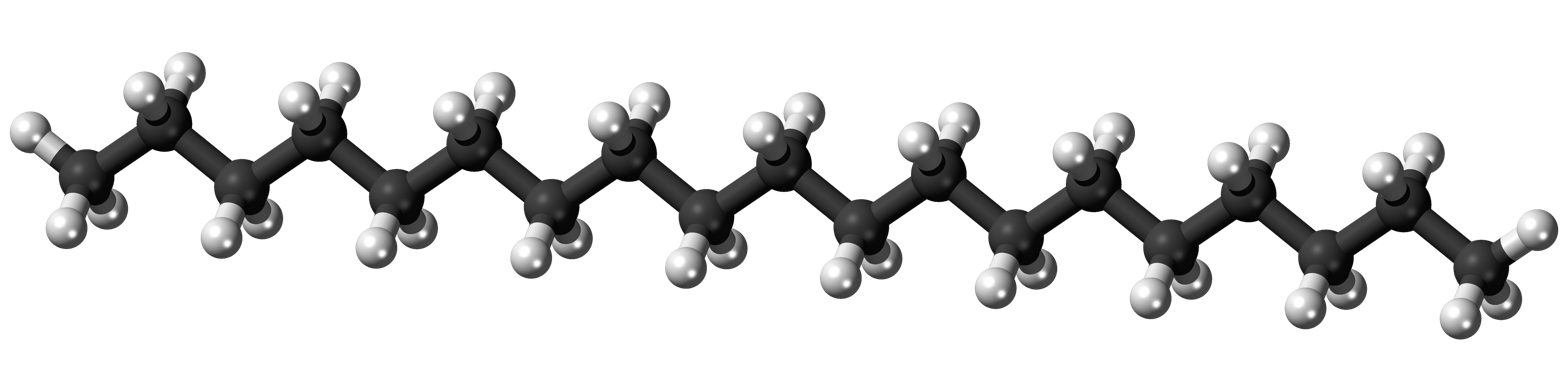

Names
- Preferred IUPAC name Nonadecane

Identifiers
CAS Number	629-92-5
3D model (JSmol)	Interactive image
ChemSpider	11895
ECHA InfoCard	100.010.107
EC Number	211-116-8
PubChem CID	12401
UNII	NMY21D3Y5T
CompTox Dashboard (EPA)	DTXSID9047170
- InChI: InChI=1S/C19H40/c1-3-5-7-9-11-13-15-17-19-18-16-14-12-10-8-6-4-2/h3-19H2,1-2H3 Key: LQERIDTXQFOHKA-UHFFFAOYSA-N
- SMILES: C(CCCCCCCCCCCCCCCCC)C

Properties
Chemical formula	C_{19}H_{40}
Molar mass	268.529 g·mol^{−1}
Appearance	White crystals or powder
Density	0.786 g·cm^{3} (at 20 °C)
Melting point	32 °C (90 °F; 305 K)
Boiling point	330 °C (626 °F; 603 K)
Vapor pressure	1 mmHg at 133 °C

Hazards
NFPA 704 (fire diamond)	0 1 0
Flash point	168 °C (334 °F; 441 K)
Autoignition temperature	230 °C (446 °F; 503 K)

Related compounds
Related alkanes	Octadecane; Icosane
- Except where otherwise noted, data are given for materials in their standard state (at 25 °C [77 °F], 100 kPa). Infobox references

Nonadecane is an alkane hydrocarbon with the chemical formula CH_{3}(CH_{2})_{17}CH_{3}, simplified to C_{19}H_{40}.

== Occurrence in nature ==
Nonadecane is found in Rosa × damascena (8%–15%), Rosa × alba (7%–13%) and n-Paraffin rich high altitude hybrids of both (20%–55%).

== Applications ==
N-nonadecane has been the subject of research as a thermal energy storage medium. Nonadecane micro- and nanocapsules, and composites of the compound with other materials such as cement, have been investigated as phase change materials (PCMs) for thermal energy storage.

== See also ==
- Rose oil
- Paraffin
