= Tetradecane =

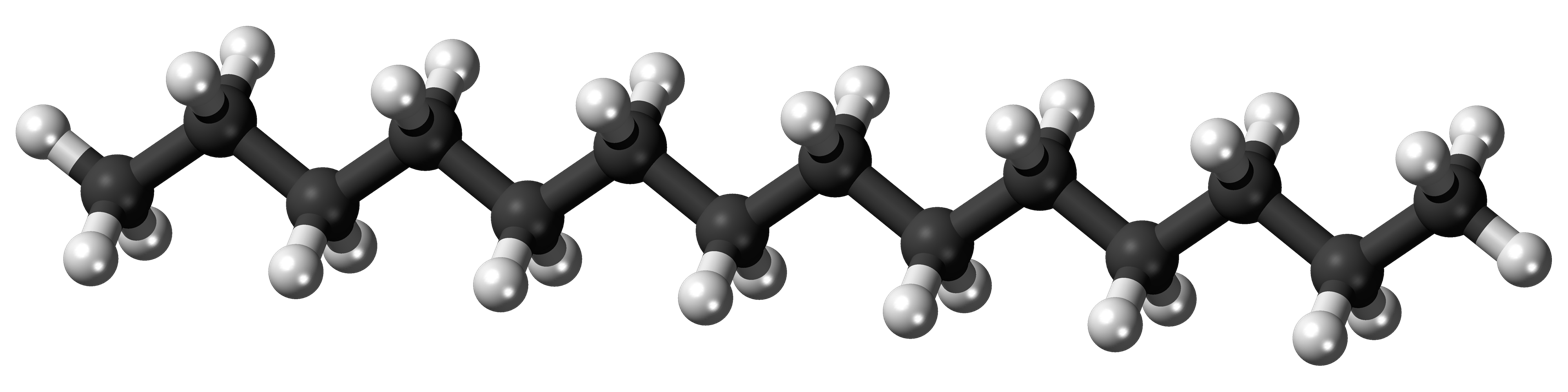

Names
- Preferred IUPAC name Tetradecane

Identifiers
CAS Number	629-59-4
3D model (JSmol)	Interactive image
ChEBI	CHEBI:41253
ChemSpider	11883
ECHA InfoCard	100.010.088
EC Number	292-448-0
MeSH	tetradecane
PubChem CID	12389
UNII	03LY784Y58
CompTox Dashboard (EPA)	DTXSID1027267
- InChI: InChI=1S/C14H30/c1-3-5-7-9-11-13-14-12-10-8-6-4-2/h3-13H2,1-2H3 Key: BGHCVCJVXZWKCC-UHFFFAOYSA-N
- SMILES: CCCCCCCCCCCCCC

Properties
Chemical formula	C_{14}H_{30}
Molar mass	198.394 g·mol^{−1}
Appearance	Colourless liquid
Odor	Gasoline-like to odorless
Density	0.762 g mL^{−1}
Melting point	4 to 6 °C; 39 to 43 °F; 277 to 279 K
Boiling point	253 to 257 °C; 487 to 494 °F; 526 to 530 K

Thermochemistry
Heat capacity (C)	J K^{−1} mol^{−1}
Std enthalpy of formation (Δ_{f}H^{⦵}_{298})	45.07 kJ mol^{−1}
Std enthalpy of combustion (Δ_{c}H^{⦵}_{298})	−9.46466 to −9.39354 MJ mol^{−1}

Hazards
- GHS labelling
Pictograms	(GHS07: Exclamation mark)
Signal word	Warning
Flash point	99 °C (210 °F; 372 K)
- Lethal dose or concentration (LD, LC)
LD_{50} (median dose)	g kg^{−1} (intravenous, mouse)

Related compounds
Related alkanes	Tridecane; Pentadecane
- Except where otherwise noted, data are given for materials in their standard state (at 25 °C [77 °F], 100 kPa). verify (what is ?) Infobox references

Tetradecane is an alkane hydrocarbon with the chemical formula CH_{3}(CH_{2})_{12}CH_{3}.

Tetradecane has 1858 structural isomers.

== See also ==
- Higher alkanes
