= Heptadecane =

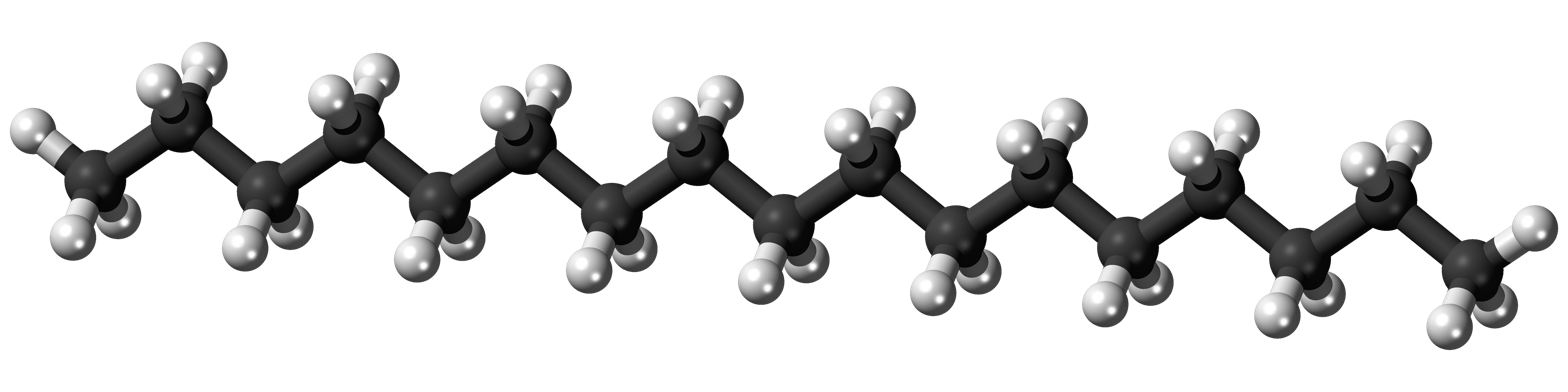

Names
- Preferred IUPAC name Heptadecane
- Other names n-Heptadecane

Identifiers
| CAS Number | 629-78-7 |
| 3D model (JSmol) | Interactive image |
| Beilstein Reference | 1738898 |
| ChEBI | CHEBI:16148 |
| ChemSpider | 11892 |
| ECHA InfoCard | 100.010.100 |
| EC Number | 211-108-4 |
| KEGG | C01816 |
| MeSH | heptadecane |
| PubChem CID | 12398 |
| RTECS number | MI3550000 |
| UNII | H7C0J39XUM |
| CompTox Dashboard (EPA) | DTXSID7047061 |
- InChI: InChI=1S/C17H36/c1-3-5-7-9-11-13-15-17-16-14-12-10-8-6-4-2/h3-17H2,1-2H3 Key: NDJKXXJCMXVBJW-UHFFFAOYSA-N
- SMILES: CCCCCCCCCCCCCCCCC

Properties
| Chemical formula | C_{17}H_{36} |
| Molar mass | 240.475 g·mol^{−1} |
| Appearance | Colorless liquid |
| Odor | Odorless |
| Density | 777 mg mL^{−1} |
| Melting point | 21.1 to 22.9 °C; 69.9 to 73.1 °F; 294.2 to 296.0 K |
| Boiling point | 301.9 °C; 575.3 °F; 575.0 K |
| Vapor pressure | 100 Pa (at 115 °C) |
| Henry's law constant (k_{H}) | 180 nmol Pa^{−1} kg^{−1} |
| Refractive index (n_{D}) | 1.436 |
| Viscosity | 4.21 mPa·s (20 °C) |

Thermochemistry
| Heat capacity (C) | 2.222 J K^{−1} g^{−1} |
| Std molar entropy (S^{⦵}_{298}) | 652.24 J K^{−1} mol^{−1} |
| Std enthalpy of formation (Δ_{f}H^{⦵}_{298}) | −481.9–−477.1 kJ mol^{−1} |
| Std enthalpy of combustion (Δ_{c}H^{⦵}_{298}) | −11.3534–−11.3490 MJ mol^{−1} |

Hazards
- GHS labelling
| Pictograms | (GHS08: Health hazard) |
| Signal word | Danger |
| Hazard statements | H304 |
| Precautionary statements | P301+P310, P331 |
| Flash point | 149 °C (300 °F; 422 K) |

Related compounds
| Related alkanes | Hexadecane; Octadecane |
- Except where otherwise noted, data are given for materials in their standard state (at 25 °C [77 °F], 100 kPa). verify (what is ?) Infobox references

Heptadecane is an organic compound, an alkane hydrocarbon with the chemical formula C_{17}H_{36}. The name may refer to any of 24894 theoretically possible structural isomers, or to a mixture thereof.

The unbranched isomer is normal or n-heptadecane, CH_{3}(CH_{2})_{15}CH_{3}. In the IUPAC nomenclature, the name of this compound is simply heptadecane, since the other isomers are viewed and named as alkyl-substituted versions of smaller alkanes.

The most compact and branched isomer would be tetra-tert-butylmethane, but its existence is believed to be impossible due to steric hindrance. Indeed, it is believed to be the smallest "impossible" alkane.
