= Nonacosane =

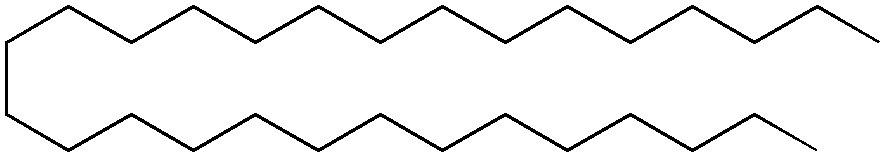
- Skeletal formula of nonacosane

Names
- Preferred IUPAC name Nonacosane

Identifiers
CAS Number	630-03-5
3D model (JSmol)	Interactive image
Beilstein Reference	1724922
ChEBI	CHEBI:7613
ChEMBL	ChEMBL428955
ChemSpider	11903
ECHA InfoCard	100.010.116
EC Number	211-126-2
KEGG	C08384
MeSH	nonacosane
PubChem CID	12409
UNII	IGL1697BK1
CompTox Dashboard (EPA)	DTXSID2060884
- InChI: InChI=1S/C29H60/c1-3-5-7-9-11-13-15-17-19-21-23-25-27-29-28-26-24-22-20-18-16-14-12-10-8-6-4-2/h3-29H2,1-2H3 Key: IGGUPRCHHJZPBS-UHFFFAOYSA-N
- SMILES: CCCCCCCCCCCCCCCCCCCCCCCCCCCCC

Properties
Chemical formula	C_{29}H_{60}
Molar mass	408.799 g·mol^{−1}
Appearance	White, opaque, waxy crystals
Odor	Odorless
Density	0.8083 g cm^{−3}
Melting point	62 to 66 °C; 143 to 151 °F; 335 to 339 K
Boiling point	440.9 °C; 825.5 °F; 714.0 K
log P	15.482

Related compounds
Related alkanes	Tetracosane; Hentriacontane
- Except where otherwise noted, data are given for materials in their standard state (at 25 °C [77 °F], 100 kPa). verify (what is ?) Infobox references

Nonacosane is a straight-chain hydrocarbon with a molecular formula of C_{29}H_{60}, and the structural formula CH_{3}(CH_{2})_{27}CH_{3}. It has 1,590,507,121 constitutional isomers.

Nonacosane occurs naturally and has been reported to be a component of a pheromone of Orgyia leucostigma, and evidence suggests it plays a role in the chemical communication of several insects, including the female Anopheles stephensi (a mosquito).

Nonacosane has been identified within several essential oils. It can also be prepared synthetically.
