= Octadecane =

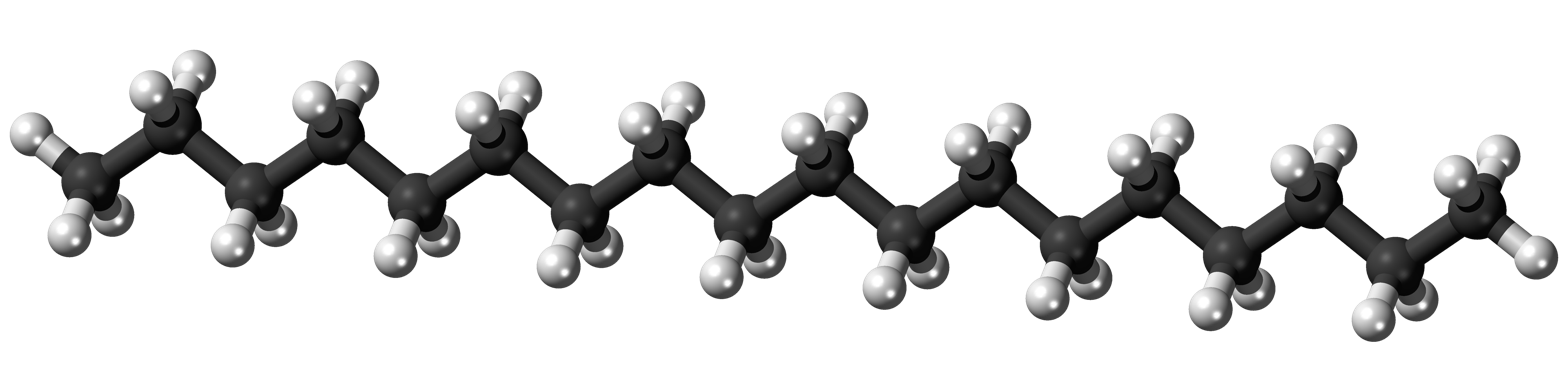

Names
- Preferred IUPAC name Octadecane

Identifiers
CAS Number	593-45-3
3D model (JSmol)	Interactive image
ChEBI	CHEBI:CHEBI:32926
ChemSpider	11145
ECHA InfoCard	100.008.902
EC Number	209-790-3
MeSH	C022883
PubChem CID	11635
UNII	N102P6HAIU
CompTox Dashboard (EPA)	DTXSID9047172
- InChI: InChI=1S/C18H38/c1-3-5-7-9-11-13-15-17-18-16-14-12-10-8-6-4-2/h3-18H2,1-2H3 Key: RZJRJXONCZWCBN-UHFFFAOYSA-N; InChI=1/C18H38/c1-3-5-7-9-11-13-15-17-18-16-14-12-10-8-6-4-2/h3-18H2,1-2H3 Key: RZJRJXONCZWCBN-UHFFFAOYAL
- SMILES: C(CCCCCCCCCCCCCCCC)C

Properties
Chemical formula	C_{18}H_{38}
Molar mass	254.502 g·mol^{−1}
Appearance	White crystals or powder
Odor	Odorless
Density	0.777 g·mL^{−1}
Melting point	28 to 30 °C (82 to 86 °F; 301 to 303 K)
Boiling point	317 °C (603 °F; 590 K)
Vapor pressure	1 mm Hg at 119 °C
Henry's law constant (k_{H})	1.9·10^{−2} atm m^{3} mol^{−1} (est)
Refractive index (n_{D})	1.4390 at 20 °C

Hazards
- GHS labelling
Pictograms	(GHS08: Health hazard)
Signal word	Danger
Hazard statements	H304
Precautionary statements	P301+P316, P331, P405, P501
Flash point	165 °C (329 °F; 438 K)
Autoignition temperature	235 °C (455 °F; 508 K)

Related compounds
Related alkanes	Heptadecane; Nonadecane
- Except where otherwise noted, data are given for materials in their standard state (at 25 °C [77 °F], 100 kPa). Infobox references

Octadecane is an alkane hydrocarbon with the chemical formula C_{18}H_{38} or CH_{3}(CH_{2})_{16}CH_{3}.

== Properties ==
Octadecane is distinguished by being the alkane with the lowest carbon number that is unambiguously solid at room temperature and pressure.
