= C7H16 =

The molecular formula C_{7}H_{16} may refer to:

- Dimethylpentanes
  - 2,2-Dimethylpentane
  - 2,3-Dimethylpentane
  - 2,4-Dimethylpentane
  - 3,3-Dimethylpentane
- 3-Ethylpentane
- Heptane
- Methylhexanes
  - 2-Methylhexane
  - 3-Methylhexane
- 2,2,3-Trimethylbutane
