= Dimethylpentane =

Dimethylpentane may refer to:

- 2,2-Dimethylpentane
- 2,3-Dimethylpentane
- 2,4-Dimethylpentane
- 3,3-Dimethylpentane
