= 2-Methyloctane =

Names
- Preferred IUPAC name 2-Methyloctane

Identifiers
CAS Number	3221-61-2
3D model (JSmol)	Interactive image
Beilstein Reference	1696917
ChEBI	CHEBI:32892
ChEMBL	ChEMBL335900
ChemSpider	7849
ECHA InfoCard	100.019.771
EC Number	203-913-4
Gmelin Reference	240576
MeSH	nonane
PubChem CID	18591
RTECS number	RA6115000
UNII	T9W3VH6G10
UN number	1920
CompTox Dashboard (EPA)	DTXSID30863125
- InChI: InChI=1S/C9H20/c1-3-5-7-9-8-6-4-2/h3-9H2,1-2H3 Key: BKIMMITUMNQMOS-UHFFFAOYSA-N
- SMILES: CCCCCCCCC

Properties
Chemical formula	C_{9}H_{20}
Molar mass	128.259 g·mol^{−1}
Appearance	Colorless liquid
Odor	Gasoline-like
Density	0.718 g/mL
Melting point	−54.1 to −53.1 °C; −65.5 to −63.7 °F; 219.0 to 220.0 K
Boiling point	150.4 to 151.0 °C; 302.6 to 303.7 °F; 423.5 to 424.1 K
log P	5.293
Vapor pressure	0.59 kPa (at 25.0 °C)
Henry's law constant (k_{H})	1.7 nmol Pa^{−1} kg^{−1}
Magnetic susceptibility (χ)	−108.13×10^{−6} cm^{3}/mol
Refractive index (n_{D})	1.405

Thermochemistry
Heat capacity (C)	284.34 J K^{−1} mol^{−1}
Std molar entropy (S^{⦵}_{298})	393.67 J K^{−1} mol^{−1}
Std enthalpy of formation (Δ_{f}H^{⦵}_{298})	−275.7 – −273.7 kJ mol^{−1}
Std enthalpy of combustion (Δ_{c}H^{⦵}_{298})	−6125.75 – −6124.67 kJ mol^{−1}

Hazards
- GHS labelling
Pictograms	(GHS02: Flammable) (GHS07: Exclamation mark) (GHS08: Health hazard)
Signal word	Danger
Hazard statements	H226, H304, H315, H319, H332, H336
Precautionary statements	P261, P301+P310, P305+P351+P338, P331
NFPA 704 (fire diamond)	0 3 0
Flash point	31.0 °C (87.8 °F; 304.1 K)
Autoignition temperature	205.0 °C (401.0 °F; 478.1 K)
Explosive limits	0.87–2.9%
- NIOSH (US health exposure limits)
PEL (Permissible)	none
REL (Recommended)	TWA 200 ppm (1050 mg/m^{3})
IDLH (Immediate danger)	N.D.

Related compounds
Related alkanes	Nonane; 3-Methyloctane
- Except where otherwise noted, data are given for materials in their standard state (at 25 °C [77 °F], 100 kPa). verify (what is ?) Infobox references

2-Methyloctane is a branched alkane hydrocarbon with the chemical formula C_{9}H_{20}. It is a colorless, flammable liquid

== Combustion reactions ==
2-Methyloctane burns in the same way as other alkanes. Where there is enough oxygen, nonane burns to form water and carbon dioxide, so 2-methyloctane would do the same.

C_{9}H_{20} + 14 O_{2} → 9 CO_{2} + 10 H_{2}O

When insufficient oxygen is present for complete combustion, carbon monoxide is produced.

2 C_{9}H_{20} + 19 O_{2} → 18 CO + 20 H_{2}O

== See also ==
- List of isomers of nonane
