= C9H20 =

The molecular formula C_{9}H_{20} (molar mass: 128.25 g/mol, exact mass: 128.1565 u) may refer to:

- Nonane
  - List of isomers of nonane
