= Standard enthalpy of formation =

Change of enthalpy during the formation of a compound from its elements

In chemistry and thermodynamics, the standard enthalpy of formation or standard heat of formation of a compound is the change of enthalpy during the formation of 1 mole of the substance from its constituent elements in their reference state, with all substances in their standard states. The standard pressure value p^{⦵} = 10^{5} Pa (= 100 kPa = 1 bar) is recommended by IUPAC, although prior to 1982 the value 1.00 atm (101.325 kPa) was used. There is no standard temperature. Its symbol is Δ_{f}H^{⦵}. The superscript Plimsoll on this symbol indicates that the process has occurred under standard conditions at the specified temperature (usually 25 °C or 298.15 K).

Standard states are defined for various types of substances. For a gas, it is the hypothetical state the gas would assume if it obeyed the ideal gas equation at a pressure of 1 bar. For a gaseous or solid solute present in a diluted ideal solution, the standard state is the hypothetical state of concentration of the solute of exactly one mole per liter (1 M) at a pressure of 1 bar extrapolated from infinite dilution. For a pure substance or a solvent in a condensed state (a liquid or a solid) the standard state is the pure liquid or solid under a pressure of 1 bar.

For elements that have multiple allotropes, the reference state usually is chosen to be the form in which the element is most stable under 1 bar of pressure. One exception is phosphorus, for which the most stable form at 1 bar is black phosphorus, but white phosphorus is chosen as the standard reference state for zero enthalpy of formation.

For example, the standard enthalpy of formation of carbon dioxide is the enthalpy of the following reaction under the above conditions:

C(s, graphite) + O_{2}(g) → CO_{2}(g)

All elements are written in their standard states, and one mole of product is formed. This is true for all enthalpies of formation.

The standard enthalpy of formation is measured in units of energy per amount of substance, usually stated in kilojoule per mole (kJ mol^{−1}), but also in kilocalorie per mole, joule per mole or kilocalorie per gram (any combination of these units conforming to the energy per mass or amount guideline).

All elements in their reference states (oxygen gas, solid carbon in the form of graphite, etc.) have a standard enthalpy of formation of zero, as there is no change involved in their formation.

The formation reaction is a constant pressure and constant temperature process. Since the pressure of the standard formation reaction is fixed at 1 bar, the standard formation enthalpy or reaction heat is a function of temperature. For tabulation purposes, standard formation enthalpies are all given at a single temperature: 298 K, and are represented by the symbol Δ_{f}H^{⦵}_{298 K}.

== Hess' law ==
For many substances, the formation reaction may be considered as the sum of a number of simpler reactions, either real or fictitious. The enthalpy of reaction can then be analyzed by applying Hess' law, which states that the sum of the enthalpy changes for a number of individual reaction steps equals the enthalpy change of the overall reaction. This is true because enthalpy is a state function, whose value for an overall process depends only on the initial and final states and not on any intermediate states. Examples are given in the following sections.

== Ionic compounds: Born–Haber cycle ==
Standard enthalpy change of formation in Born–Haber diagram for lithium fluoride. The downward arrow "electron affinity" shows the enthalpy of the reaction F(g) + e^{−} → F^{−}(g), although E_{ea} is usually tabulated as positive.

For ionic compounds, the standard enthalpy of formation is equivalent to the sum of several terms included in the Born–Haber cycle. For example, the formation of lithium fluoride,

Li(s) + ½ F_{2}(g) → LiF(s)

may be considered as the sum of several steps, each with its own enthalpy (or energy, approximately):

1. Δ_{at}H^{⦵}(Li), the standard enthalpy of atomization (or sublimation) of solid lithium.
2. E_{i}(Li), the first ionization energy of gaseous lithium.
3. Δ_{at}H^{⦵}(F_{2}), the standard enthalpy of atomization of gaseous fluorine. D(F_{2}), the dissociation enthalpy of F_{2}, is 2 x the standard enthalpy of atomization of F_{2}.
4. E_{ea}(F), the electron affinity of a fluorine atom.
5. Δ_{latt}H^{⦵}(LiF), the lattice energy of lithium fluoride. (U_{L})

The sum of these enthalpies give the standard enthalpy of formation (Δ_{f}H^{⦵}) of lithium fluoride:

Δ_{f}H^{⦵}(LiF) = Δ_{at}H^{⦵}(Li) + E_{i}(Li) + Δ_{at}H^{⦵}(F_{2}) + E_{ea}(F) + Δ_{latt}H^{⦵}(LiF)

In practice, the enthalpy of formation of lithium fluoride can be determined experimentally, but the lattice energy cannot be measured directly. The equation is therefore rearranged to evaluate the lattice energy:

Δ_{latt}H^{⦵}(LiF) = Δ_{at}H^{⦵}(Li) + E_{i}(Li) + Δ_{at}H^{⦵}(F_{2}) + E_{ea}(F) - Δ_{f}H^{⦵}(LiF)

== Organic compounds ==
The formation reactions for most organic compounds are hypothetical. For instance, carbon and hydrogen will not directly react to form methane (CH_{4}), so that the standard enthalpy of formation cannot be measured directly. However the standard enthalpy of combustion is readily measurable using bomb calorimetry. The standard enthalpy of formation is then determined using Hess's law. The combustion of methane:

CH_{4} + 2 O_{2} → CO_{2} + 2 H_{2}O

is equivalent to the sum of the hypothetical decomposition into elements followed by the combustion of the elements to form carbon dioxide (CO_{2}) and water (H_{2}O):

CH_{4} → C + 2 H_{2}
C + O_{2} → CO_{2}
2 H_{2} + O_{2} → 2 H_{2}O

Applying Hess's law,

Δ_{c}H^{⦵}(CH_{4}) = Δ_{f}H^{⦵}(CO_{2}) + 2 Δ_{f}H^{⦵}(H_{2}O) - Δ_{f}H^{⦵}(CH_{4})

Solving for the standard of enthalpy of formation,

Δ_{f}H^{⦵}(CH_{4}) = Δ_{f}H^{⦵}(CO_{2}) + 2 Δ_{f}H^{⦵}(H_{2}O) - Δ_{c}H^{⦵}(CH_{4})

The value of Δ_{f}H^{⦵}(CH_{4}) is determined to be −74.8 kJ/mol. The negative sign shows that the reaction, if it were to proceed, would be exothermic; that is, methane is enthalpically more stable than hydrogen gas and carbon.

It is possible to predict heats of formation for simple unstrained organic compounds with the heat of formation group additivity method.

== Use in calculation for other reactions ==
The standard enthalpy change of any reaction can be calculated from the standard enthalpies of formation of reactants and products using Hess's law. A given reaction is considered as the decomposition of all reactants into elements in their standard states, followed by the formation of all products. The heat of reaction is then minus the sum of the standard enthalpies of formation of the reactants (each being multiplied by its respective stoichiometric coefficient, ν) plus the sum of the standard enthalpies of formation of the products (each also multiplied by its respective stoichiometric coefficient), as shown in the equation below:

Δ_{r}H^{⦵} = Σ νΔ_{r}H^{⦵}(products) - Σ νΔ_{r}H^{⦵}(reactants)

If the standard enthalpy of the products is less than the standard enthalpy of the reactants, the standard enthalpy of reaction is negative. This implies that the reaction is exothermic. The converse is also true; the standard enthalpy of reaction is positive for an endothermic reaction. This calculation has a tacit assumption of ideal solution between reactants and products where the enthalpy of mixing is zero.

For example, for the combustion of methane, CH_{4} + 2 O_{2} → CO_{2} + 2 H_{2}O:

Δ_{r}H^{⦵} = Δ_{f}H^{⦵}(CO_{2}) + 2 Δ_{f}H^{⦵}(H_{2}O) - Δ_{f}H^{⦵}(CH_{4}) + 2 Δ_{f}H^{⦵}(O_{2})

However O_{2} is an element in its standard state, so that Δ_{f}H^{⦵}(O_{2}) = 0, and the heat of reaction is simplified to

Δ_{r}H^{⦵} = Δ_{f}H^{⦵}(CO_{2}) + 2 Δ_{f}H^{⦵}(H_{2}O) - Δ_{f}H^{⦵}(CH_{4})

which is the equation in the previous section for the enthalpy of combustion Δ_{c}H^{⦵}.

== Key concepts for enthalpy calculations ==
- When a reaction is reversed, the magnitude of ΔH stays the same, but the sign changes.
- When the balanced equation for a reaction is multiplied by an integer, the corresponding value of ΔH must be multiplied by that integer as well.
- The change in enthalpy for a reaction can be calculated from the enthalpies of formation of the reactants and the products
- Elements in their standard states make no contribution to the enthalpy calculations for the reaction, since the enthalpy of an element in its standard state is zero. Allotropes of an element other than the standard state generally have non-zero standard enthalpies of formation.

== Examples: standard enthalpies of formation at 25 °C ==
Thermochemical properties of selected substances at 298.15 K and 1 atm

=== Inorganic substances ===
Species	Phase	Chemical formula	Δ_{f}H^{⦵} /(kJ/mol)
Aluminium	Solid	Al	0
Aluminium chloride	Solid	AlCl_{3}	−705.63
Aluminium oxide	Solid	Al_{2}O_{3}	−1675.5
Aluminium hydroxide	Solid	Al(OH)_{3}	−1277
Aluminium sulphate	Solid	Al_{2}(SO_{4})_{3}	−3440
Barium chloride	Solid	BaCl_{2}	−858.6
Barium carbonate	Solid	BaCO_{3}	−1216
Barium hydroxide	Solid	Ba(OH)_{2}	−944.7
Barium oxide	Solid	BaO	−548.1
Barium sulfate	Solid	BaSO_{4}	−1473.3
Beryllium	Solid	Be	0
Beryllium hydroxide	Solid	Be(OH)_{2}	−903
Beryllium oxide	Solid	BeO	−609.4
Boron trichloride	Solid	BCl_{3}	−402.96
Bromine	Liquid	Br_{2}	0
Bromide ion	Aqueous	Br^{−}	−121
Bromine	Gas	Br	111.884
Bromine	Gas	Br_{2}	30.91
Bromine trifluoride	Gas	BrF_{3}	−255.60
Hydrogen bromide	Gas	HBr	−36.29
Cadmium	Solid	Cd	0
Cadmium oxide	Solid	CdO	−258
Cadmium hydroxide	Solid	Cd(OH)_{2}	−561
Cadmium sulfide	Solid	CdS	−162
Cadmium sulfate	Solid	CdSO_{4}	−935
Caesium	Solid	Cs	0
Caesium	Gas	Cs	76.50
Caesium	Liquid	Cs	2.09
Caesium(I) ion	Gas	Cs^{+}	457.964
Caesium chloride	Solid	CsCl	−443.04
Calcium	Solid	Ca	0
Calcium	Gas	Ca	178.2
Calcium(II) ion	Gas	Ca^{2+}	1925.90
Calcium(II) ion	Aqueous	Ca^{2+}	−542.7
Calcium carbide	Solid	CaC_{2}	−59.8
Calcium carbonate (Calcite)	Solid	CaCO_{3}	−1206.9
Calcium chloride	Solid	CaCl_{2}	−795.8
Calcium chloride	Aqueous	CaCl_{2}	−877.3
Calcium phosphate	Solid	Ca_{3}(PO_{4})_{2}	−4132
Calcium fluoride	Solid	CaF_{2}	−1219.6
Calcium hydride	Solid	CaH_{2}	−186.2
Calcium hydroxide	Solid	Ca(OH)_{2}	−986.09
Calcium hydroxide	Aqueous	Ca(OH)_{2}	−1002.82
Calcium oxide	Solid	CaO	−635.09
Calcium sulfate	Solid	CaSO_{4}	−1434.52
Calcium sulfide	Solid	CaS	−482.4
Wollastonite	Solid	CaSiO_{3}	−1630
Carbon (Graphite)	Solid	C	0
Carbon (Diamond)	Solid	C	1.9
Carbon	Gas	C	716.67
Carbon dioxide	Gas	CO_{2}	−393.509
Carbon disulfide	Liquid	CS_{2}	89.41
Carbon disulfide	Gas	CS_{2}	116.7
Carbon monoxide	Gas	CO	−110.525
Carbonyl chloride (Phosgene)	Gas	COCl_{2}	−218.8
Carbon dioxide (un–ionized)	Aqueous	CO_{2}(aq)	−419.26
Bicarbonate ion	Aqueous	HCO_{3}^{–}	−689.93
Carbonate ion	Aqueous	CO_{3}^{2–}	−675.23
Monatomic chlorine	Gas	Cl	121.7
Chloride ion	Aqueous	Cl^{−}	−167.2
Chlorine	Gas	Cl_{2}	0
Chromium	Solid	Cr	0
Copper	Solid	Cu	0
Copper(II) bromide	Solid	CuBr2	−138.490
Copper(II) chloride	Solid	CuCl2	−217.986
Copper(II) oxide	Solid	CuO	−155.2
Copper(II) sulfate	Aqueous	CuSO_{4}	−769.98
Fluorine	Gas	F_{2}	0
Monatomic hydrogen	Gas	H	218
Hydrogen	Gas	H_{2}	0
Water	Gas	H_{2}O	−241.818
Water	Liquid	H_{2}O	−285.8
Hydrogen ion	Aqueous	H^{+}	0
Hydroxide ion	Aqueous	OH^{−}	−230
Hydrogen peroxide	Liquid	H_{2}O_{2}	−187.8
Phosphoric acid	Liquid	H_{3}PO_{4}	−1288
Hydrogen cyanide	Gas	HCN	130.5
Hydrogen bromide	Liquid	HBr	−36.3
Hydrogen chloride	Gas	HCl	−92.30
Hydrogen chloride	Aqueous	HCl	−167.2
Hydrogen fluoride	Gas	HF	−273.3
Hydrogen iodide	Gas	HI	26.5
Iodine	Solid	I_{2}	0
Iodine	Gas	I_{2}	62.438
Iodine	Aqueous	I_{2}	23
Iodide ion	Aqueous	I^{−}	−55
Iron	Solid	Fe	0
Iron carbide (Cementite)	Solid	Fe_{3}C	5.4
Iron(II) carbonate (Siderite)	Solid	FeCO_{3}	−750.6
Iron(III) chloride	Solid	FeCl_{3}	−399.4
Iron(II) oxide (Wüstite)	Solid	FeO	−272
Iron(II,III) oxide (Magnetite)	Solid	Fe_{3}O_{4}	−1118.4
Iron(III) oxide (Hematite)	Solid	Fe_{2}O_{3}	−824.2
Iron(II) sulfate	Solid	FeSO_{4}	−929
Iron(III) sulfate	Solid	Fe_{2}(SO_{4})_{3}	−2583
Iron(II) sulfide	Solid	FeS	−102
Pyrite	Solid	FeS_{2}	−178
Lead	Solid	Pb	0
Lead dioxide	Solid	PbO_{2}	−277
Lead sulfide	Solid	PbS	−100
Lead sulfate	Solid	PbSO_{4}	−920
Lead(II) nitrate	Solid	Pb(NO_{3})_{2}	−452
Lead(II) sulfate	Solid	PbSO_{4}	−920
Lithium fluoride	Solid	LiF	−616.93
Magnesium	Solid	Mg	0
Magnesium ion	Aqueous	Mg^{2+}	−466.85
Magnesium carbonate	Solid	MgCO_{3}	−1095.797
Magnesium chloride	Solid	MgCl_{2}	−641.8
Magnesium hydroxide	Solid	Mg(OH)_{2}	−924.54
Magnesium hydroxide	Aqueous	Mg(OH)_{2}	−926.8
Magnesium oxide	Solid	MgO	−601.6
Magnesium sulfate	Solid	MgSO_{4}	−1278.2
Manganese	Solid	Mn	0
Manganese(II) oxide	Solid	MnO	−384.9
Manganese(IV) oxide	Solid	MnO_{2}	−519.7
Manganese(III) oxide	Solid	Mn_{2}O_{3}	−971
Manganese(II,III) oxide	Solid	Mn_{3}O_{4}	−1387
Permanganate	Aqueous	MnO^{−}_{4}	−543
Mercury(II) oxide (red)	Solid	HgO	−90.83
Mercury sulfide (red, cinnabar)	Solid	HgS	−58.2
Nitrogen	Gas	N_{2}	0
Ammonia (ammonium hydroxide)	Aqueous	NH_{3} (NH_{4}OH)	−80.8
Ammonia	Gas	NH_{3}	−46.1
Ammonium nitrate	Solid	NH_{4}NO_{3}	−365.6
Ammonium chloride	Solid	NH_{4}Cl	−314.55
Nitrogen dioxide	Gas	NO_{2}	33.2
Hydrazine	Gas	N_{2}H_{4}	95.4
Hydrazine	Liquid	N_{2}H_{4}	50.6
Nitrous oxide	Gas	N_{2}O	82.05
Nitric oxide	Gas	NO	90.29
Dinitrogen tetroxide	Gas	N_{2}O_{4}	9.16
Dinitrogen pentoxide	Solid	N_{2}O_{5}	−43.1
Dinitrogen pentoxide	Gas	N_{2}O_{5}	11.3
Nitric acid	Aqueous	HNO_{3}	−207
Monatomic oxygen	Gas	O	249
Oxygen	Gas	O_{2}	0
Ozone	Gas	O_{3}	143
White phosphorus	Solid	P_{4}	0
Red phosphorus	Solid	P	−17.4
Black phosphorus	Solid	P	−39.3
Phosphorus trichloride	Liquid	PCl_{3}	−319.7
Phosphorus trichloride	Gas	PCl_{3}	−278
Phosphorus pentachloride	Solid	PCl_{5}	−440
Phosphorus pentachloride	Gas	PCl_{5}	−321
Phosphorus pentoxide	Solid	P_{2}O_{5}	−1505.5
Potassium bromide	Solid	KBr	−392.2
Potassium carbonate	Solid	K_{2}CO_{3}	−1150
Potassium chlorate	Solid	KClO_{3}	−391.4
Potassium chloride	Solid	KCl	−436.68
Potassium fluoride	Solid	KF	−562.6
Potassium oxide	Solid	K_{2}O	−363
Potassium nitrate	Solid	KNO_{3}	−494.5
Potassium perchlorate	Solid	KClO_{4}	−430.12
Silicon	Gas	Si	368.2
Silicon carbide	Solid	SiC	−74.4, −71.5
Silicon tetrachloride	Liquid	SiCl_{4}	−640.1
Silica (Quartz)	Solid	SiO_{2}	−910.86
Silver bromide	Solid	AgBr	−99.5
Silver chloride	Solid	AgCl	−127.01
Silver iodide	Solid	AgI	−62.4
Silver oxide	Solid	Ag_{2}O	−31.1
Silver sulfide	Solid	Ag_{2}S	−31.8
Sodium	Solid	Na	0
Sodium	Gas	Na	107.5
Sodium bicarbonate	Solid	NaHCO_{3}	−950.8
Sodium carbonate	Solid	Na_{2}CO_{3}	−1130.77
Sodium chloride	Aqueous	NaCl	−407.27
Sodium chloride	Solid	NaCl	−411.12
Sodium chloride	Liquid	NaCl	−385.92
Sodium chloride	Gas	NaCl	−181.42
Sodium chlorate	Solid	NaClO_{3}	−365.4
Sodium fluoride	Solid	NaF	−569.0
Sodium hydroxide	Aqueous	NaOH	−469.15
Sodium hydroxide	Solid	NaOH	−425.93
Sodium hypochlorite	Solid	NaOCl	−347.1
Sodium nitrate	Aqueous	NaNO_{3}	−446.2
Sodium nitrate	Solid	NaNO_{3}	−424.8
Sodium oxide	Solid	Na_{2}O	−414.2
Sulfur (monoclinic)	Solid	S_{8}	0.3
Sulfur (rhombic)	Solid	S_{8}	0
Hydrogen sulfide	Gas	H_{2}S	−20.63
Sulfur dioxide	Gas	SO_{2}	−296.84
Sulfur trioxide	Gas	SO_{3}	−395.7
Sulfuric acid	Liquid	H_{2}SO_{4}	−814
Titanium	Gas	Ti	468
Titanium tetrachloride	Gas	TiCl_{4}	−763.2
Titanium tetrachloride	Liquid	TiCl_{4}	−804.2
Titanium dioxide	Solid	TiO_{2}	−944.7
Zinc	Gas	Zn	130.7
Zinc chloride	Solid	ZnCl_{2}	−415.1
Zinc oxide	Solid	ZnO	−348.0
Zinc sulfate	Solid	ZnSO_{4}	−980.14

=== Aliphatic hydrocarbons ===
Formula	Name	Δ_{f}H^{⦵} /(kcal/mol)	Δ_{f}H^{⦵} /(kJ/mol)
Straight-chain
CH_{4}	Methane	−17.9	−74.9
C_{2}H_{6}	Ethane	−20.0	−83.7
C_{2}H_{4}	Ethylene	12.5	52.5
C_{2}H_{2}	Acetylene	54.2	226.8
C_{3}H_{8}	Propane	−25.0	−104.6
C_{4}H_{10}	n-Butane	−30.0	−125.5
C_{5}H_{12}	n-Pentane	−35.1	−146.9
C_{6}H_{14}	n-Hexane	−40.0	−167.4
C_{7}H_{16}	n-Heptane	−44.9	−187.9
C_{8}H_{18}	n-Octane	−49.8	−208.4
C_{9}H_{20}	n-Nonane	−54.8	−229.3
C_{10}H_{22}	n-Decane	−59.6	−249.4
C_{4} Alkane branched isomers
C_{4}H_{10}	Isobutane (methylpropane)	−32.1	−134.3
C_{5} Alkane branched isomers
C_{5}H_{12}	Neopentane (dimethylpropane)	−40.1	−167.8
C_{5}H_{12}	Isopentane (methylbutane)	−36.9	−154.4
C_{6} Alkane branched isomers
C_{6}H_{14}	2,2-Dimethylbutane	−44.5	−186.2
C_{6}H_{14}	2,3-Dimethylbutane	−42.5	−177.8
C_{6}H_{14}	2-Methylpentane (isohexane)	−41.8	−174.9
C_{6}H_{14}	3-Methylpentane	−41.1	−172.0
C_{7} Alkane branched isomers
C_{7}H_{16}	2,2-Dimethylpentane	−49.2	−205.9
C_{7}H_{16}	2,2,3-Trimethylbutane	−49.0	−205.0
C_{7}H_{16}	3,3-Dimethylpentane	−48.1	−201.3
C_{7}H_{16}	2,3-Dimethylpentane	−47.3	−197.9
C_{7}H_{16}	2,4-Dimethylpentane	−48.2	−201.7
C_{7}H_{16}	2-Methylhexane	−46.5	−194.6
C_{7}H_{16}	3-Methylhexane	−45.7	−191.2
C_{7}H_{16}	3-Ethylpentane	−45.3	−189.5
C_{8} Alkane branched isomers
C_{8}H_{18}	2,3-Dimethylhexane	−55.1	−230.5
C_{8}H_{18}	2,2,3,3-Tetramethylbutane	−53.9	−225.5
C_{8}H_{18}	2,2-Dimethylhexane	−53.7	−224.7
C_{8}H_{18}	2,2,4-Trimethylpentane (isooctane)	−53.5	−223.8
C_{8}H_{18}	2,5-Dimethylhexane	−53.2	−222.6
C_{8}H_{18}	2,2,3-Trimethylpentane	−52.6	−220.1
C_{8}H_{18}	3,3-Dimethylhexane	−52.6	−220.1
C_{8}H_{18}	2,4-Dimethylhexane	−52.4	−219.2
C_{8}H_{18}	2,3,4-Trimethylpentane	−51.9	−217.1
C_{8}H_{18}	2,3,3-Trimethylpentane	−51.7	−216.3
C_{8}H_{18}	2-Methylheptane	−51.5	−215.5
C_{8}H_{18}	3-Ethyl-3-Methylpentane	−51.4	−215.1
C_{8}H_{18}	3,4-Dimethylhexane	−50.9	−213.0
C_{8}H_{18}	3-Ethyl-2-Methylpentane	−50.4	−210.9
C_{8}H_{18}	3-Methylheptane	−60.3	−252.5
C_{8}H_{18}	4-Methylheptane	?	?
C_{8}H_{18}	3-Ethylhexane	?	?
C_{9} Alkane branched isomers (selected)
C_{9}H_{20}	2,2,4,4-Tetramethylpentane	−57.8	−241.8
C_{9}H_{20}	2,2,3,3-Tetramethylpentane	−56.7	−237.2
C_{9}H_{20}	2,2,3,4-Tetramethylpentane	−56.6	−236.8
C_{9}H_{20}	2,3,3,4-Tetramethylpentane	−56.4	−236.0
C_{9}H_{20}	3,3-Diethylpentane	−55.7	−233.0

=== Other organic compounds ===
Species	Phase	Chemical formula	Δ_{f}H^{⦵} /(kJ/mol)
Acetone	Liquid	C_{3}H_{6}O	−248.4
Benzene	Liquid	C_{6}H_{6}	48.95
Benzoic acid	Solid	C_{7}H_{6}O_{2}	−385.2
Carbon tetrachloride	Liquid	CCl_{4}	−135.4
Carbon tetrachloride	Gas	CCl_{4}	−95.98
Ethanol	Liquid	C_{2}H_{5}OH	−277.0
Ethanol	Gas	C_{2}H_{5}OH	−235.3
Glucose	Solid	C_{6}H_{12}O_{6}	−1271
Isopropanol	Gas	C_{3}H_{7}OH	−318.1
Methanol (methyl alcohol)	Liquid	CH_{3}OH	−238.4
Methanol (methyl alcohol)	Gas	CH_{3}OH	−201.0
Methyl linoleate (Biodiesel)	Gas	C_{19}H_{34}O_{2}	−356.3
Sucrose	Solid	C_{12}H_{22}O_{11}	−2226.1
Trichloromethane (Chloroform)	Liquid	CHCl_{3}	−134.47
Trichloromethane (Chloroform)	Gas	CHCl_{3}	−103.18
Vinyl chloride	Solid	C_{2}H_{3}Cl	−94.12

== See also ==
- Calorimetry
- Thermochemistry
