= Bestine =

Bestine may refer to:

- Bestine, a brand name for a rubber cement solvent containing heptane
- Bestine, a township on the fictional planet Tatooine in the Star Wars universe
