= Alkane =

Type of saturated hydrocarbon compound

Chemical structure of methane, the simplest alkane

In organic chemistry, an alkane, or paraffin (a historical trivial name that also has other meanings), is an acyclic saturated hydrocarbon. In other words, an alkane consists of hydrogen and carbon atoms arranged in a tree structure in which all the carbon–carbon bonds are single. Alkanes have the general chemical formula C_{n}H_{2n+2} and therefore range in complexity from the simplest case of methane (CH_{4}), where n = 1, to arbitrarily large and complex molecules, like hexacontane (C_{60}H_{122}) or 4-methyl-5-(1-methylethyl) octane, an isomer of dodecane (C_{12}H_{26}).

The International Union of Pure and Applied Chemistry (IUPAC) defines alkanes as "acyclic branched or unbranched hydrocarbons having the general formula C_{n}H_{2n+2}, and therefore consisting entirely of hydrogen atoms and saturated carbon atoms". However, some sources use the term to denote any saturated hydrocarbon, including those that are either monocyclic (i.e. the cycloalkanes) or polycyclic, despite them having a distinct general formula (e.g. cycloalkanes are C_{n}H_{2n}).

In an alkane, each carbon atom is sp^{3}-hybridized with 4 sigma bonds (either C–C or C–H), and each hydrogen atom is joined to one of the carbon atoms (in a C–H bond). The longest series of linked carbon atoms in a molecule is known as its carbon skeleton or carbon backbone. The number of carbon atoms may be considered as the size of the alkane.

One group of the higher alkanes are waxes, solids at standard ambient temperature and pressure (SATP), for which the number of carbon atoms in the carbon backbone is greater than about 17. With their repeated –CH_{2} units, the alkanes constitute a homologous series of organic compounds in which the members differ in molecular mass by multiples of 14.03 u (the total mass of each such methylene bridge unit, which comprises a single carbon atom of mass 12.01 u and two hydrogen atoms of mass ~1.01 u each).

Methane is produced by methanogenic archaea and some long-chain alkanes function as pheromones in certain animal species or as protective waxes in plants and fungi. Nevertheless, most alkanes do not have much biological activity. They can be viewed as molecular trees upon which can be hung the more active/reactive functional groups of biological molecules.

The alkanes have two main commercial sources: petroleum (crude oil) and natural gas.

An alkyl group is an alkane-based molecular fragment that bears one open valence for bonding. They are generally abbreviated with the symbol for any organyl group, R, although Alk is sometimes used to specifically symbolize an alkyl group (as opposed to an alkenyl group or aryl group).

== Structure and classification ==
Ordinarily, the C–C single bond distance is 1.53 ångströms (1.53×10^{−10} m). Saturated hydrocarbons can be linear, branched, or cyclic. The third group is sometimes called cycloalkanes. Very complicated structures are possible by combining linear, branched, cyclic alkanes.

== Isomerism ==
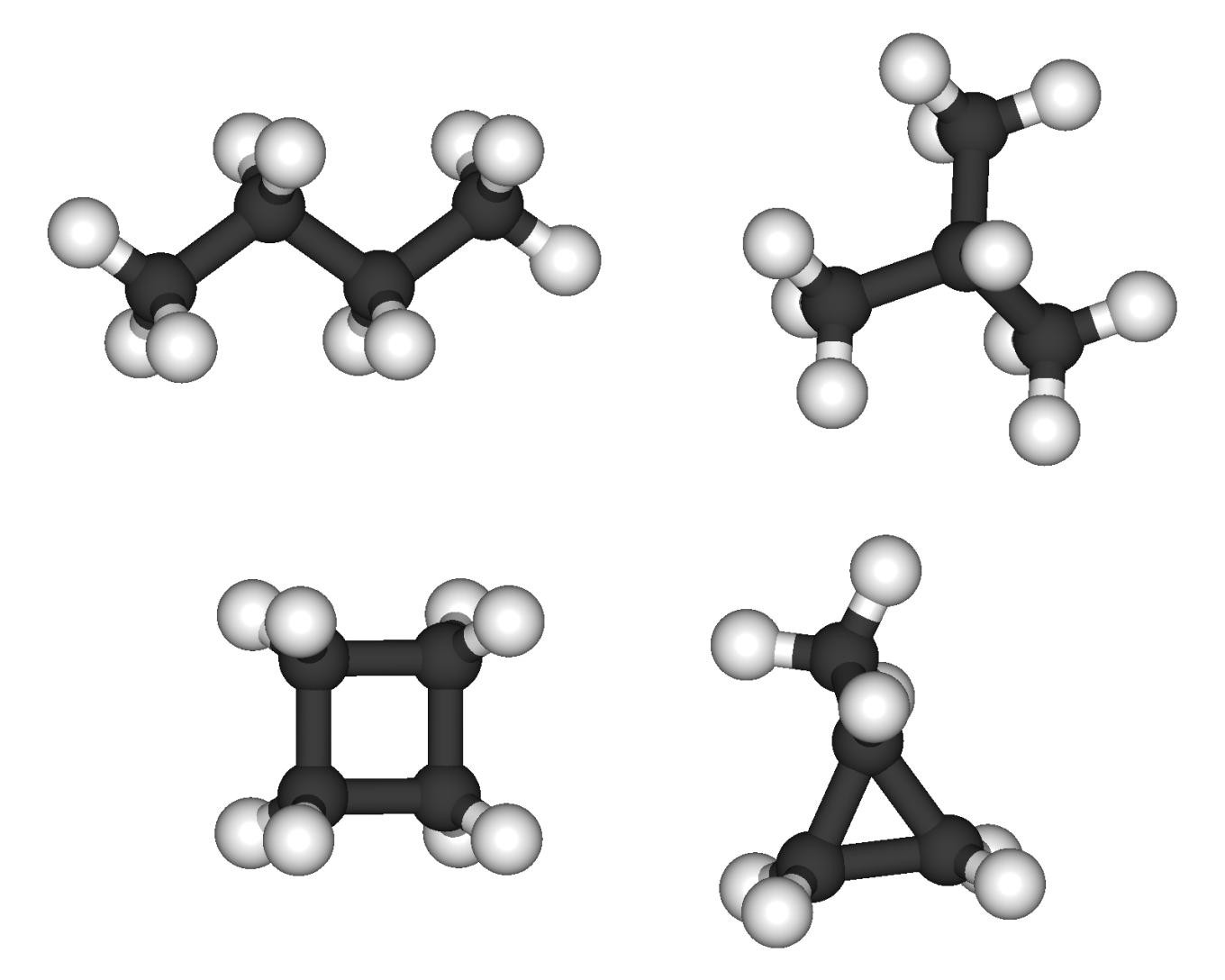
C_{4} alkanes and cycloalkanes (left to right): n-butane and isobutane are the two C_{4}H_{10} isomers; cyclobutane and methylcyclopropane are the two C_{4}H_{8} isomers.

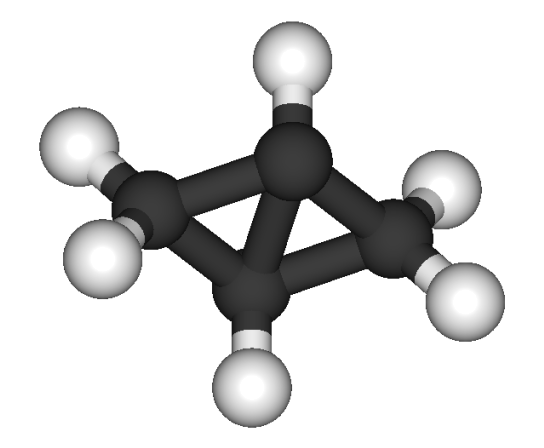
Bicyclo[1.1.0]butane is the only C_{4}H_{6} alkane and has no alkane isomer.

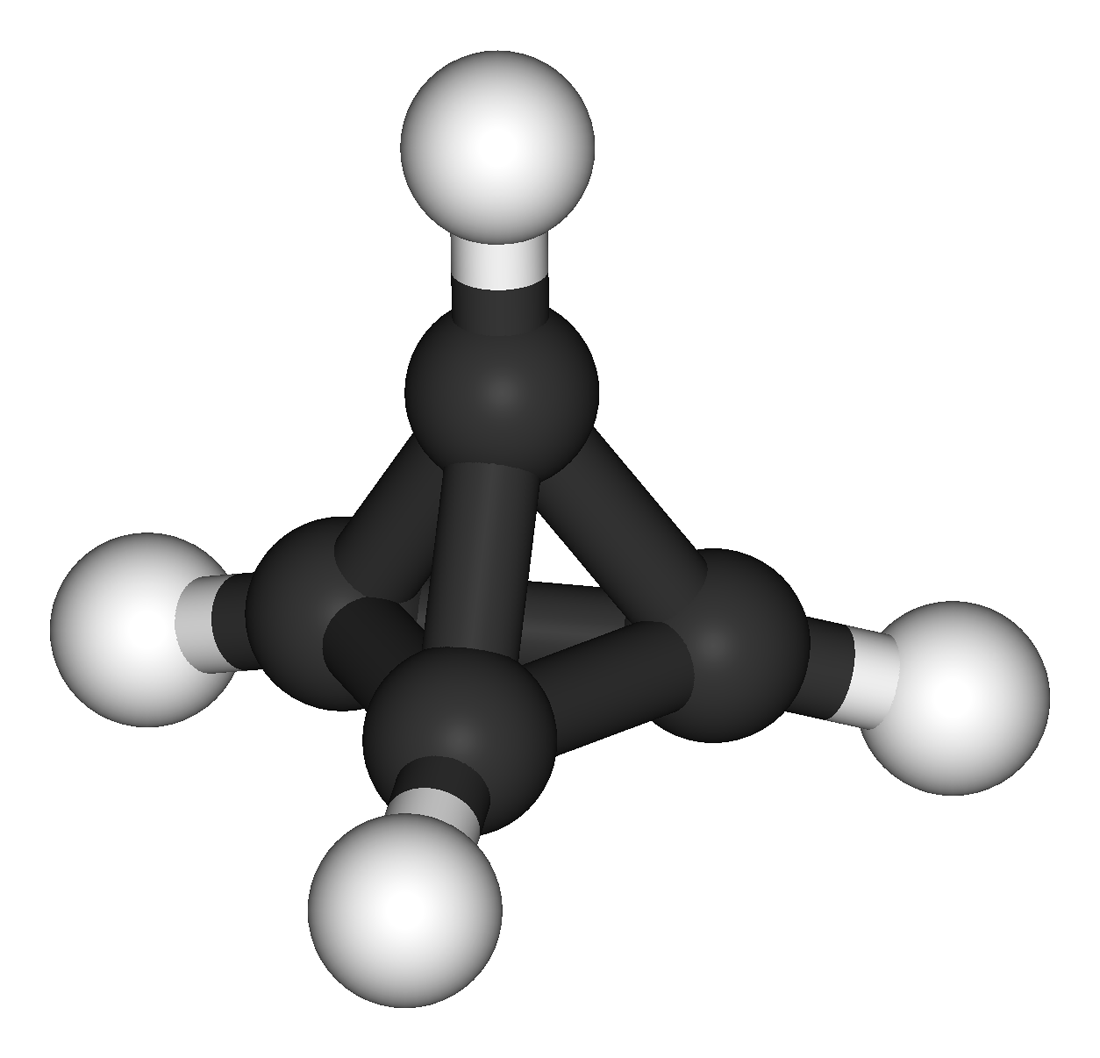
Tetrahedrane is the only C_{4}H_{4} alkane and also has no alkane isomer.

Alkanes with more than three carbon atoms can be arranged in various ways, forming structural isomers. The simplest isomer of an alkane is the one in which the carbon atoms are arranged in a single chain with no branches. This isomer is sometimes called the n-isomer (n for "normal", although it is not necessarily the most common). However, the chain of carbon atoms may also be branched at one or more points. The number of possible isomers increases rapidly with the number of carbon atoms. For example, for acyclic alkanes:

- C_{1}: methane only
- C_{2}: ethane only
- C_{3}: propane only
- C_{4}: 2 isomers: n-butane and isobutane (i-butane)
- C_{5}: 3 isomers: n-pentane, isopentane, and neopentane
- C_{6}: 5 isomers: n-hexane, 2-methylpentane (isohexane), 3-methylpentane, 2,2-dimethylbutane (neohexane), and 2,3-dimethylbutane
- C_{7}: 9 isomers: n-heptane, 2-methylhexane (isoheptane), 3-methylhexane, 2,2-dimethylpentane (neoheptane), 2,3-dimethylpentane, 2,4-dimethylpentane, 3,3-dimethylpentane, 3-ethylpentane, 2,2,3-trimethylbutane
- C_{8}: 18 isomers: octane, 2-methylheptane, 3-methylheptane, 4-methylheptane, 2,2-dimethylhexane, 2,3-dimethylhexane, 2,4-dimethylhexane, 2,5-dimethylhexane, 3,3-dimethylhexane, 3,4-dimethylhexane, 3-ethylhexane, 2,2,3-trimethylpentane, 2,2,4-trimethylpentane, 2,3,3-trimethylpentane, 2,3,4-trimethylpentane, 3-ethyl-2-methylpentane, 3-ethyl-3-methylpentane, 2,2,3,3-tetramethylbutane
- C_{9}: 35 isomers of nonane
- C_{10}: 75 isomers of decane
- C_{11}: 159 isomers of undecane
- C_{12}: 355 isomers of dodecane
- C_{20}: 366,319 isomers of eicosane (icosane)
- C_{30}: 4,111,846,763 isomers of triacontane
- C_{40}: 62,481,801,147,341 isomers of tetracontane
- C_{50}: 1,117,743,651,746,953,270 isomers of pentacontane
- C_{60}: 22,158,734,535,770,411,074,184 isomers of hexacontane

Branched alkanes can be chiral. For example, 3-methylhexane and its higher homologues are chiral due to their stereogenic center at carbon atom number 3. The above list only includes differences of connectivity, not stereochemistry. In addition to the alkane isomers, the chain of carbon atoms may form one or more rings. Such compounds are called cycloalkanes, and are also excluded from the above list because changing the number of rings changes the molecular formula. For example, cyclobutane and methylcyclopropane are isomers of each other (C_{4}H_{8}), but are not isomers of butane (C_{4}H_{10}).

Branched alkanes are more thermodynamically stable than their linear (or less branched) isomers. For example, the highly branched 2,2,3,3-tetramethylbutane is about 1.9 kcal/mol more stable than its linear isomer, n-octane.

== Nomenclature ==
The IUPAC nomenclature (systematic way of naming compounds) for alkanes is based on identifying hydrocarbon chains. Unbranched, saturated hydrocarbon chains are named systematically with a Greek numerical prefix denoting the number of carbons and the suffix "-ane".

In 1866, August Wilhelm von Hofmann suggested systematizing nomenclature by using the whole sequence of vowels a, e, i, o and u to create suffixes -ane, -ene, -ine (or -yne), -one, -une, for the hydrocarbons C_{n}H_{2n+2}, C_{n}H_{2n}, C_{n}H_{2n−2}, C_{n}H_{2n−4}, C_{n}H_{2n−6}. In modern nomenclature, the first three specifically name hydrocarbons with single, double and triple bonds; while "-one" now represents a ketone.

=== Linear alkanes ===
Straight-chain alkanes are sometimes indicated by the prefix n- (for "normal") where a non-linear isomer exists. Although this is not strictly necessary and is not part of the IUPAC naming system, the usage is still common in cases where one wishes to emphasize or distinguish between the straight-chain and branched-chain isomers, e.g., "n-butane" rather than simply "butane" to differentiate it from isobutane. Alternative names for this group used in the petroleum industry are linear paraffins or n-paraffins.

The first eight members of the series (in terms of number of carbon atoms) are named as follows:

methane
CH_{4} – one carbon and 4 hydrogen
ethane
C_{2}H_{6} – two carbon and 6 hydrogen
propane
C_{3}H_{8} – three carbon and 8 hydrogen
butane
C_{4}H_{10} – four carbon and 10 hydrogen
pentane
C_{5}H_{12} – five carbon and 12 hydrogen
hexane
C_{6}H_{14} – six carbon and 14 hydrogen
heptane
C_{7}H_{16} – seven carbons and 16 hydrogen
octane
C_{8}H_{18} – eight carbons and 18 hydrogen

The first four names were derived from methanol, ether, propionic acid and butyric acid. Alkanes with five or more carbon atoms are named by adding the suffix -ane to the appropriate numerical multiplier prefix with elision of any terminal vowel (-a or -o) from the basic numerical term. Hence, pentane, C_{5}H_{12}; hexane, C_{6}H_{14}; heptane, C_{7}H_{16}; octane, C_{8}H_{18}; etc. The numeral prefix is generally Greek; however, alkanes with a carbon atom count ending in nine, for example nonane, use the Latin prefix non-.

=== Branched alkanes ===
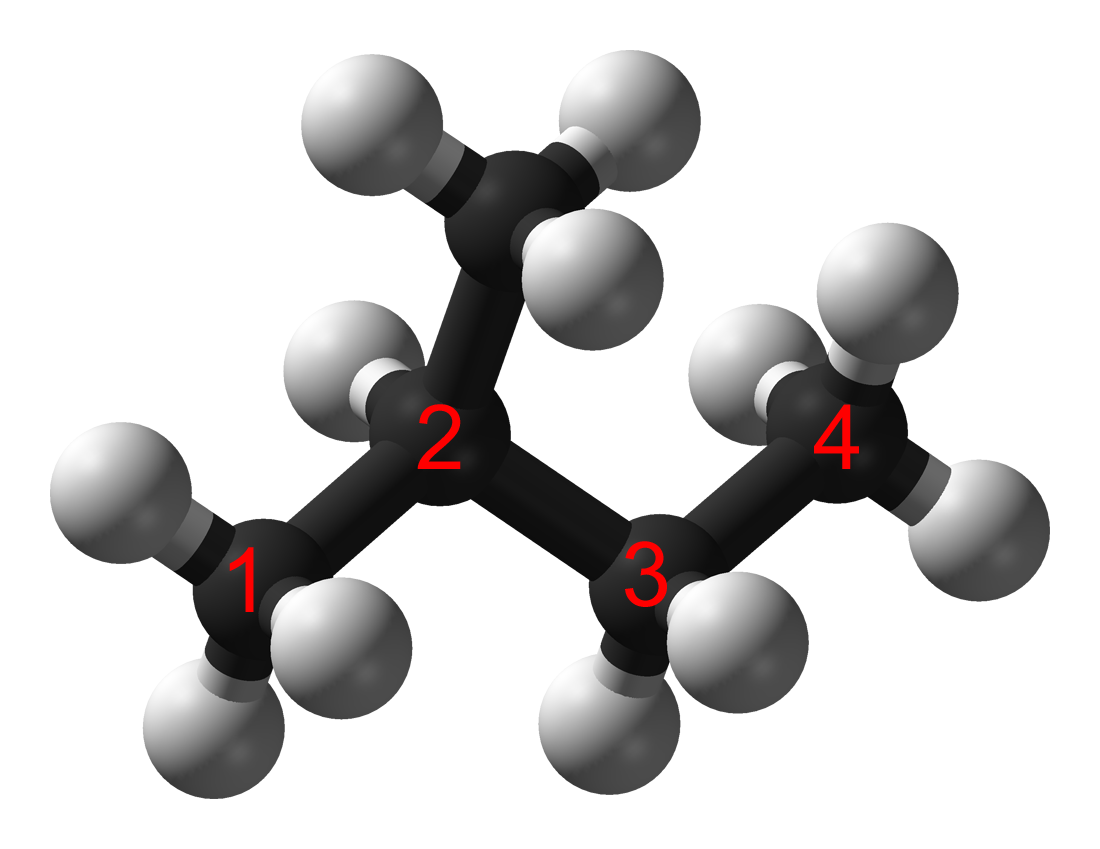
Ball-and-stick model of isopentane (common name) or 2-methylbutane (IUPAC systematic name)

Simple branched alkanes often have a common name using a prefix to distinguish them from linear alkanes, for example n-butane, isobutane (or i-butane) for the two isomers of butane and n-pentane, isopentane, neopentane for the three isomers of pentane.

IUPAC naming conventions can be used to produce a systematic name.

The key steps in the naming of more complicated branched alkanes are as follows:

- Identify the longest continuous chain of carbon atoms.
- Name this longest root chain using standard naming rules.
- Name each side chain by changing the suffix of the name of the alkane from "-ane" to "-yl".
- Number the longest continuous chain in order to give the lowest possible numbers for the side-chains.
- Number and name the side chains before the name of the root chain.
- If there are multiple side chains of the same type, use prefixes such as "di-" and "tri-" to indicate it as such, and number each one.
- Add side chain names in alphabetical (disregarding "di-" etc. prefixes) order in front of the name of the root chain.

Comparison of nomenclatures for three isomers of C_{5}H_{12}
Common name	n-pentane	isopentane	neopentane
IUPAC name	pentane	2-methylbutane	2,2-dimethylpropane
Structure			

=== Saturated cyclic hydrocarbons ===
Though technically distinct from the alkanes, this class of hydrocarbons is referred to by some as the "cyclic alkanes." As their description implies, they contain one or more rings.

Simple cycloalkanes have a prefix "cyclo-" to distinguish them from alkanes. Cycloalkanes are named as per their acyclic counterparts with respect to the number of carbon atoms in their backbones, e.g., cyclopentane (C_{5}H_{10}) is a cycloalkane with 5 carbon atoms just like pentane (C_{5}H_{12}), but they are joined up in a five-membered ring. In a similar manner, propane and cyclopropane, butane and cyclobutane, etc.

Substituted cycloalkanes are named similarly to substituted alkanes – the cycloalkane ring is stated, and the substituents are according to their position on the ring, with the numbering decided by the Cahn–Ingold–Prelog priority rules.

=== Trivial/common names ===
The trivial (non-systematic) name for alkanes is "paraffins". Together, alkanes are known as the "paraffin series". Trivial names for compounds are usually historical artifacts. They were coined before the development of systematic names, and have been retained due to familiar usage in industry. Cycloalkanes are also called naphthenes.

Branched-chain alkanes are called isoparaffins. "Paraffin" is a general term and often does not distinguish between pure compounds and mixtures of isomers, i.e., compounds of the same chemical formula, e.g., pentane and isopentane.

In IUPAC

The following trivial names are retained in the IUPAC system:

- isobutane for 2-methylpropane
- isopentane for 2-methylbutane
- neopentane for 2,2-dimethylpropane.

Non-IUPAC

Some non-IUPAC trivial names are occasionally used:

- cetane, for hexadecane
- cerane, for hexacosane

== Physical properties ==
All alkanes are colorless. Alkanes with the lowest molecular weights are gases, those of intermediate molecular weight are liquids, and the heaviest are waxy solids.

=== Table of alkanes ===
Alkane	Formula	Boiling point (Note: Physical properties of the straight-chain isomer) [°C]	Melting point [°C]	Density [kg/m^{3}] (at 20 °C)	Isomers (Note: Total number of constitutional isomers for this molecular formula)
Methane	CH_{4}	−162	−182	0.656 (gas)	1
Ethane	C_{2}H_{6}	−89	−183	1.26 (gas)	1
Propane	C_{3}H_{8}	−42	−188	2.01 (gas)	1
Butane	C_{4}H_{10}	0	−138	2.48 (gas)	2
Pentane	C_{5}H_{12}	36	−130	626 (liquid)	3
Hexane	C_{6}H_{14}	69	−95	659 (liquid)	5
Heptane	C_{7}H_{16}	98	−91	684 (liquid)	9
Octane	C_{8}H_{18}	126	−57	703 (liquid)	18
Nonane	C_{9}H_{20}	151	−54	718 (liquid)	35
Decane	C_{10}H_{22}	174	−30	730 (liquid)	75
Undecane	C_{11}H_{24}	196	−26	740 (liquid)	159
Dodecane	C_{12}H_{26}	216	−10	749 (liquid)	355
Tridecane	C_{13}H_{28}	235	−5.4	756 (liquid)	802
Tetradecane	C_{14}H_{30}	253	5.9	763 (liquid)	1858
Pentadecane	C_{15}H_{32}	270	10	769 (liquid)	4347
Hexadecane	C_{16}H_{34}	287	18	773 (liquid)	10,359
Heptadecane	C_{17}H_{36}	303	22	777 (solid)	24,894
Octadecane	C_{18}H_{38}	317	28	781 (solid)	60,523
Nonadecane	C_{19}H_{40}	330	32	785 (solid)	148,284
Eicosane	C_{20}H_{42}	343	37	789 (solid)	366,319
Triacontane	C_{30}H_{62}	≈450	66	810 (solid)	4,111,846,763
Tetracontane	C_{40}H_{82}	≈525	82	817 (solid)	62,481,801,147,341
Pentacontane	C_{50}H_{102}	≈575	91	824 (solid)	~ 1.1×10^{18}
Hexacontane	C_{60}H_{122}	≈625	100	829 (solid)	~ 2.2×10^{22}
Heptacontane	C_{70}H_{142}	?	?	? (solid)	~ 4.7×10^{26}
Octacontane	C_{80}H_{162}	?	?	? (solid)	~ 1.1×10^{31}
Nonacontane	C_{90}H_{182}	?	?	? (solid)	~ 2.5×10^{35}
Hectane	C_{100}H_{202}	?	?	? (solid)	~ 5.9×10^{39}

=== Boiling points ===
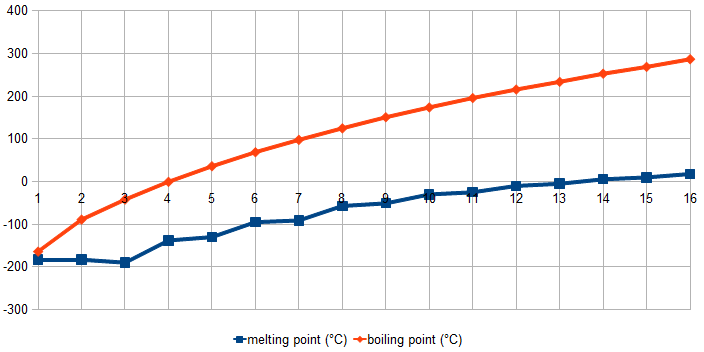
Melting (blue) and boiling (orange) points of the first 16 n-alkanes in °C.

Alkanes experiences intermolecular van der Waals forces. The cumulative effects of these intermolecular forces give rise to greater boiling points of alkanes.

Two factors influence the strength of the van der Waals forces:

- the number of electrons surrounding the molecule, which increases with the alkane's molecular weight
- the surface area of the molecule

Under standard conditions, from CH_{4} to C_{4}H_{10} alkanes are gaseous; from C_{5}H_{12} to C_{17}H_{36} they are liquids; and after C_{18}H_{38} they are solids. As the boiling point of alkanes is primarily determined by weight, it should not be a surprise that the boiling point has an almost linear relationship with the size (molecular weight) of the molecule. As a rule of thumb, the boiling point rises 20–30 °C for each carbon added to the chain; this rule applies to other homologous series.

A straight-chain alkane will have a boiling point higher than a branched-chain alkane due to the greater surface area in contact, and thus greater van der Waals forces, between adjacent molecules. For example, compare isobutane (2-methylpropane) and n-butane, which boil at −12 and 0 °C, and 2,2-dimethylbutane and 2,3-dimethylbutane which boil at 50 and 58 °C, respectively.

On the other hand, cycloalkanes tend to have higher boiling points than their linear counterparts due to the locked conformations of the molecules, which give a plane of intermolecular contact.

=== Melting points ===
The melting points of the alkanes follow a similar trend to boiling points for the same reason as outlined above. That is, (all other things being equal) the larger the molecule the higher the melting point. However, alkanes' melting points follow a more complex pattern, due to variations in the properties of their solid crystals. (Note: For visualizations of the low-temperature crystal structures of alkanes (methane to nonane), see "Solid methane".)

One difference in crystal structure that even-numbered alkanes (from hexane onwards) tend to form denser-packed crystals compared to their odd-numbered neighbors. This causes them to have a greater enthalpy of fusion (amount of energy required to melt them), raising their melting point. A second difference in crystal structure is that even-numbered alkanes (from octane onwards) tend to form more rotationally ordered crystals compared to their odd-numbered neighbors. This causes them to have a greater entropy of fusion (increase in disorder from the solid to the liquid state), lowering their melting point.

While these effects operate in opposing directions, the first effect tends to be slightly stronger, leading even-numbered alkanes to have slightly higher melting points than the average of their odd-numbered neighbors.

This trend does not apply to methane, which has an unusually high melting point, higher than both ethane and propane. This is because it has a very low entropy of fusion, attributable to its high molecular symmetry and the rotational disorder in solid methane near its melting point (Methane I).

The melting points of branched-chain alkanes can be either higher or lower than those of the corresponding straight-chain alkanes, again depending on these two factors. More symmetric alkanes tend towards higher melting points, due to enthalpic effects when they form ordered crystals, and entropic effects when they form disordered crystals (e.g. neopentane).

=== Conductivity and solubility ===
Alkanes do not conduct electricity in any way, nor are they substantially polarized by an electric field. For this reason, they do not form hydrogen bonds and are insoluble in polar solvents such as water. Since the hydrogen bonds between individual water molecules are aligned away from an alkane molecule, the coexistence of an alkane and water leads to an increase in molecular order (a reduction in entropy). As there is no significant bonding between water molecules and alkane molecules, the second law of thermodynamics suggests that this reduction in entropy should be minimized by minimizing the contact between alkane and water: Alkanes are said to be hydrophobic as they are insoluble in water.

Their solubility in nonpolar solvents is relatively high, a property that is called lipophilicity. Alkanes are, for example, miscible in all proportions among themselves.

The density of the alkanes usually increases with the number of carbon atoms but remains less than that of water. Hence, alkanes form the upper layer in an alkane–water mixture.

=== Molecular geometry ===
sp^{3}-hybridization in methane.

The molecular structure of the alkanes directly affects their physical and chemical characteristics. It is derived from the electron configuration of carbon, which has four valence electrons. The carbon atoms in alkanes are described as sp^{3} hybrids; that is to say that, to a good approximation, the valence electrons are in orbitals directed towards the corners of a tetrahedron which are derived from the combination of the 2s orbital and the three 2p orbitals. Geometrically, the angle between the bonds are cos^{−1}(−1/3) ≈ 109.47°. This is exact for the case of methane, while larger alkanes containing a combination of C–H and C–C bonds generally have bonds that are within several degrees of this idealized value.

=== Bond lengths and bond angles ===
The tetrahedral structure of methane.

An alkane has only C–H and C–C single bonds. The former result from the overlap of an sp^{3} orbital of carbon with the 1s orbital of a hydrogen; the latter by the overlap of two sp^{3} orbitals on adjacent carbon atoms. The bond lengths amount to 1.09 × 10^{−10} m for a C–H bond and 1.54 × 10^{−10} m for a C–C bond.

The spatial arrangement of the bonds is similar to that of the four sp^{3} orbitals—they are tetrahedrally arranged, with an angle of 109.47° between them. Structural formulae that represent the bonds as being at right angles to one another, while both common and useful, do not accurately depict the geometry.

=== Conformation ===
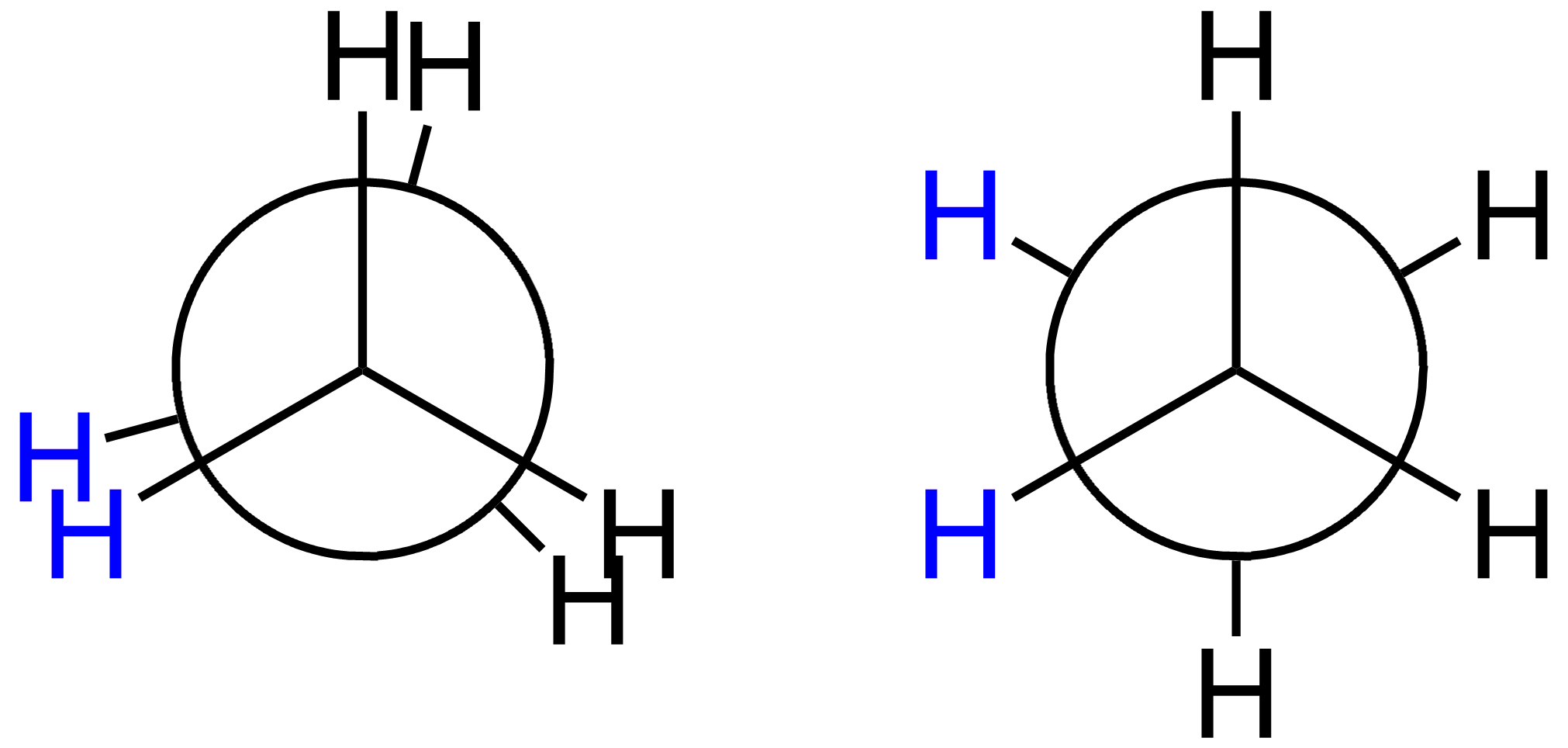
Newman projections of two of many conformations of ethane: eclipsed on the left, staggered on the right.

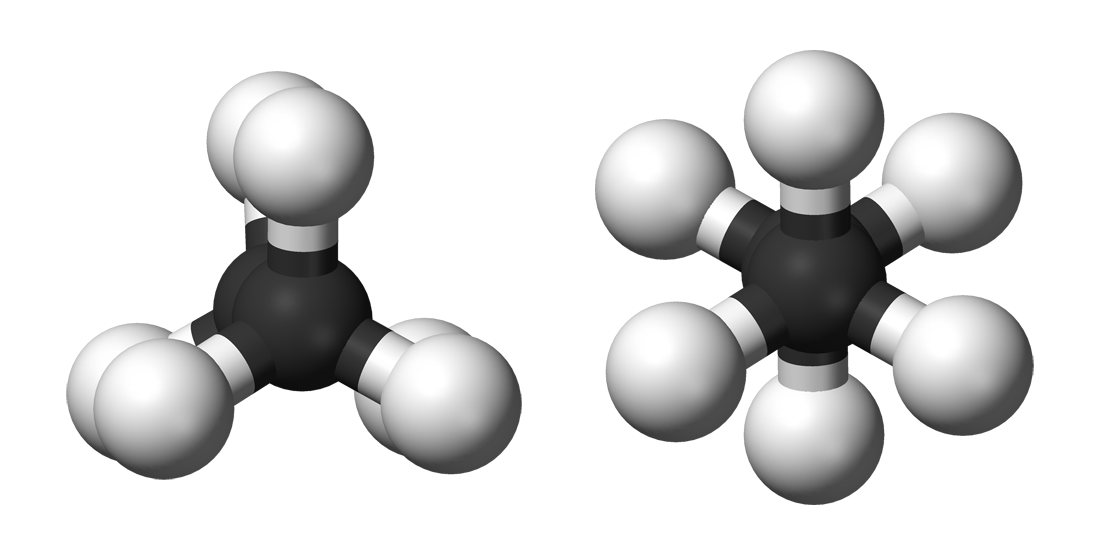
Ball-and-stick models of the two rotamers of ethane

The spatial arrangement of the C-C and C-H bonds are described by the torsion angles of the molecule, known as its conformation. In ethane, the simplest case for studying the conformation of alkanes, there is nearly free rotation about a carbon–carbon single bond. Two limiting conformations are important: eclipsed conformation and staggered conformation. The staggered conformation is 12.6 kJ/mol (3.0 kcal/mol) lower in energy (more stable) than the eclipsed conformation (the least stable). In highly branched alkanes, the bond angle may differ from the optimal value (109.5°) to accommodate bulky groups. Such distortions introduce a tension in the molecule, known as steric hindrance or strain. Strain substantially increases reactivity.

=== Spectroscopic properties ===
Spectroscopic signatures for alkanes are obtainable by the major characterization techniques.

==== Infrared spectroscopy ====
The C-H stretching mode gives strong absorptions between 2850 and 2960 cm^{−1} and weaker bands for the C-C stretching mode absorbs between 800 and 1300 cm^{−1}. The carbon–hydrogen bending modes depend on the nature of the group: methyl groups show bands at 1450 cm^{−1} and 1375 cm^{−1}, while methylene groups show bands at 1465 cm^{−1} and 1450 cm^{−1}. Carbon chains with more than four carbon atoms show a weak absorption at around 725 cm^{−1}.

==== NMR spectroscopy ====
The proton resonances of alkanes are usually found at δ_{H} = 0.5–1.5. The carbon-13 resonances depend on the number of hydrogen atoms attached to the carbon: δ_{C} = 8–30 (primary, methyl, –CH_{3}), 15–55 (secondary, methylene, –CH_{2}–), 20–60 (tertiary, methyne, C–H) and quaternary. The carbon-13 resonance of quaternary carbon atoms is characteristically weak, due to the lack of nuclear Overhauser effect and the long relaxation time, and can be missed in weak samples, or samples that have not been run for a sufficiently long time.

==== Mass spectrometry ====
Since alkanes have high ionization energies, their electron impact mass spectra show weak currents for their molecular ions. The fragmentation pattern can be difficult to interpret, but in the case of branched chain alkanes, the carbon chain is preferentially cleaved at tertiary or quaternary carbons due to the relative stability of the resulting free radicals. The mass spectra for straight-chain alkanes is illustrated by that for dodecane: the fragment resulting from the loss of a single methyl group (M − 15) is absent, fragments are more intense than the molecular ion and are spaced by intervals of 14 mass units, corresponding to loss of CH_{2} groups.

== Chemical properties ==
Alkanes are only weakly reactive with most chemical compounds. They only react with the strongest of electrophilic reagents by virtue of their strong C–H bonds (~100 kcal/mol) and C–C bonds (~90 kcal/mol). They are also relatively unreactive toward free radicals. This inertness is the source of the term paraffins (with the meaning here of "lacking affinity"). In crude oil the alkane molecules have remained chemically unchanged for millions of years.

=== Acid-base behavior ===
The acid dissociation constant (pK_{a}) values of all alkanes are estimated to range from 50 to 70, depending on the extrapolation method, hence they are extremely weak acids that are practically inert to bases (see: carbon acids). They are also extremely weak bases, undergoing no observable protonation in pure sulfuric acid (H_{0} ~ −12), although superacids that are at least millions of times stronger have been known to protonate them to give hypercoordinate alkanium ions (see: methanium ion). Thus, a mixture of antimony pentafluoride (SbF_{5}) and fluorosulfonic acid (HSO_{3}F), called magic acid, can protonate alkanes.

=== Chemistry with main group reagents ===
Alkane C–H bonds are constructed from filled low lying σ orbitals that are only reactive toward the strongest of electrophiles. Alkanes undergo oxygen atom insertion into the C–H bond in the presence of (trifluoromethyl)methyldioxirane to generate alcohols with retention of stereochemistry through a rebound mechanism similar to oxygenation by P450 enzymes. Alkanes also undergo C–H fluorination through a similar process in the presence of tetrafluoroammonium hexafluoroantimonate.

=== Reactions with oxygen (combustion reaction) ===
All alkanes react with oxygen in a combustion reaction, although they become increasingly difficult to ignite as the number of carbon atoms increases. The general equation for complete combustion is:

C_{n}H_{2n+2} + (3/2n + 1/2) O_{2} → (n + 1) H_{2}O + n CO_{2}
or C_{n}H_{2n+2} + ((3n + 1)/2) O_{2} → (n + 1) H_{2}O + n CO_{2}

In the absence of sufficient oxygen, carbon monoxide or even soot can be formed, as shown below:

C_{n}H_{2n+2} + (n + 1/2) O_{2} → (n + 1) H_{2}O + n CO

C_{n}H_{2n+2} + (1/2n + 1/2) O_{2} → (n + 1) H_{2}O + n C

For example, methane:

2 CH_{4} + 3 O_{2} → 4 H_{2}O + 2 CO
CH_{4} + O_{2} → 2 H_{2}O + C

See the alkane heat of formation table for detailed data. The standard enthalpy change of combustion, Δ_{c}H^{⊖}, for alkanes increases by about 650 kJ/mol per CH_{2} group. Branched-chain alkanes have lower values of Δ_{c}H^{⊖} than straight-chain alkanes of the same number of carbon atoms, and so can be seen to be somewhat more stable.

=== Biodegradation ===
Some organisms are capable of metabolizing alkanes. The methane monooxygenases convert methane to methanol. For higher alkanes, cytochrome P450 convert alkanes to alcohols, which are then susceptible to degradation.

=== Free radical reactions ===
Free radicals, molecules with unpaired electrons, play a large role in most reactions of alkanes. Free radical halogenation reactions occur with halogens, leading to the production of haloalkanes. The hydrogen atoms of the alkane are progressively replaced by halogen atoms. The reaction of alkanes and fluorine is highly exothermic and can lead to an explosion. These reactions are an important industrial route to halogenated hydrocarbons. There are three steps:

- Initiation the halogen radicals form by homolysis. Usually, energy in the form of heat or light is required.
- Chain reaction or Propagation then takes place—the halogen radical abstracts a hydrogen from the alkane to give an alkyl radical. This reacts further.
- Chain termination where the radicals recombine.

Experiments have shown that all halogenation produces a mixture of all possible isomers, indicating that all hydrogen atoms are susceptible to reaction. The mixture produced, however, is not statistical: Secondary and tertiary hydrogen atoms are preferentially replaced due to the greater stability of secondary and tertiary free-radicals. An example can be seen in the monobromination of propane:

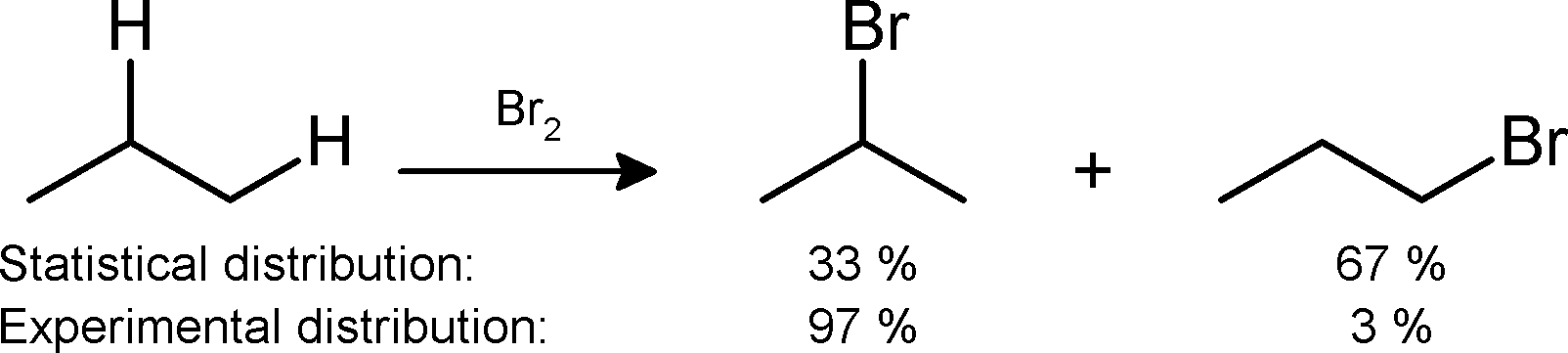
Monobromination of propane

In the Reed reaction, sulfur dioxide and chlorine convert hydrocarbons to sulfonyl chlorides under the influence of light.

Under some conditions, alkanes will undergo nitration.

=== C–H activation ===
Certain transition metal complexes promote non-radical reactions with alkanes, resulting in C–H bond activation reactions.

=== Cracking ===
Cracking breaks larger molecules into smaller ones. This reaction requires heat and catalysts. The thermal cracking process follows a homolytic mechanism with formation of free radicals. The catalytic cracking process involves the presence of acid catalysts (usually solid acids such as silica-alumina and zeolites), which promote a heterolytic (asymmetric) breakage of bonds yielding pairs of ions of opposite charges, usually a carbocation. Carbon-localized free radicals and cations are both highly unstable and undergo processes of chain rearrangement, C–C scission in position beta (i.e., cracking) and intra- and intermolecular hydrogen transfer or hydride transfer. In both types of processes, the corresponding reactive intermediates (radicals, ions) are permanently regenerated, and thus they proceed by a self-propagating chain mechanism. The chain of reactions is eventually terminated by radical or ion recombination.

=== Isomerization and reformation ===
Dragan and his colleague were the first to report about isomerization in alkanes. Isomerization and reformation are processes in which straight-chain alkanes are heated in the presence of a platinum catalyst. In isomerization, the alkanes become branched-chain isomers. In other words, it does not lose any carbons or hydrogens, keeping the same molecular weight. In reformation, the alkanes become cycloalkanes or aromatic hydrocarbons, giving off hydrogen as a by-product. Both of these processes raise the octane number of the substance. Butane is the most common alkane that is put under the process of isomerization, as it makes many branched alkanes with high octane numbers.

=== Other reactions ===
In steam reforming, alkanes react with steam in the presence of a nickel catalyst to give hydrogen and carbon monoxide.

== Occurrence ==
=== Occurrence of alkanes in the Universe ===
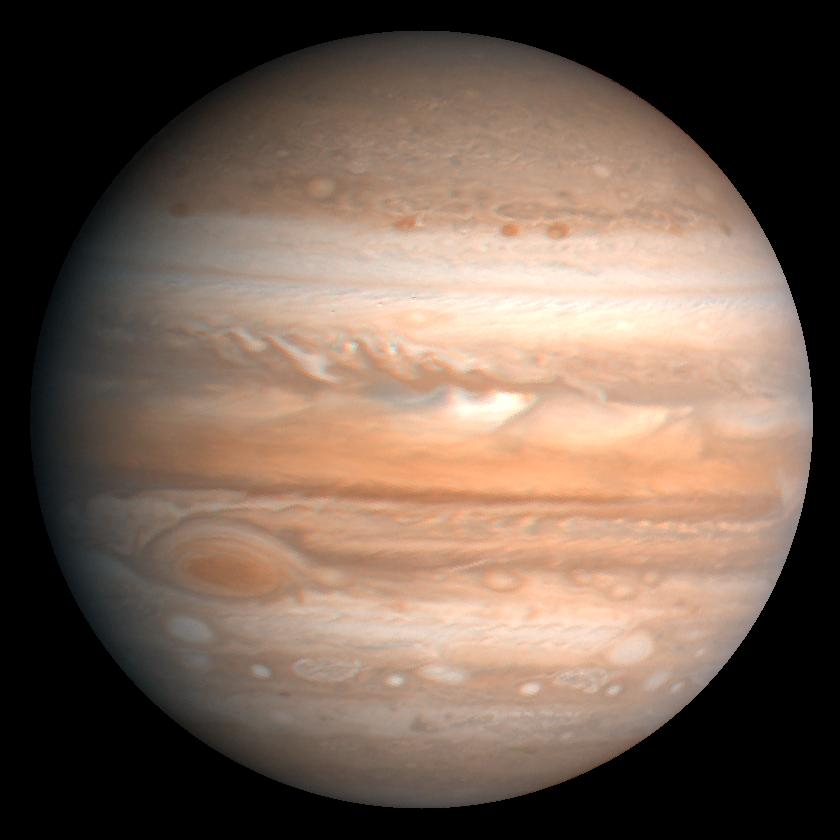
Methane and ethane make up a tiny proportion of Jupiter's atmosphere

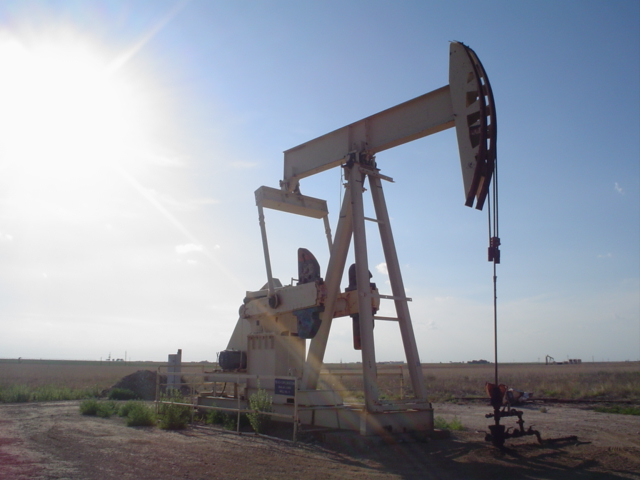
Extraction of oil, which contains many distinct hydrocarbons including alkanes

Alkanes form a small portion of the atmospheres of the outer gas planets such as Jupiter (0.1% methane, 2 ppm ethane), Saturn (0.2% methane, 5 ppm ethane), Uranus (1.99% methane, 2.5 ppm ethane) and Neptune (1.5% methane, 1.5 ppm ethane). Titan (1.6% methane), a satellite of Saturn, was examined by the Huygens probe, which indicated that Titan's atmosphere periodically rains liquid methane onto the moon's surface. Also on Titan, the Cassini mission has imaged seasonal methane/ethane lakes near the polar regions of Titan. Methane and ethane have been detected in the tail of the comet Hyakutake. Chemical analysis showed that the abundances of ethane and methane were roughly equal, which is thought to imply that its ices formed in interstellar space, away from the Sun, which would have evaporated these volatile molecules. Alkanes have been detected in meteorites such as carbonaceous chondrites.

=== Occurrence of alkanes on Earth ===
Traces of methane gas (about 0.0002% or 1745 ppb) occur in the Earth's atmosphere, produced primarily by methanogenic microorganisms, such as Archaea in the gut of ruminants.

The most important commercial sources for alkanes are natural gas and oil. Natural gas contains primarily methane and ethane, with some propane and butane: oil is a mixture of liquid alkanes and other hydrocarbons. These hydrocarbons were formed when marine animals and plants (zooplankton and phytoplankton) died and sank to the bottom of ancient seas and were covered with sediments in an anoxic environment and converted over many millions of years at high temperatures and high pressure to their current form. Natural gas resulted thereby for example from the following reaction:

C_{6}H_{12}O_{6} → 3 CH_{4} + 3 CO_{2}

These hydrocarbon deposits, collected in porous rocks trapped beneath impermeable cap rocks, comprise commercial oil fields. They have formed over millions of years and once exhausted cannot be readily replaced. The depletion of these hydrocarbons reserves is the basis for what is known as the energy crisis.

Alkanes have a low solubility in water, so the content in the oceans is negligible; however, at high pressures and low temperatures (such as at the bottom of the oceans), methane can co-crystallize with water to form a solid methane clathrate (methane hydrate). Although this cannot be commercially exploited at the present time, the amount of combustible energy of the known methane clathrate fields exceeds the energy content of all the natural gas and oil deposits put together. Methane extracted from methane clathrate is, therefore, a candidate for future fuels.

=== Biological occurrence ===
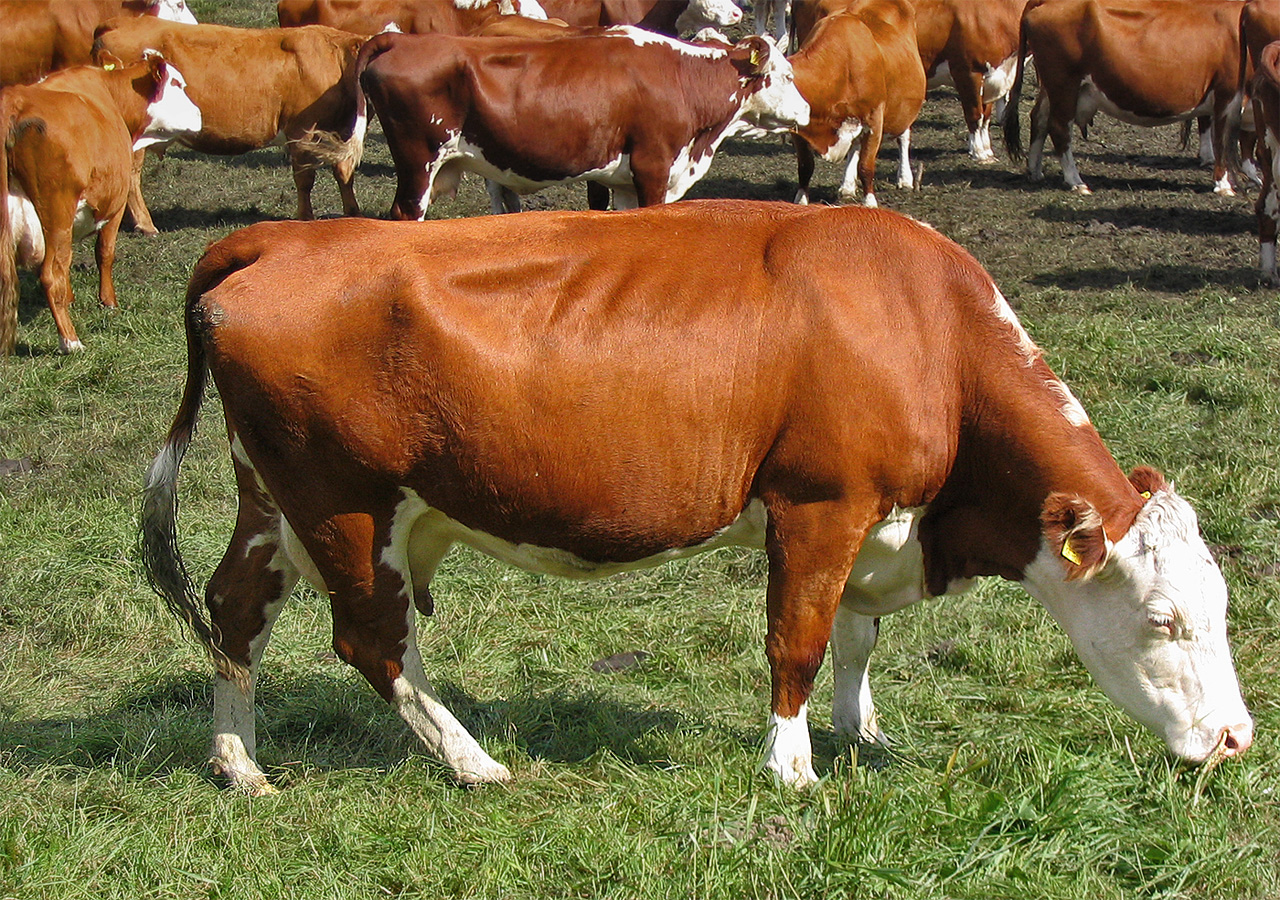
Methanogenic archaea in the gut of cows produce methane.

Aside from petroleum and natural gas, alkanes occur significantly in nature only as methane, which is produced by some archaea by the process of methanogenesis. These organisms are found in the gut of termites and cows. The methane is produced from carbon dioxide or other organic compounds. Energy is released by the oxidation of hydrogen:

CO_{2} + 4 H_{2} → CH_{4} + 2 H_{2}O

It is probable that our current deposits of natural gas were formed in a similar way.

Certain types of bacteria can metabolize alkanes: they prefer even-numbered carbon chains as they are easier to degrade than odd-numbered chains.

Alkanes play a negligible role in higher organisms, with rare exception. Some yeasts, e.g., Candida tropicale, Pichia sp., Rhodotorula sp., can use alkanes as a source of carbon or energy. The fungus Amorphotheca resinae prefers the longer-chain alkanes in aviation fuel, and can cause serious problems for aircraft in tropical regions.

In plants, the solid long-chain alkanes are found in the plant cuticle and epicuticular wax of many species, but are only rarely major constituents. They protect the plant against water loss, prevent the leaching of important minerals by the rain, and protect against bacteria, fungi, and harmful insects. The carbon chains in plant alkanes are usually odd-numbered, between 27 and 33 carbon atoms in length, and are made by the plants by decarboxylation of even-numbered fatty acids. The exact composition of the layer of wax is not only species-dependent but also changes with the season and such environmental factors as lighting conditions, temperature or humidity.

The Jeffrey pine is noted for producing exceptionally high levels of n-heptane in its resin, for which reason its distillate was designated as the zero point for one octane rating. Floral scents have also long been known to contain volatile alkane components, and n-nonane is a significant component in the scent of some roses. Emission of gaseous and volatile alkanes such as ethane, pentane, and hexane by plants has also been documented at low levels, though they are not generally considered to be a major component of biogenic air pollution.

Edible vegetable oils also typically contain small fractions of biogenic alkanes with a wide spectrum of carbon numbers, mainly 8 to 35, usually peaking in the low to upper 20s, with concentrations up to dozens of milligrams per kilogram (parts per million by weight) and sometimes over a hundred for the total alkane fraction.

Alkanes are important as pheromones, chemical messenger materials, on which insects depend for communication. 7-methyltricosane and 9-methyltricosane are active for ladybird beetles (Adalia bipunctata). The emerald ash borer (Agrilus planipennis Fairmaire) responds to 9-methylpentacosane. Female Asian long-horned beetles Anoplophora glabripennis, which are very damaging, secrete 2-methyldocosane. Waggle-dancing honey bees produce and release two alkanes, tricosane and pentacosane.

=== Ecological relations ===
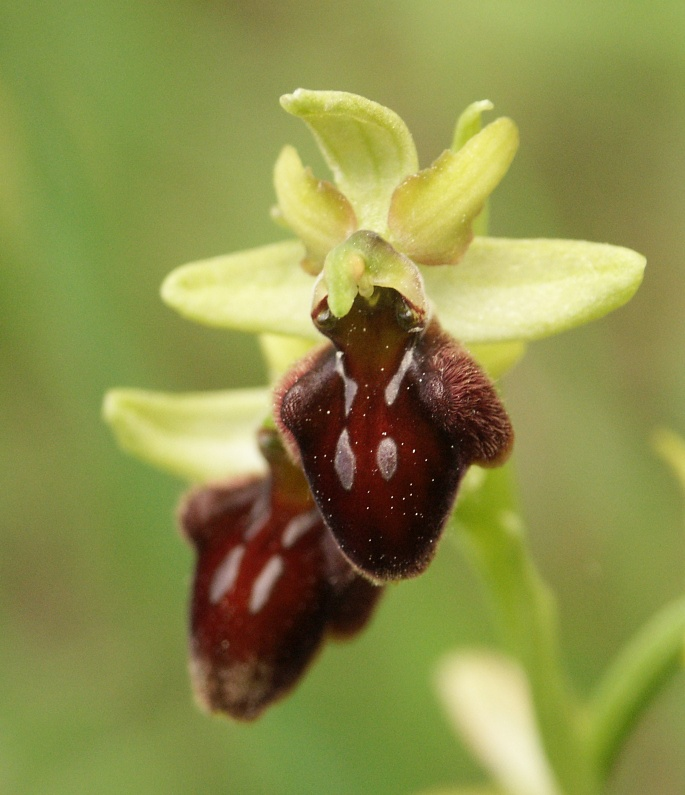
Early spider orchid (Ophrys sphegodes)

One example, in which both plant and animal alkanes play a role, is the ecological relationship between the sand bee (Andrena nigroaenea) and the early spider orchid (Ophrys sphegodes); the latter is dependent for pollination on the former. Sand bees use pheromones in order to identify a mate; in the case of A. nigroaenea, the females emit a mixture of tricosane (C_{23}H_{48}), pentacosane (C_{25}H_{52}) and heptacosane (C_{27}H_{56}) in the ratio 3:3:1, and males are attracted by specifically this odor. The orchid takes advantage of this mating arrangement to get the male bee to collect and disseminate its pollen; parts of its flower not only resemble the appearance of sand bees but also produce large quantities of the three alkanes in the same ratio as female sand bees. As a result, numerous males are lured to the blooms and attempt to copulate with their imaginary partner: although this endeavor is not crowned with success for the bee, it allows the orchid to transfer its pollen, which will be dispersed after the departure of the frustrated male to other blooms.

== Production ==
=== Petroleum refining ===
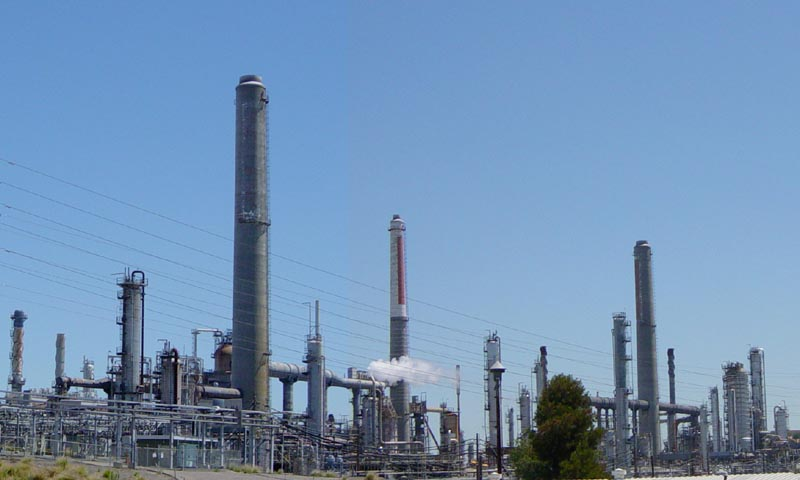
An oil refinery at Martinez, California.

The most important source of alkanes is natural gas and crude oil. Alkanes are separated in an oil refinery by fractional distillation. Unsaturated hydrocarbons are converted to alkanes by hydrogenation:

RCH=CH_{2} + H_{2} → RCH_{2}−CH_{3} (R = alkyl)

Another route to alkanes is hydrogenolysis, which entails cleavage of C-heteroatom bonds using hydrogen. In industry, the main substrates are organonitrogen and organosulfur impurities, i.e. the heteroatoms are N and S. The specific processes are called hydrodenitrification and hydrodesulfurization:

R_{3}N + 3 H_{2} → 3 RH + H_{3}N
R_{2}S + 2 H_{2} → 2 RH + H_{2}S

Hydrogenolysis can be applied to the conversion of virtually any functional group into hydrocarbons. Substrates include haloalkanes, alcohols, aldehydes, ketones, carboxylic acids, etc. Both hydrogenolysis and hydrogenation are practiced in refineries. They can be effected by using lithium aluminium hydride, Clemmenson reduction and other specialized routes.

=== Coal ===
Coal is a more traditional precursor to alkanes. A wide range of technologies have been intensively practiced for centuries. Simply heating coal gives alkanes, leaving behind coke. Relevant technologies include the Bergius process and coal liquefaction. Partial combustion of coal and related solid organic compounds generates carbon monoxide, which can be hydrogenated using the Fischer–Tropsch process. This technology allows the synthesis of liquid hydrocarbons, including alkanes. This method is used to produce substitutes for petroleum distillates.

=== Laboratory preparation ===
Rarely is there any interest in the synthesis of alkanes, since they are usually commercially available and less valued than virtually any precursor. The best-known method is hydrogenation of alkenes. Many C−X bonds can be converted to C−H bonds using lithium aluminium hydride, Clemmenson reduction, and other specialized routes. Hydrolysis of alkyl Grignard reagents and alkyl organolithium reagents gives alkanes.

== Applications ==
=== Fuels ===
The dominant use of alkanes is as fuels. Propane and butane, easily liquified gases, are commonly known as liquified petroleum gas (LPG). From pentane to octane the alkanes are highly volatile liquids. They are used as fuels in internal combustion engines, as they vaporize easily on entry into the combustion chamber without forming droplets, which would impair the uniformity of the combustion. Branched-chain alkanes are preferred as they are much less prone to premature ignition, which causes knocking, than their straight-chain homologues. This propensity to premature ignition is measured by the octane rating of the fuel, where 2,2,4-trimethylpentane (isooctane) has an arbitrary value of 100, and heptane has a value of zero. Apart from their use as fuels, the middle alkanes are also good solvents for nonpolar substances. Alkanes from nonane to, for instance, hexadecane (an alkane with sixteen carbon atoms) are liquids of higher viscosity, less and less suitable for use in gasoline. They form instead the major part of diesel and aviation fuel. Diesel fuels are characterized by their cetane number, cetane being an old name for hexadecane. However, the higher melting points of these alkanes can cause problems at low temperatures and in polar regions, where the fuel becomes too thick to flow correctly.

=== Precursors to chemicals ===
By the process of cracking, alkanes can be converted to alkenes. Simple alkenes are precursors to polymers, such as polyethylene and polypropylene. When the cracking is taken to extremes, alkanes can be converted to carbon black, which is a significant tire component.

Chlorination of methane gives chloromethanes, which are used as solvents and building blocks for complex compounds. Similarly treatment of methane with sulfur gives carbon disulfide. Still other chemicals are prepared by reaction with sulfur trioxide and nitric oxide.

=== Other ===
Some light hydrocarbons are used as aerosol sprays.

Alkanes from hexadecane upwards form the most important components of fuel oil and lubricating oil. In the latter function, they work at the same time as anti-corrosive agents, as their hydrophobic nature means that water cannot reach the metal surface. Many solid alkanes find use as paraffin wax, for example, in candles. This should not be confused however with true wax, which consists primarily of esters.

Alkanes with a chain length of approximately 35 or more carbon atoms are found in bitumen, used, for example, in road surfacing. However, the higher alkanes have little value and are usually split into lower alkanes by cracking.

== Hazards ==
Alkanes are highly flammable, but they have low toxicities. Methane "is toxicologically virtually inert". Alkanes can be asphyxiants and narcotic.

== See also ==
- Alkene
- Alkyne
- Cycloalkane
- Higher alkane
- Aliphatic compound
