= Methylhexane =

Methylhexane may refer to either of two chemical compounds:

- 2-Methylhexane
- 3-Methylhexane
