= List of isomers of nonane =

This is the list of structural isomers of nonane. There are 35.

== Straight-chain ==
- Nonane

== Octanes ==
- 2-Methyloctane
- 3-Methyloctane
- 4-Methyloctane

== Heptanes ==
Isomers where heptane is the longest chain

=== Dimethyl ===
- 2,2-Dimethylheptane
- 2,3-Dimethylheptane
- 2,4-Dimethylheptane
- 2,5-Dimethylheptane
- 2,6-Dimethylheptane
- 3,3-Dimethylheptane
- 3,4-Dimethylheptane
- 3,5-Dimethylheptane
- 4,4-Dimethylheptane

=== Ethyl ===
- 3-Ethylheptane
- 4-Ethylheptane

== Hexane ==
Isomers where hexane is the longest chain include:

=== Trimethyl ===
- 2,2,3-Trimethylhexane
- 2,2,4-Trimethylhexane
- 2,2,5-Trimethylhexane
- 2,3,3-Trimethylhexane
- 2,3,4-Trimethylhexane
- 2,3,5-Trimethylhexane
- 2,4,4-Trimethylhexane
- 3,3,4-Trimethylhexane

=== Ethyl+Methyl ===
- 3-Ethyl-2-methylhexane
- 4-Ethyl-2-methylhexane
- 3-Ethyl-3-methylhexane
- 3-Ethyl-4-methylhexane

== Pentane ==
Isomers where pentane is the longest chain include:

=== Tetramethyl ===
- 2,2,3,3-Tetramethylpentane
- 2,2,3,4-Tetramethylpentane
- 2,2,4,4-Tetramethylpentane
- 2,3,3,4-Tetramethylpentane

=== Ethyl+Dimethyl ===
- 3-Ethyl-2,2-dimethylpentane
- 3-Ethyl-2,3-dimethylpentane
- 3-Ethyl-2,4-dimethylpentane

=== Diethyl ===
- 3,3-Diethylpentane (or Tetraethylmethane)
