= 3,3-Dimethylpentane =

- Skeletal structure of 3,3-dimethylpentane

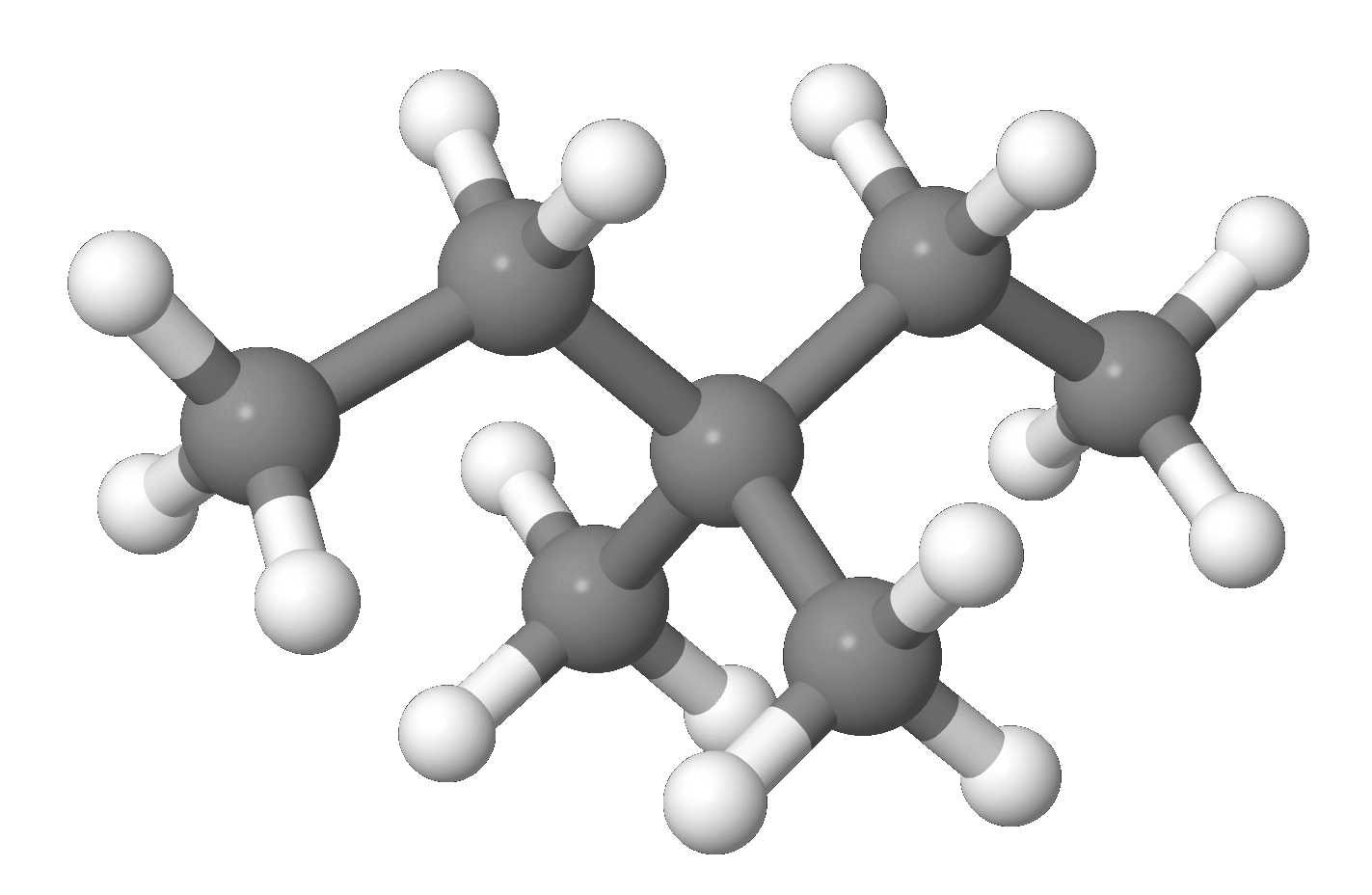
- Ball-and-Stick model of 3,3-dimethylpentane

Names
- Preferred IUPAC name 3,3-Dimethylpentane

Identifiers
| CAS Number | 562-49-2 |
| 3D model (JSmol) | Interactive image |
| ChEMBL | ChEMBL3188231 |
| ChemSpider | 10755 |
| ECHA InfoCard | 100.008.392 |
| EC Number | 209-230-8 |
| PubChem CID | 11229 |
| UNII | R1RH0VBD2L |
| CompTox Dashboard (EPA) | DTXSID0049319 |
- InChI: InChI=1S/C7H16/c1-5-7(3,4)6-2/h5-6H2,1-4H3 Key: AEXMKKGTQYQZCS-UHFFFAOYSA-N
- SMILES: CCC(C)(C)CC

Properties
| Chemical formula | C_{7}H_{16} |
| Molar mass | 100.205 g·mol^{−1} |

Hazards
- GHS labelling
| Pictograms | (GHS02: Flammable) (GHS07: Exclamation mark) (GHS08: Health hazard) (GHS09: Environmental hazard) |
| Signal word | Danger |
| Hazard statements | H225, H304, H315, H336, H410 |
| Precautionary statements | P210, P233, P240, P241, P242, P243, P261, P264, P271, P273, P280, P301+P310, P302+P352, P303+P361+P353, P304+P340, P312, P321, P331, P332+P313, P362, P370+P378, P391, P403+P233, P403+P235, P405, P501 |
- Except where otherwise noted, data are given for materials in their standard state (at 25 °C [77 °F], 100 kPa). Infobox references

3,3-Dimethylpentane is one of the isomers of heptane. 3,3-Dimethylpentane has a boiling point of 86.0 °C and melting point of −134.9 °C. Its density is 0.6934. The refractive index is 1.39092 at 20 °C.

== Preparation ==
A method to produce 3,3-dimethylpentane is to react tert-amyl chloride (CH_{3}CH_{2}C(CH_{3})_{2}Cl) with propionaldehyde (CH_{3}CH_{2}CHO) producing 3,3-dimethylpentan-2-ol. This is then dehydrated to produce 3,3-dimethylpent-2-ene, which when hydrogenated produces some 3,3-dimethylpentane, but also 2,3-dimethylpentane.

== Properties ==
In 1929 Graham Edgar and George Calingaert made 3,3-dimethylpentane and measured its physical characteristics for the first time. The measurements were at 20 °C, not the standard conditions used in later times.

For 3,3-dimethylpentane they measured a density of 0.6934 at 20 °C with a rate of change Δd/ΔT of 0.000848. The dielectric constant is 1.940. The refractive index at 20° is 1.39114. The adiabatic compressibility is 0.00011455 and isothermal compressibility is 0.00014513 atmospheres. The velocity of sound is 1.1295 km/s. Coefficient of thermal expansion is 0.002467/°. Surface tension is 19.63 dynes/cm. Viscosity is 0.00454. The heat of combustion is 11470 cal/g which is very similar to other heptanes.
