= Heptane =

Chemical compound (C7H16)

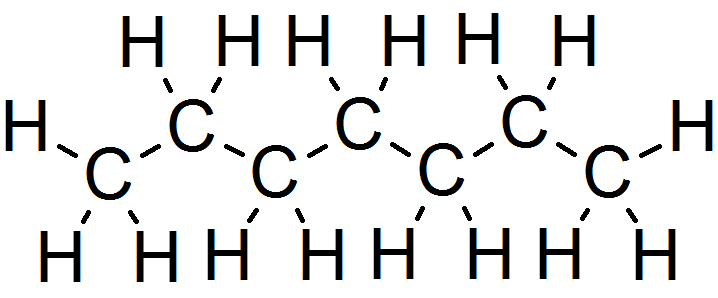

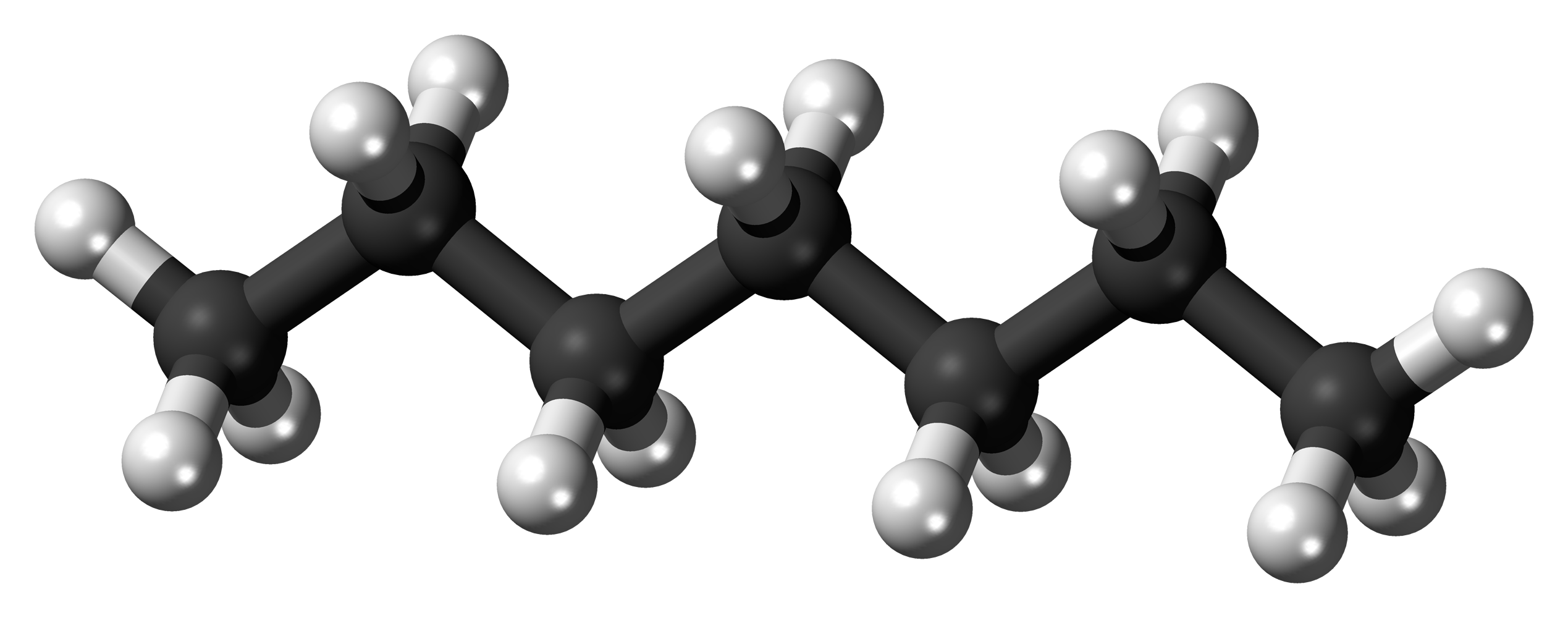

Names
- Preferred IUPAC name Heptane
- Other names Septane

Identifiers
| CAS Number | 142-82-5 |
| 3D model (JSmol) | Interactive image |
| Beilstein Reference | 1730763 |
| ChEBI | CHEBI:43098 |
| ChEMBL | ChEMBL134658 |
| ChemSpider | 8560 |
| EC Number | 205-563-8 |
| Gmelin Reference | 49760 |
| MeSH | n-heptane |
| PubChem CID | 8900 |
| RTECS number | MI7700000 |
| UNII | 456148SDMJ |
| UN number | 1206 |
- InChI: InChI=1S/C7H16/c1-3-5-7-6-4-2/h3-7H2,1-2H3 Key: IMNFDUFMRHMDMM-UHFFFAOYSA-N
- SMILES: CCCCCCC

Properties
| Chemical formula | C_{7}H_{16} |
| Molar mass | 100.205 g·mol^{−1} |
| Appearance | Colourless liquid |
| Odor | Petrolic |
| Density | 0.6795 g⋅cm^{−3} |
| Melting point | −90.549 °C (−130.988 °F; 182.601 K) |
| Boiling point | 98.38 °C (209.08 °F; 371.53 K) |
| Solubility in water | insoluble |
| log P | 4.66 |
| Vapor pressure | 5.33 kPa (0.773 psi) (20 °C (68 °F; 293 K)) |
| Henry's law constant (k_{H}) | 12 nmol/(Pa·kg) |
| Magnetic susceptibility (χ) | −85.24×10^{−6} cm^{3}/mol |
| Refractive index (n_{D}) | 1.3855 |
| Viscosity | 0.389 mPa·s |

Thermochemistry
| Heat capacity (C) | 224.64 J⋅mol^{−1}·K^{-1} |
| Std molar entropy (S^{⦵}_{298}) | 328.57 J⋅mol^{−1}·K^{-1} |
| Std enthalpy of formation (Δ_{f}H^{⦵}_{298}) | −225.2 to −223.6 kJ⋅mol^{−1} |
| Std enthalpy of combustion (Δ_{c}H^{⦵}_{298}) | −4.825 to −4.809 MJ⋅mol^{−1} |

Hazards
- GHS labelling
| Pictograms | (GHS02: Flammable) (GHS07: Exclamation mark) (GHS08: Health hazard) (GHS09: Environmental hazard) |
| Signal word | Danger |
| Hazard statements | H225, H304, H315, H336, H410 |
| Precautionary statements | P210, P233, P240, P241, P242, P243, P261, P264, P271, P273, P280, P301+P310, P303+P361+P353, P304+P340+P312, P331, P332+P313, P362, P370+P378, P391, P403+P233, P403+P235, P405, P501 |
| NFPA 704 (fire diamond) | 3 3 0 |
| Flash point | −4 °C (25 °F; 269 K) |
| Autoignition temperature | 215 °C (419 °F; 488 K) |
| Explosive limits | 1.05%–6.7% |
| Threshold limit value (TLV) | 200 ppm (TWA), 400 ppm (STEL) |
- Lethal dose or concentration (LD, LC)
| LD_{50} (median dose) | >2000 mg/kg (rat, oral); 3000 mg/kg (rabbit, dermal) |
| LC_{50} (median concentration) | 17,986 ppm (mouse, 2 hr) |
| LC_{Lo} (lowest published) | 16,000 ppm (human); 15,000 ppm (mouse, 30 min) |
- NIOSH (US health exposure limits)
| PEL (Permissible) | TWA 500 ppm (2000 mg/m^{3}) |
| REL (Recommended) | TWA 85 ppm (350 mg/m^{3}); C 440 ppm (1800 mg/m^{3}, 15 minute) |
| IDLH (Immediate danger) | 750 ppm |

Related compounds
| Related alkanes | Hexane; Octane |
- Except where otherwise noted, data are given for materials in their standard state (at 25 °C [77 °F], 100 kPa). verify (what is ?) Infobox references

Heptane or n-heptane is the straight-chain alkane with the chemical formula H_{3}C(CH_{2})_{5}CH_{3} or C_{7}H_{16}. When used as a test fuel component in anti-knock test engines, a 100% heptane fuel is the zero point of the octane rating scale (the 100 point is 100% iso-octane). Octane number equates to the anti-knock qualities of a comparison mixture of heptane and iso-octane, expressed as the percentage of iso-octane in heptane, and is listed on pumps for gasoline (petrol) dispensed globally.

== History ==
Normal heptane was discovered in 1862 by Carl Schorlemmer, who, while analyzing pyrolysis products of the cannel coal mined in Wigan, identified, separated by fractional distillation and studied a series of liquid hydrocarbons inert to nitric and sulfuric acids. One of them, which he called hydride of heptyl (oenanthyl), had an empirical formula of C_{7}H_{16}, density of 0.709 g/mL at 18 °C (64 °F) and boiled at 98–99 °C (208–210 °F). In the next year he identified the same compound in the Pennsylvanian oil. By 1872 he switched his nomenclature to the modern one.

During the American Civil War and shortly thereafter, Californians discovered that some pines, like the Jeffrey pine, gave turpentine with unusual properties. It took until 1879 to identify heptane as the cause of this, and this fact was only accepted by European chemists by the end of the 19th century.

== Uses ==
Heptane and its many isomers are widely used in laboratories as non-polar solvents. As a liquid, it is ideal for transport and storage.

Aqueous bromine may be distinguished from aqueous iodine by its appearance after extraction into heptane. In water, both bromine and iodine appear brown. However, iodine turns purple when dissolved in heptane, whereas the bromine solution remains brown.

Heptane is commercially available as both pure and mixed isomers for use in paints and coatings, as the rubber cement solvent "Bestine" and as a pure n-heptane for research and development and pharmaceutical manufacturing.

It is a minor component of most gasoline. On average, gasoline is about 1% heptane.

Heptane is also used as an adhesive remover by stamp collectors. Since 1974, the United States Postal Service has issued self-adhesive stamps that may be difficult to separate from envelopes via the traditional method of soaking in water. Heptane-based products like Bestine, as well as limonene-based products, are alternative solvents for removing stamps more easily.

=== Octane rating scale ===
n-Heptane is defined as the zero point of the octane rating scale. It is a lighter component in gasoline and burns more explosively, causing engine pre-ignition (knocking) in its pure form, as opposed to octane isomers, which burn more slowly and give less knocking. It was originally chosen as the zero point of the scale because of the availability of very high purity n-heptane, unmixed with other isomers of heptane or other alkanes, distilled from the resin of Jeffrey pine and from the fruit of Pittosporum resiniferum. Other sources of heptane and octane, produced from crude oil, contain a mixture of different isomers with greatly differing ratings, and do not give as precise a zero point.

== Isomers and enantiomers ==
Heptane has nine isomers, or eleven if enantiomers are counted:

- Heptane (n-heptane), H_{3}C−CH_{2}−CH_{2}−CH_{2}−CH_{2}−CH_{2}−CH_{3}
- 2-Methylhexane (isoheptane), H_{3}C−CH(CH_{3})−CH_{2}−CH_{2}−CH_{2}−CH_{3}
- 3-Methylhexane, H_{3}C−CH_{2}−C^{*}H(CH_{3})−CH_{2}−CH_{2}−CH_{3} (chiral)
- 2,2-Dimethylpentane (neoheptane), H_{3}C−C(CH_{3})_{2}−CH_{2}−CH_{2}−CH_{3}
- 2,3-Dimethylpentane, H_{3}C−CH(CH_{3})−C^{*}H(CH_{3})−CH_{2}−CH_{3} (chiral)
- 2,4-Dimethylpentane, H_{3}C−CH(CH_{3})−CH_{2}−CH(CH_{3})−CH_{3}
- 3,3-Dimethylpentane, H_{3}C−CH_{2}−C(CH_{3})_{2}−CH_{2}−CH_{3}
- 3-Ethylpentane, H_{3}C−CH_{2}−CH(CH_{2}CH_{3})−CH_{2}−CH_{3}
- 2,2,3-Trimethylbutane, H_{3}C−C(CH_{3})_{2}−CH(CH_{3})−CH_{3}, also known as pentamethylethane and triptane.

== Preparation ==
The linear n-heptane can be obtained from Jeffrey pine oil. The six branched isomers without a quaternary carbon can be prepared by creating a suitable secondary or tertiary alcohol by the Grignard reaction, converting it to an alkene by dehydrogenation, and hydrogenating the latter. The 2,2-dimethylpentane isomer can be prepared by reacting tert-butyl chloride with n-propyl magnesium bromide. The 3,3-dimethylpentane isomer can be prepared from tert-amyl chloride and ethyl magnesium bromide.

== Health risks ==
Heptane is toxic. Acute exposure to heptane vapors can cause dizziness, stupor, incoordination, loss of appetite, nausea, dermatitis, chemical pneumonitis, unconsciousness, possible peripheral neuropathy, irritation of the eyes, nose, and throat, sleep disturbances, or reduced memory.

In a CDC study, it was found that prolonged exposure to heptane may also cause a state of intoxication and uncontrolled hilarity in some participants and a stupor lasting for 30 minutes after exposure for others. Prolonged exposure can also lead to skin dryness or cracking, since the substance defats skin.

According to information from the New Jersey Department of Health and Senior Services, n-heptane can penetrate the skin, and further health effects may occur immediately or shortly after exposure to it. Exposure to n-heptane may lead to short-term health effects like irritation of the eyes, nose, or throat, headache, dizziness, or loss of consciousness; and chronic health effects, like reduced memory and concentration, sleep disturbance, and reduced coordination due to its effects on the nervous system.
