= 2,4-Dimethylpentane =

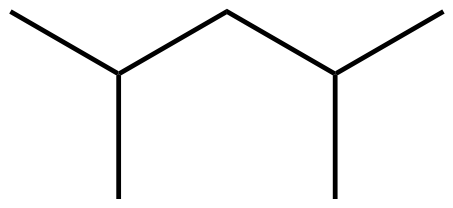

Names
- Preferred IUPAC name 2,4-Dimethylpentane

Identifiers
| CAS Number | 108-08-7 |
| 3D model (JSmol) | Interactive image |
| ChemSpider | 7619 |
| ECHA InfoCard | 100.003.226 |
| EC Number | 203-548-0 |
| PubChem CID | 7907 |
| UNII | 4JT8Q9QOHI |
| UN number | 1206 |
| CompTox Dashboard (EPA) | DTXSID2059358 |
- InChI: InChI=1S/C7H16/c1-6(2)5-7(3)4/h6-7H,5H2,1-4H3 Key: BZHMBWZPUJHVEE-UHFFFAOYSA-N
- SMILES: CC(C)CC(C)C

Properties
| Chemical formula | C_{7}H_{16} |
| Molar mass | 100.205 g·mol^{−1} |
| Appearance | Colorless liquid |
| Density | 0.6971 g/cm^{3} (0 °C) |
| Melting point | −119.9 °C (−183.8 °F; 153.2 K) |
| Boiling point | 80.4 °C (176.7 °F; 353.5 K) |

Hazards
- Occupational safety and health (OHS/OSH)
| Main hazards | inflammable |
- GHS labelling
| Pictograms | (GHS02: Flammable) (GHS07: Exclamation mark) (GHS08: Health hazard) (GHS09: Environmental hazard) |
| Signal word | Danger |
| Hazard statements | H225, H304, H315, H335, H336, H410 |
| Precautionary statements | P210, P233, P240, P241, P242, P243, P261, P264, P271, P273, P280, P301+P310, P302+P352, P303+P361+P353, P304+P340, P312, P321, P331, P332+P313, P362, P370+P378, P391, P403+P233, P403+P235, P405, P501 |
- Except where otherwise noted, data are given for materials in their standard state (at 25 °C [77 °F], 100 kPa). Infobox references

2,4-Dimethylpentane is an alkane with the chemical formula [(H_{3}C)_{2}CH]_{2}CH_{2}. This colorless hydrocarbon is produced in large quantities in oil refineries. It results from the alkylation of isobutane by propylene. Often referred to as "alkylate", it is blended with other gasoline components to give a high octane fuel. Unlike n-heptane, 2,4-dimethylpentane is a desirable fuel because its branched structure allows combustion without knocking.

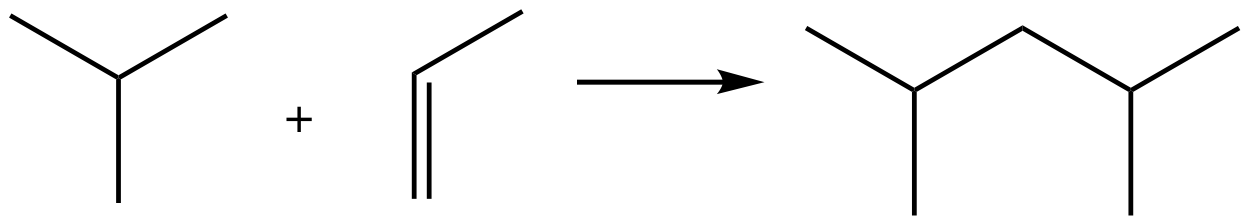
Typical acid-catalyzed route to dimethylpentane.
