= 2,2-Dimethylpentane =

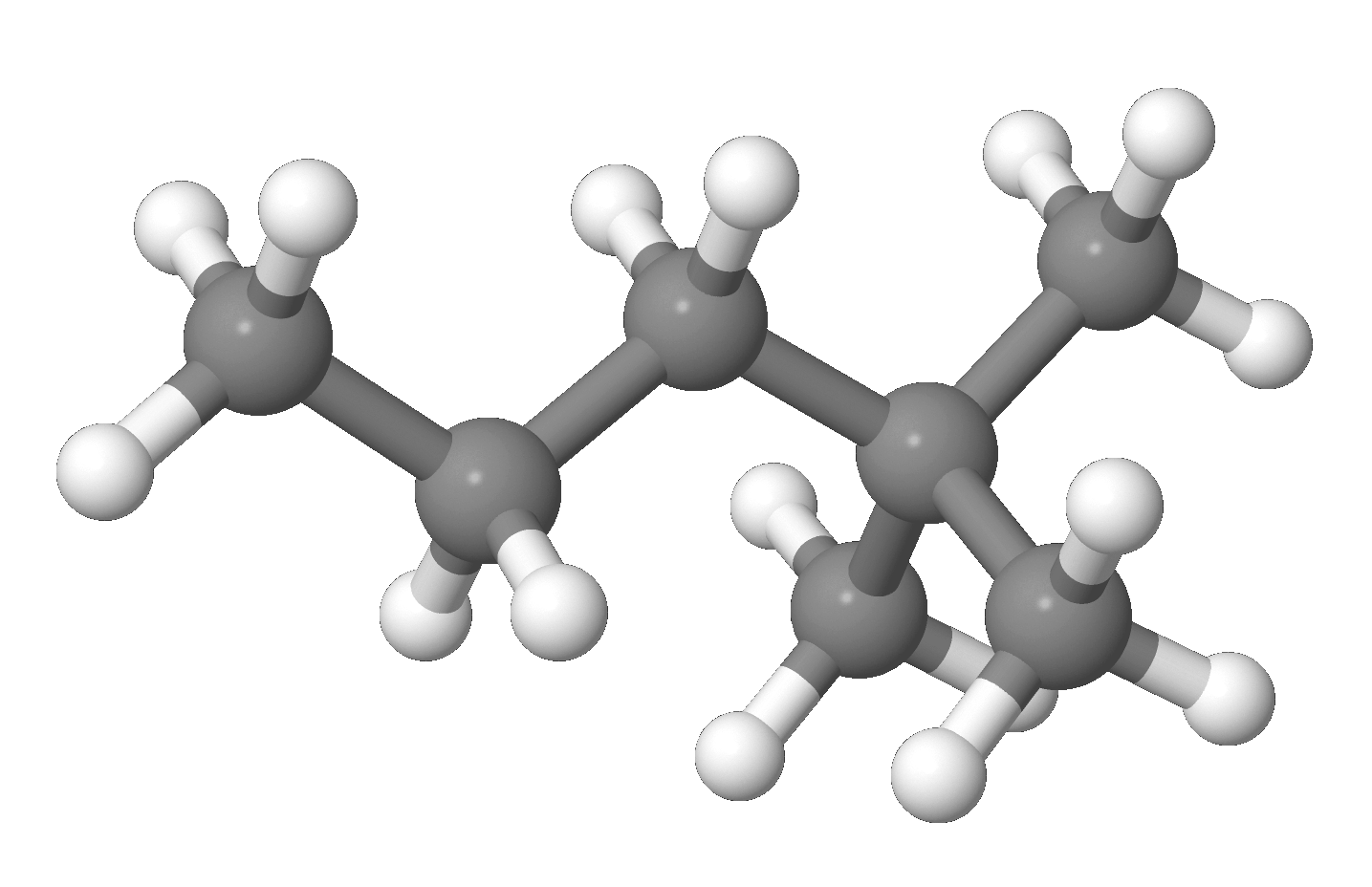
- Ball-and-Stick model of 2,2-Dimethylpentane

Names
- Preferred IUPAC name 2,2-Dimethylpentane
- Other names: Neoheptane; 2,2-DMP

Identifiers
CAS Number	590-35-2
3D model (JSmol)	Interactive image
Beilstein Reference	1730757
ChemSpider	11055
ECHA InfoCard	100.008.801
EC Number	209-680-5
PubChem CID	11542
UNII	M82T90QEVX
CompTox Dashboard (EPA)	DTXSID5060439
- InChI: InChI=1/C7H16/c1-5-6-7(2,3)4/h5-6H2,1-4H Key: CXOWYJMDMMMMJO-UHFFFAOYSA-N
- SMILES: CCCC(C)(C)C

Properties
Chemical formula	C_{7}H_{16}
Molar mass	100.205 g·mol^{−1}
Appearance	Colorless liquid
Odor	Odorless
Density	0.67385 g cm^{−3} (liquid, 20 °C, 1 atm); 0.6695 g cm^{−3} (liquid, 25 °C, 1 atm)
Melting point	−123.7 °C; −190.8 °F; 149.4 K
Boiling point	79.2 °C; 174.5 °F; 352.3 K

Structure
Dipole moment	0.0 D

Thermochemistry
Heat capacity (C)	221.12 J K^{−1} mol^{−1}
Std molar entropy (S^{⦵}_{298})	300.3 J K^{−1} mol^{−1}
Std enthalpy of formation (Δ_{f}H^{⦵}_{298})	−238.5 kJ mol^{−1}
Std enthalpy of combustion (Δ_{c}H^{⦵}_{298})	−4802.94 kJ mol^{−1}

Hazards
- GHS labelling
Pictograms	(GHS02: Flammable) (GHS07: Exclamation mark) (GHS08: Health hazard) (GHS09: Environmental hazard)
Signal word	Danger
Hazard statements	H225, H304, H315, H335, H336, H410
Precautionary statements	P210, P233, P240, P241, P242, P243, P261, P264, P271, P273, P280, P301+P310, P302+P352, P303+P361+P353, P304+P340, P312, P321, P331, P332+P313, P362, P370+P378, P391, P403+P233, P403+P235, P405, P501
Flash point	15 °C (59 °F; 288 K)
- Safety data sheet (SDS)
- Except where otherwise noted, data are given for materials in their standard state (at 25 °C [77 °F], 100 kPa). Infobox references

2,2-Dimethylpentane is one of the isomers of heptane. It is also called neoheptane as it contains the (CH_{3})_{3}C grouping. It has the most extreme properties of the isomers of heptane.

== Preparation ==
A method to produce high purity 2,2-dimethylpentane is to react the grignard reagent of n-propyl bromide (CH_{3}CH_{2}CH_{2}MgBr) with tert-butyl chloride ((CH_{3})_{3}CCl). n-PrMgCl can be used instead of the bromide.

== Properties ==
In 1929 Graham Edgar and George Calingaert made 2,2-dimethylpentane and measured its physical characteristics for the first time. The measurements were at 20 °C, not the standard conditions used in later times.

For 2,2-dimethylpentane they measured a density of 0.6737 at 20 °C with a rate of change Δd/ΔT of 0.000855. The density and boiling are the lowest of the isomers of heptane. The dielectric constant is 1.915, the lowest of the heptane isomers. The critical temperature is 247.7 °C and critical pressure 28.4 atmospheres. The refractive index at 20° is 1.38233, the same as for 2,4-dimethylpentane, equal lowest for the heptane isomers. The adiabatic compressibility is 0.0001289 and isothermal compressibility is 0.00016279 atmospheres, highest for the heptanes. The velocity of sound is 1.080 km/s which is lowest of the heptanes. Coefficient of thermal expansion is 0.001268/°, highest of the heptanes. Surface tension is 17.80 dynes/cm. Viscosity is 0.00385. The heat of combustion is 11470 cal/g which is very similar to other heptanes.

== Reactions ==
2,2-Dimethylpentane can form a clathrate hydrate with helper gas molecules. The type of clathrate formed is called "clathrate H". 2,2-Dimethylpentane was the first compound for which the structure was determined. The clathrate has 34 molecules of water per molecule, and also has xenon and hydrogen sulfide as helper molecules. The crystals are hexagonal in form and melt at 0.6 °C. This substance is important as clathrate hydrates form problems by blocking natural gas pipelines.

2,2-Dimethylpentane does not react with bromine, iodine, nitric acid or chlorosulfonic acid because there are no tertiary carbon atoms (a carbon atom with only one hydrogen attached).

Heating alkanes over an aluminium trichloride is used to reform to make different isomers. 2,2-Dimethylpentane does not participate in this process and so cannot be reformed, or created by reforming other heptanes.

== Natural occurrence ==
2,2-Dimethylpentane exists in some crude oils at low levels of about 0.01%.
