= 2,3-Dimethylpentane =

Names
- Preferred IUPAC name 2,3-Dimethylpentane

Identifiers
CAS Number	(racemic): 565-59-3; (3S): 7485-45-2; (3R): 54665-46-2
3D model (JSmol)	(racemic): Interactive image
ChEBI	(racemic): CHEBI:151115
ChemSpider	(racemic): 10786; (3S): 18527723; (3R): 553611
ECHA InfoCard	100.008.437
EC Number	(racemic): 209-280-0
PubChem CID	(racemic): 11260; (3S): 22810194; (3R): 638047
UNII	(racemic): 8HPD5L8920
UN number	1206
CompTox Dashboard (EPA)	(racemic): DTXSID20862203
- InChI: InChI=1S/C7H16/c1-5-7(4)6(2)3/h6-7H,5H2,1-4H3/t7-/m0/s1 Key: WGECXQBGLLYSFP-UHFFFAOYSA-N
- SMILES: (racemic): CCC(C)C(C)C

Properties
Chemical formula	C_{7}H_{16}
Molar mass	100.205 g·mol^{−1}
Appearance	Colourless liquid
Density	0.7076 g/mL (25 °C), 0.6413 (80 °C), 0.7380 (25 °C, 45 MPa), 0.6891 (80 °C, 45 MPa) (racemic)
Boiling point	89.7 °C (racemic)
Vapor pressure	2.35 psi (37.7 °C)
Viscosity	0.356 mPa s (30 °C), 0.232 (80 °C), 0.624 (30 °C, 60 MPa) (racemic)

Thermochemistry
Heat capacity (C)	34.308 cal/K/mol (−189 °C), 51.647 (20 °C), 58.735 (86.6 °C) (racemic)
Std molar entropy (S^{⦵}_{298})	71.02 cal/K/mol (25 °C) (racemic)

Hazards
- GHS labelling
Pictograms	(GHS02: Flammable) (GHS07: Exclamation mark) (GHS08: Health hazard) (GHS09: Environmental hazard)
Signal word	Danger
Hazard statements	H225, H304, H315, H335, H336, H410
Precautionary statements	P210, P233, P240, P241, P242, P243, P261, P264, P271, P273, P280, P301+P310, P302+P352, P303+P361+P353, P304+P340, P312, P321, P331, P332+P313, P362, P370+P378, P391, P403+P233, P403+P235, P405, P501
Flash point	−7 °C (19 °F; 266 K)
Autoignition temperature	337 °C (639 °F; 610 K)

Related compounds
- Except where otherwise noted, data are given for materials in their standard state (at 25 °C [77 °F], 100 kPa). Infobox references

2,3-Dimethylpentane is an organic compound of carbon and hydrogen with formula C_{7}H_{16}, more precisely CH_{3}–CH(CH_{3})–CH(CH_{3})–CH_{2}–CH_{3}: a molecule of pentane with methyl groups –CH_{3} replacing hydrogen atoms on carbon atoms 2 and 3. It is an alkane ("paraffin" in older nomenclature), a fully saturated hydrocarbon; specifically, one of the isomers of heptane.

Like typical alkanes, it is a colorless flammable compound; under common ambient conditions, it is a mobile liquid, less dense than water.

2,3-Dimethylpentane is notable for being one of the two simplest alkanes with optical (enantiomeric) isomerism. The optical center is the middle carbon of the pentane backbone, which is connected to one hydrogen atom, one methyl group, one ethyl group –C_{2}H_{5}, and one isopropyl group –CH(CH_{3})_{2}. The two enantiomers are denoted (3R)-2,3-dimethylpentane and (3S)-2,3-dimethylpentane (the other simplest chiral alkane is its structural isomer 3-methylhexane).

== Properties ==
Most properties listed in the literature refer to the racemic compound (an equimolar mixture of the two enantiomers).

The boiling point of 89.7 °C is 0.3 °C higher than the value of 89.4 °C predicted by Wiener's formula, based on the structure of the molecule and the boiling point of n-heptane.

The speed of sound at 3 MHz is 1149.5 m/s at 20 °C and 889.5 m/s at 80 °C.

The racemic mixture has a glass transition temperature of about 123 K (−150 °C), but reportedly it does not crystallize—a fact that has been claimed to be a characteristic of high-purity optically active alkanes.

== Preparation ==
2,3-Dimethylpentane is practically absent in the synthetic fuel produced from hydrogen and carbon monoxide by the Fischer–Tropsch process.

The pure compound can be prepared by reacting the Grignard reagent sec-butyl magnesium bromide C_{4}H_{9}–MgBr with acetone to form 2,3-dimethyl-2-pentanol, then dehydrating this alcohol to form 2,3-dimethyl-2-pentene, and hydrogenating this product.

The isomer is present at about 2.4% by weight in the hydrocarbon mixture obtained by the condensation of methanol at 200 °C with a zinc iodide catalyst (the main component of the mixture being the isomer 2,2,3-trimethylbutane, obtained at almost 50% yield).

== See also ==
- 1,2-dimethylcyclopropane (C_{5}H_{10}), the simplest chiral cycloalkane
