= Alkyl group =

Chemical group derived from alkanes (one hydrogen removed)

Isopropyl group

Methyl group

In organic chemistry, an alkyl group is an alkane missing one hydrogen atom. The term alkyl is intentionally unspecific to include many possible substitutions. An acyclic alkyl has the general formula of −C_{n}H_{2n+1}. A cycloalkyl group is derived from a cycloalkane by removal of a hydrogen atom from a ring and has the general formula −C_{n}H_{2n−1}. Typically an alkyl is a part of a larger molecule. In structural formulae, the symbol R is used to designate a generic (unspecified) alkyl group. The smallest alkyl group is methyl, with the formula −CH_{3}.

== Related concepts ==
Alkylation is the addition of alkyl groups to molecules, often by alkylating agents such as alkyl halides.

Alkylating antineoplastic agents are a class of compounds that are used to treat cancer. In such case, the term alkyl is used loosely. For example, nitrogen mustards are well-known alkylating agents, but they are not simple hydrocarbons.

In chemistry, alkyl is a group, a substituent, that is attached to other molecular fragments. For example, alkyl lithium reagents have the empirical formula Li(alkyl), where alkyl = methyl, ethyl, etc. A dialkyl ether is an ether with two alkyl groups, e.g., diethyl ether O(CH_{2}CH_{3})_{2}.

== In medicinal chemistry ==
In medicinal chemistry, the incorporation of alkyl chains into some chemical compounds increases their lipophilicity. This strategy has been used to increase the antimicrobial activity of flavanones and chalcones.

== Alkyl cations, anions, and radicals ==
Usually, alkyl groups are attached to other atoms or groups of atoms. Free alkyls occur as neutral radicals, as anions, or as cations. The cations are called carbocations. The anions are called carbanions. The neutral alkyl free radicals have no special name. Such species are usually encountered only as transient intermediates. However, persistent alkyl radicals with half-lives "from seconds to years" have been prepared. Typically alkyl cations are generated using superacids and alkyl anions are observed in the presence of strong bases. Alkyl radicals can be generated by a photochemical reaction or by homolytic cleavage. Alkyls are commonly observed in mass spectrometry of organic compounds. Simple alkyls (especially methyl) are observed in the interstellar space as well.

== Nomenclature ==
Alkyl groups form homologous series. The simplest series have the general formula −C_{n}H_{2n+1}. Alkyls include methyl, (−CH_{3}), ethyl (−C_{2}H_{5}), propyl (−C_{3}H_{7}), butyl (−C_{4}H_{9}), pentyl (−C_{5}H_{11}), and so on. Alkyl groups that contain one ring have the formula −C_{n}H_{2n−1}, e.g. cyclopropyl and cyclohexyl. The formula of alkyl radicals are the same as alkyl groups, except the free valence "−" is replaced by the dot "•" and adding "radical" to the name of the alkyl group (e.g. methyl radical •CH_{3}).

The naming convention is taken from IUPAC nomenclature:

Number of carbon atoms	1	2	3	4	5	6	7	8	9	10	11	12	13	14
Prefix	meth-	eth-	prop-	but-	pent-	hex-	hept-	oct-	non-	dec-	undec-	dodec-	tridec-	tetradec-
Group name	Methyl	Ethyl	Propyl	Butyl	Pentyl	Hexyl	Heptyl	Octyl	Nonyl	Decyl	Undecyl	Dodecyl	Tridecyl	Tetradecyl

The prefixes taken from IUPAC nomenclature are used to name branched chained structures by their substituent groups, for example 3-methylpentane:

The structure of 3-methylpentane is viewed as consisting of two parts. First, five atoms comprise the longest straight chain of carbon centers. The parent five-carbon compound is named pentane (highlighted blue). The methyl "substituent" or "group" is highlighted red. According to the usual rules of nomenclature, alkyl groups are included in the name of the molecule before the root, as in methylpentane. This name is, however, ambiguous, as the methyl branch could be on various carbon atoms. Thus, the name is 3-methylpentane to avoid ambiguity: The 3- is because the methyl is attached to the third of the five carbon atoms.

If there is more than one of the same alkyl group attached to a chain, then the prefixes are used on the alkyl groups to indicate multiples (i.e., di, tri, tetra, etc.)

This compound is known as 2,3,3-trimethylpentane. Here three identical alkyl groups attached to carbon atoms 2, 3, and 3. The numbers are included in the name to avoid ambiguity about the position of the groups, and "tri" indicates that there are three identical methyl groups. If one of the methyl groups attached to the third carbon atom were instead an ethyl group, then the name would be 3-ethyl-2,3-dimethylpentane. When there are different alkyl groups, they are listed in alphabetical order.

In addition, each position on an alkyl chain can be described according to how many other carbon atoms are attached to it. The terms primary, secondary, tertiary, and quaternary refer to a carbon attached to one, two, three, or four other carbons respectively.

C_{n}	Trivial name	Symbol	Condensed formula	IUPAC status	Preferred IUPAC name	Skeletal formula
С_{1}	methyl	Ме	−CH_{3}		methyl	
С_{2}	ethyl	Et	−CH_{2}−CH_{3}		ethyl	
С_{3}	propyl, n-propyl	Pr, ^{n}Pr, n-Pr	−CH_{2}−CH_{2}−CH_{3}		propyl	
С_{3}	isopropyl	iPr, i-Pr,^{i}Pr	−CH(−CH_{3})_{2}		2-propyl	
С_{4}	n-butyl	Bu, n-Bu, ^{n}Bu	−CH_{2}−CH_{2}−CH_{2}−CH_{3}		butyl	
С_{4}	isobutyl	iBu, i-Bu, ^{i}Bu	−CH_{2}−CH(−CH_{3})_{2}		2-methylpropyl	
С_{4}	sec-butyl	sBu, s-Bu, ^{s}Bu	−CH(−CH_{3})−CH_{2}−CH_{3}		2-butyl	
С_{4}	tert-butyl	tBu, t-Bu, ^{t}Bu	−C(−CH_{3})_{3}		tert-butyl	
С_{5}	n-pentyl, amyl	Pe, Am, nPe, n-Pe, ^{n}Pe, ^{n}Am	−CH_{2}−CH_{2}−CH_{2}−CH_{2}−CH_{3}		pentyl	
С_{5}	tert-pentyl	tPe, t-Pe, ^{t}Pe	−C(−CH_{3})_{2}−CH_{2}−CH_{3}	No longer recommended	2-methylbutan-2-yl (aka 1,1-dimethylpropyl)	
С_{5}	neopentyl		−CH_{2}−C(−CH_{3})_{3}	No longer recommended	2,2-dimethylpropyl	
С_{5}	isopentyl, isoamyl		−CH_{2}−CH_{2}−CH(−CH_{3})_{2}	No longer recommended	3-methylbutyl	
С_{5}	sec-pentyl	sPe, s-Pe, ^{s}Pe	−CH(−CH_{3})−CH_{2}−CH_{2}−CH_{3}		pentan-2-yl(or (1-Methylbutyl))	
С_{5}	3-pentyl		−CH(−CH_{2}−CH_{3})_{2}		pentan-3-yl (also known as (1-Ethylpropyl))	
С_{5}	sec-isopentyl, sec-isoamyl, siamyl	Sia	−CH(−CH_{3})−CH(−CH_{3})_{2}		3-methylbutan-2-yl (or (1,2-Dimethylpropyl))	
С_{5}	active pentyl		−CH_{2}−CH(−CH_{3})−CH_{2}−CH_{3}		2-methylbutyl	

== Etymology ==
The first named alkyl radical was ethyl, named so by Liebig in 1833 from the German word "Äther" (which in turn had been derived from the Greek word "aither" meaning "air", for the substance now known as diethyl ether) and the Greek word ύλη (hyle), meaning "matter". This was followed by methyl (Dumas and Peligot in 1834, meaning "spirit of wood") and amyl (Auguste Cahours in 1840). The word alkyl was introduced by Johannes Wislicenus in or before 1882, based on the German word "Alkoholradikale" and then-common suffix -yl.

== See also ==
- Alkane
- Alkene
- Alkyne
- Aryl
- Hydrocarbon
- IUPAC nomenclature of organic chemistry
