= C6H14 =

The molecular formula C_{6}H_{14} (molar mass: 86.17 g/mol) may refer to:

- Dimethylbutanes
  - 2,2-Dimethylbutane
  - 2,3-Dimethylbutane
- Hexane
- Methylpentanes
  - 2-Methylpentane
  - 3-Methylpentane
