= 2-Methylhexane =

- Skeletal formula of 2-methylhexane

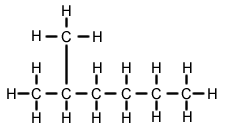
- Skeletal formula of 2-methylhexane with all implicit carbons shown, and all explicit hydrogens added

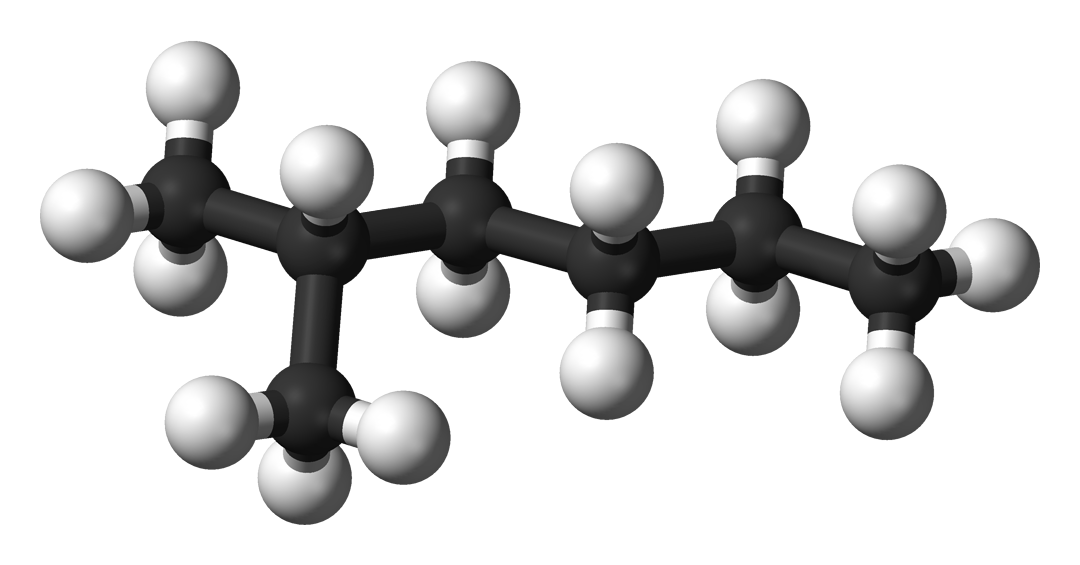
- Ball and stick model of 2-methylhexane

Names
- Preferred IUPAC name 2-Methylhexane

Identifiers
CAS Number	591-76-4
3D model (JSmol)	Interactive image
Beilstein Reference	1696856
ChemSpider	11094
ECHA InfoCard	100.008.847
EC Number	209-730-6
PubChem CID	11582
RTECS number	MO3871500
UNII	YI4679P2SP
UN number	3295
CompTox Dashboard (EPA)	DTXSID5052256
- InChI: InChI=1S/C7H16/c1-4-5-6-7(2)3/h7H,4-6H2,1-3H3 Key: GXDHCNNESPLIKD-UHFFFAOYSA-N
- SMILES: CCCCC(C)C

Properties
Chemical formula	C_{7}H_{16}
Molar mass	100.205 g·mol^{−1}
Appearance	Colorless liquid
Odor	Odorless
Density	0.679 g cm^{−3}
Melting point	−119.0 to −117.8 °C; −182.3 to −180.1 °F; 154.1 to 155.3 K
Boiling point	89.6 to 90.6 °C; 193.2 to 195.0 °F; 362.7 to 363.7 K
Vapor pressure	15.7 kPa (at 37.7 °C)
Henry's law constant (k_{H})	19 nmol Pa^{−1} kg^{−1}
Magnetic susceptibility (χ)	−86.24·10^{−6} cm^{3}/mol
Refractive index (n_{D})	1.384

Thermochemistry
Heat capacity (C)	222.92 J K^{−1} mol^{−1}
Std molar entropy (S^{⦵}_{298})	323.34 J K^{−1} mol^{−1}
Std enthalpy of formation (Δ_{f}H^{⦵}_{298})	−231.1 – −228.5 kJ mol^{−1}
Std enthalpy of combustion (Δ_{c}H^{⦵}_{298})	−4.8127 – −4.8103 MJ mol^{−1}

Hazards
- GHS labelling
Pictograms	(GHS02: Flammable) (GHS07: Exclamation mark) (GHS08: Health hazard) (GHS09: Environmental hazard)
Signal word	Danger
Hazard statements	H225, H304, H315, H336, H410
Precautionary statements	P210, P261, P273, P301+P310, P331
NFPA 704 (fire diamond)	2 3 0
Flash point	−1 °C (30 °F; 272 K)
Autoignition temperature	280 °C (536 °F; 553 K)
Explosive limits	1–7%

Related compounds
Related alkanes	2-Methylpentane; 3-Methylpentane; 3-Ethylpentane; 3-Methylhexane; 2-Methylheptane; 3-Methylheptane
Related compounds	2-Ethyl-1-butanol; Valnoctamide; 2-Ethylhexanol; Valpromide; 2-Ethylhexanoic acid
- Except where otherwise noted, data are given for materials in their standard state (at 25 °C [77 °F], 100 kPa). verify (what is ?) Infobox references

2-Methylhexane (C_{7}H_{16}, also known as isoheptane, ethylisobutylmethane) is an isomer of heptane. It is structurally a hexane molecule with a methyl group attached to its second carbon atom. It exists in most commercially available heptane merchandises as an impurity but is usually not considered as impurity in terms of reactions since it has very similar physical and chemical properties when compared to n-heptane (straight-chained heptane).

Being an alkane, 2-methylhexane is insoluble in water, but is soluble in many organic solvents, such as alcohols and ether. However, 2-methylhexane is more commonly considered as a solvent itself. Therefore, even though it is present in many commercially available heptane products, it is not considered as a destructive impurity, as heptane is usually used as a solvent. Nevertheless, by concise processes of distillation and refining, it is possible to separate 2-methylhexane from n-heptane.

Within a group of isomers, those with more branches tend to ignite more easily and combust more completely. Therefore, 2-methylhexane has a lower Autoignition temperature and flash point when compared to heptane. Theoretically 2-methylhexane also burns with a less sooty flame, emitting higher-frequency radiation; however, as heptane and 2-methylhexane differ by only one carbon atom, in terms of branching, both burn with a bright yellow flame when ignited.

Compared to n-heptane, 2-methylhexane has lower melting and boiling points. 2-methylhexane is also less dense than heptane.

On the NFPA 704 scale, 2-methylhexane is listed as a reactivity level-0 chemical, along with various other alkanes. In fact, most alkanes are unreactive except in extreme conditions, such as combustion or strong sunlight. At the presence of oxygen and flame, 2-methylhexane, like heptane, combusts mostly completely into water and carbon dioxide. With UV-light and mixed with halogens in solvents, usually bromine in 1,1,1-trichloroethane, a substitution reaction occurs.

== See also ==
- 3-Methylhexane
