= Methylpentane =

Methylpentane may refer to:

- 2-Methylpentane
- 3-Methylpentane

== See also ==
- Methylpentenone
