= Natural gasoline =

Liquid hydrocarbon mixture condensed from natural gas

Natural gasoline is a liquid hydrocarbon mixture condensed from natural gas, similar to common gasoline (petrol) derived from petroleum.

The chemical composition of natural gasoline is mostly five- and six-carbon alkanes (pentanes and hexanes) with smaller amounts of alkanes with longer chains. It contains significant amounts of isopentane (methyl butane) CH(CH_{3})_{2}(C_{2}H_{5}), which is rare in the petroleum product. Its boiling point is within the standard range for gasoline, and its vapor pressure is intermediate between those of natural gas condensate (drip gas) and liquefied petroleum gas. Its typical gravity is around 80 API.

Natural gasoline is rather volatile and unstable, and has a low octane rating, but can be blended with other hydrocarbons to produce commercial gasoline. It is also used as a solvent to extract oil from oil shale. Its properties are standardized by GPA Midstream (formerly Gas Processors Association).

== Uses ==
Natural gasoline is often used as a denaturant for fuel-grade ethanol, where it is commonly added volumetrically between 2.0% and 2.5% to make denatured fuel ethanol (DFE), or E98. This process renders the fuel-grade ethanol undrinkable. It is then transferred to a blender, which will add this E98 to conventional gasoline to make common 87 octane fuels (E10). It can also be added to ethanol in higher volumetric concentrations to produce high-level blends of ethanol, such as E85. Natural gasoline has a lower octane content (RON roughly equal to 70) than conventional commercial distilled gasoline, so it cannot normally be used by itself for fuel for modern automobiles. However, when mixed with higher concentrations of ethanol (RON roughly equal to 113) to produce products such as E85, the octane level of the natural gasoline and ethanol mixture is now within the usable range for flex-fuel vehicles.

== Sources ==
It may be sourced from production of natural-gas wells (see "drip gas") or produced by extraction processes in the field, as opposed to refinery cracking of conventional gasoline.
