= Hydrocarbon dew point =

Temperature at which hydrocarbons condense

The hydrocarbon dew point is the temperature (at a given pressure) at which the hydrocarbon components of any hydrocarbon-rich gas mixture, such as natural gas, will start to condense out of the gaseous phase. It is often also referred to as the HDP or the HCDP. The maximum temperature at which such condensation takes place is called the cricondentherm. The hydrocarbon dew point is a function of the gas composition as well as the pressure.

The hydrocarbon dew point is universally used in the natural gas industry as an important quality parameter, stipulated in contractual specifications and enforced throughout the natural gas supply chain, from producers through processing, transmission and distribution companies to final end users.

The hydrocarbon dew point of a gas is a different concept from the water dew point, the latter being the temperature (at a given pressure) at which water vapor present in a gas mixture will condense out of the gas.

== Relation to the term GPM ==
In the United States, the hydrocarbon dew point of processed, pipelined natural gas is related to and characterized by the term GPM which is the gallons of liquefiable hydrocarbons contained in 1,000 cubic feet (28 m^{3}) of natural gas at a stated temperature and pressure. When the liquefiable hydrocarbons are characterized as being hexane or higher molecular weight components, they are reported as GPM (C6+).

However, the quality of raw produced natural gas is also often characterized by the term GPM meaning the gallons of liquefiable hydrocarbons contained in 1,000 cubic feet (28 m^{3}) of the raw natural gas. In such cases, when the liquefiable hydrocarbons in the raw natural gas are characterized as being ethane or higher molecular weight components, they are reported as GPM (C2+). Similarly, when characterized as being propane or higher molecular weight components, they are reported as GPM (C3+).

Care must be taken not to confuse the two different definitions of the term GPM.

Although GPM is an additional parameter of some value, most pipeline operators and others who process, transport, distribute or use natural gas are primarily interested in the actual HCDP, rather than GPM. Furthermore, GPM and HCDP are not interchangeable and one should be careful not to confuse what each one exactly means.

== Methods of HCDP determination ==
There are primarily two categories of HCDP determination. One category involves "theoretical" methods, and the other involves "experimental" methods.

=== Theoretical methods ===
The theoretical methods use the component analysis of the gas mixture (usually via gas chromatography, GC) and then use an equation of state (EOS) to calculate what the dew point of the mixture should be at a given pressure. The Peng–Robinson and Kwong–Redlich–Soave equations of state are the most commonly used for determining the HCDP in the natural gas industry.

The theoretical methods using GC analysis suffer from four sources of error:

- The first source of error is the sampling error. Pipelines operate at high pressure. To do an analysis using a field GC, the pressure has to be regulated down to close to atmospheric pressure. In the process of reducing pressure, some of the heavier components may drop out, particularly if the pressure reduction is done in the retrograde region. Therefore, the gas reaching the GC is fundamentally different (usually leaner in the heavy components) than the actual gas in the pipeline. Alternatively, if a sample bottle is collected for delivery to a laboratory for analysis, significant care must be taken not to introduce any contaminants to the sample, to make sure that the sample bottle represents the actual gas in the pipeline, and to extract the complete sample correctly in to the laboratory GC.
- The second source is the error on the analysis of the gas mix components. A typical field GC will have at best (under ideal conditions and frequent calibration) ~2% (of range) error in the quantity of each gas analyzed. Since the range for most field-GCs for C6 components is 0-1 mol%, there will be about 0.02 mol% uncertainty in the quantity of C6+ components. While this error does not change the heating value by much, it will introduce a significant error in the HCDP determination. Furthermore, since the exact distribution of C6+ components is an unknown (the amount of C6, C7, C8, ...), this further introduces additional errors in any HCDP calculations. When using a C6+ GC these errors can be as high as 100 °F or more, depending on the gas mixture and the assumptions made regarding the composition of the C6+ fraction. For "pipeline quality" natural gas, a C9+ GC analysis may reduce the uncertainty, because it eliminates the C6-C8 distribution error. However, independent studies have shown that the cumulative error can still be very significant, in some cases in excess of 30 C. A laboratory C12+ GC analysis using a Flame Ionization Detector (FID) can reduce the error further. However, using a C12 laboratory system can introduce additional errors, namely sampling error. If the gas has to be collected in a sample bottle and shipped to a laboratory for C12 analysis, sampling errors can be significant. Obviously there is also a lag time error between the time the sample was collected and the time it was analyzed.
- The third source of errors is calibration errors. All GCs have to be calibrated routinely with a calibration gas representative of the gas under analysis. If the calibration gas is not representative, or calibrations are not routinely performed, there will be errors introduced.
- The fourth source of error relates to the errors embedded in the equation of state model used to calculate the dew point. Different models are prone to varying amounts error at different pressure regimes and gas mixes. There is sometimes a significant divergence of calculated dew point based solely on the choice of equation of state used.

The significant advantage of using the theoretical models is that the HCDP at several pressures (as well as the cricondentherm) can be determined from a single analysis. This provides for operational uses such as determining the phase of the stream flowing through the flow-meter, determining if the sample has been affected by ambient temperature in the sample system, and avoiding amine foaming from liquid hydrocarbons in the amine contactor. However, recent developments in combining experimental methods and software enhancements have eliminated this shortcoming (see combined experimental and theoretical approach below).

GC vendors with a product targeting the HCDP analysis include Emerson, ABB, Thermo-fisher, as well as other companies.

=== Experimental methods ===
In the "experimental" methods, one actually cools a surface on which gas condenses and then measures the temperature at which the condensation takes place. The experimental methods can be divided into manual and automated systems. Manual systems, such as the Bureau of Mines dewpoint tester, depend on an operator to manually cool the chilled mirror slowly and to visually detect the onset of condensation. The automated methods use automatic mirror chilling controls and sensors to detect the amount of light reflected by the mirror and detect when condensation occurs through changes in the reflected light. The chilled mirror technique is a first principle measurement. Depending on the specific method used to establish the dew point temperature, some correction calculations may be necessary. As condensation must necessarily have already occurred for it to be detected, the reported temperature is lower than when using theoretical methods.

Similar to GC analysis, the experimental method is subject to potential sources of error. The first error is in the detection of condensation. A key component in chilled mirror dew point measurements is the subtlety with which condensate can be detected — in other words, the thinner the film is when detected, the better. A manual chilled mirror device relies on the operator to determine when a mist has formed on the mirror, and, depending on the device, can be highly subjective. It is also not always clear what is condensing: water or hydrocarbons. Because of the low resolution that has traditionally been available, the operator has been prone to under report the dew point, in other words, to report the dew point temperature as being below what it actually is. This is due to the fact that by the time condensation had accumulated enough to be visible, the dew point had already been reached and passed. The most modern manual devices make possible greatly improved reporting accuracy. There are two manufacturers of manual devices, and each of their devices meet the requirements for dew point measurement apparatus as defined in the ASTM Manual for Hydrocarbon Analysis. However, there are significant differences between the devices – including the optical resolution of the mirror and the method of mirror cooling – depending on the manufacturer.

Automated chilled mirror devices provide significantly more repeatable results, but these measurements can be affected by contaminants that may compromise the mirror's surface, although in the latest analyzers this error is eliminated using spectroscopic techniques. In many instances it is important to incorporate an effective filtration system that prepares the gas for analysis. On the other hand, filtration may alter the gas composition slightly and filter elements are subject to clogging and saturation. Advances in technology have led to analyzers that are less affected by contaminants and certain devices can also measure the dew point of water that may be present in the gas. One recent innovation is the use of spectroscopy to determine the nature of the condensate at dewpoint. Another device user laser interferometry to register extremely tenuous amounts of condensation. It is asserted that these technologies are less affected by interference from contaminants. Another source of error is the speed of the cooling of the mirror and the measurement of the temperature of the mirror when the condensation is detected. This error can be minimized by controlling the cooling speed, or having a fast condensation detection system.

Experimental methods only provide a HCDP at the pressure at which the measurement is taken, and cannot provide the cricondentherm or the HCDP at other pressures. As the cricondentherm of natural gas is typically around 27 bar, there are gas preparation systems currently available which adjust input pressure to this value. Although, as pipeline operators often wish to know the HCDP at their current line pressure, the input pressure of many experimental systems can be adjusted by a regulator.

There are instruments that can be operated in either manual or automatic mode from the Vympel company.

Companies who offer an automated chilled mirror system include: Vympel, Ametek, Michell Instruments, and Bartec Benke (Model: Hygrophil HCDT). ZEGAZ Instruments offers analyzers that use the spectroscoic approach to improve accuracy and minimize contamination issues.

=== Combined experimental and theoretical approach ===
A recent innovation is to combine the experimental method with theoretical. If the composition of the gas is analyzed by a C6+ GC, and a dewpoint is experimentally measured at any pressure, then the experimental dewpoint can be used in combination with the GC analysis to provide a more exact phase diagram. This approach overcome the main shortcoming of the experimental method which is not knowing the whole phase diagram. An example of this software is provided by Starling Associates.

== See also ==
- Natural-gas processing
- Natural-gas condensate
