= Natural-gas condensate =

Low-density mixture of hydrocarbon liquids

Natural-gas condensate, also called natural-gas liquids, is a low-density mixture of hydrocarbon liquids that are present as gaseous components in the raw natural gas produced from many natural-gas fields. Some gas species within the raw natural gas will condense to a liquid state if the temperature is reduced to below the hydrocarbon dew point temperature at a set pressure.

The natural-gas condensate is also called condensate, or gas condensate, or sometimes natural gasoline because it contains hydrocarbons within the gasoline boiling range, and is also referred to by the shortened name condy by many workers on gas installations. Raw natural gas used to create condensate may come from any type of gas well such as:

- Crude oil wells: Natural gas that comes from crude oil wells is typically called associated gas. This gas could exist as a separate gas cap above the crude oil in the underground reservoir or could be dissolved in the crude oil, ultimately coming out of solution as the pressure is reduced during production. Condensate produced from oil wells is often referred to as lease condensate.
- Dry gas wells: These wells typically produce only raw natural gas that contains no condensate with little-to-no crude oil and are called non-associated gas. Condensate from dry gas is extracted at gas-processing plants and is often called plant condensate.
- Condensate wells: These wells typically produce raw natural gas along with natural-gas liquid with little-to-no crude oil and are called non-associated gas. Such raw natural gas is often referred to as wet gas.

== Composition ==
There are many condensate sources, and each has its own unique gas-condensate composition. In general, gas condensate has a specific gravity ranging from 0.5 to 0.8, and is composed of hydrocarbons such as propane, butane, pentane, and hexane. Natural-gas compounds with more than four carbon atoms exist as liquids at ambient temperatures and pressures. Propane, butane, and isobutane are liquid at normal temperatures only under pressure. Additionally, condensate may contain:

- Heavier straight-chain alkanes having from 7 to 12 carbon atoms (denoted as C_{7} to C_{12})
- Hydrogen sulfide (H_{2}S)
- Thiols, traditionally also called mercaptans (denoted as RSH, where R is an organic group such as methyl, ethyl, etc.)
- Carbon dioxide (CO_{2})
- Cyclohexane and perhaps other naphthenes
- BTX (Aromatics such as benzene, toluene, xylenes, and ethylbenzene)

== Separating from raw natural gas ==
Schematic flow diagram of the separation of condensate from raw natural gas

There are hundreds of different equipment configurations to separate natural-gas condensate from raw natural gas. The schematic flow diagram to the right depicts just one of the possible configurations.

The raw natural-gas feedstock from a gas well or a group of wells is cooled to lower the gas temperature to below its hydrocarbon dew point at the feedstock pressure. This condenses a large part of the gas-condensate hydrocarbons. The feedstock mixture of gas, liquid condensate, and water is then routed to a high-pressure separator vessel, where the water and the raw natural gas are separated and removed. If a pressure boost is required, then the raw natural gas from the high-pressure separator is sent to the main gas compressor, which raises the pressure of the gases to whatever pressure is required for the pipeline transportation of the gas to the raw natural-gas processing plant. The main gas-compressor discharge pressure will depend upon the operating pressure of, and the distance to, the raw natural -gas processing plant and may require a multi-stage compressor.

The gas condensate from the high-pressure separator flows through a throttling control valve to a low-pressure separator. The reduction in pressure across the control valve causes the condensate to undergo a partial vaporization referred to as flash vaporization. The raw natural gas from the low-pressure separator is sent to a "booster" compressor that raises the gas pressure and sends it through a cooler, and then to the main gas compressor.

At the raw natural-gas processing plant, the gas will be dehydrated, and acid gases and other impurities will be removed from the gas. Then, the ethane (C_{2}), propane (C_{3}), butanes (C_{4}), and pentanes (C_{5})—plus higher molecular weight hydrocarbons referred to as C_{5+}—will also be removed and recovered as byproducts.

The water removed from both the high- and low-pressure separators may need to be processed to remove hydrogen sulfide (H_{2}S) before the water can be disposed of underground or reused in some fashion.

Some of the raw natural gas may be re-injected into the producing formation to help maintain the reservoir pressure, or for storage pending later installation of a pipeline.

== Dangers ==
Natural-gas condensate is generally more flammable and explosive than normal crude oil. Operating in areas where condensate has escaped is dangerous for crew due to the danger of explosions, oxygen displacement, and the threat of asphyxiating and anaesthetizing, which can occur within a few human breaths.

== Uses ==
=== Diluent in heavy-oil production ===
Because condensate is typically liquid in ambient conditions and also has very low viscosity, condensate is often used to dilute highly-viscous heavier oils that cannot otherwise be efficiently transported via pipelines. In particular, condensate is frequently mixed with bitumen from oil sands to create dilbit. In 2013, the increased use of condensate as diluent significantly increased its price in certain regions.

=== Denatured fuel alcohol ===
Drip gas, so named because it can be drawn off the bottom of small chambers (called drips) sometimes installed in pipelines from gas wells, is another name for natural-gas condensate, a naturally occurring form of gasoline obtained as a byproduct of natural gas extraction. It is also known as "condensate", "natural gasoline", "casing head gas", "raw gas", "white gas" and "liquid gold". Drip gas is defined in the United States Code of Federal Regulations as consisting of butane, pentane, and hexane hydrocarbons. Within set ranges of distillation, drip gas may be extracted and used to denature fuel alcohol. Drip gas is also used as a cleaner and solvent as well as a lantern and stove fuel.

=== Historical in vehicles ===
Some early internal combustion engines—such as the first types made by Karl Benz, and early Wright brothers aircraft engines—used natural gasoline, which could be either drip gas or a similar range of hydrocarbons distilled from crude oil. Natural gasoline has an octane rating of about 30 to 50, which is enough for the low-compression engines of the early 20th century. By 1930, improved engines and higher compression ratios required higher-octane, refined gasolines to produce power without knocking or detonation.

Beginning in the Great Depression, drip gas was used as a replacement for commercial gasoline by people in oil-producing areas. "In the days of simple engines in automobiles and farm tractors it was not uncommon for anyone having access to a condensate well to fill his tank with 'drip,'" according to the Oklahoma Historical Society. Sometimes it worked fine. "At other times it might cause thundering backfires and clouds of foul-smelling smoke."

Certain manufacturers such as John Deere made farm tractors specifically designed to run on heavy, low-octane fuels which were commonly called "distillate" or "tractor fuel". Other names were tractor vaporising oil (United Kingdom) and "power kerosene" (Australia). Often the tractors were referred to as "all-fuel". The most important factor in burning heavy fuels in a spark-ignition engine is proper fuel vaporization. Tractors designed to run on those fuels usually used a "hot" intake air manifold that allowed exhaust heat to warm the manifold and carburetor to aid vaporization. Given the poor vaporization at low temperatures, all-fuel tractors were started on gasoline, then switched to the heavy fuel. They were equipped with a small gasoline tank and a large fuel tank, both of which fed into a common valve supplying the fuel to the carburetor.

The engine would be started on gasoline, and the tractor would then be worked until the engine was sufficiently warm to change over. At that point, the fuel valve would be turned to switch the fuel supply from the gasoline tank to the fuel tank, and the heavy fuel would flow to the carburetor. Shutters or curtains were typically used to restrict airflow to the radiator, keeping the engine sufficiently hot for efficient operation. Coolant temperatures in the 200 °F (93 °C) range were normal. John Deere two-cylinder all-fuel tractors worked well on heavy fuel, as their long piston strokes, slow engine speeds, and low compression ratios allowed for effective use of the fuel. Most were also equipped with thermosiphon cooling systems that used no water pumps. Natural convection allowed the water to flow up and out of the engine block and into the top of the radiator, where it cooled and dropped and fell to continue the cycle.

Woody Guthrie's autobiographical novel Seeds of Man begins with Woody and his uncle Jeff tapping a natural-gas pipeline for drip gas. The gas also has a mention in Terrence Malick's movie Badlands.

Drip gas was sold commercially at gas stations and hardware stores in North America until the early 1950s. The white gas sold today is a similar product but is produced at refineries with benzene, a carcinogen, removed.

In 1975, the New Mexico State Police's drip-gas detail – three men in pickup trucks – began patrolling oil and gas fields, catching thieves and recovering barrels of stolen gas. The detail stopped its work in 1987.

The use of drip gas in cars and trucks is now illegal in many states. It is also harmful to modern engines due to its low octane rating, much higher combustion temperature than that of gasoline, and lack of additives. It has a distinctive smell when used as a fuel, which allowed police to sometimes catch people using drip gas illegally.
