= Valnoctamide =

- Skeletal formula of valnoctamide Skeletal structure of valnoctamide

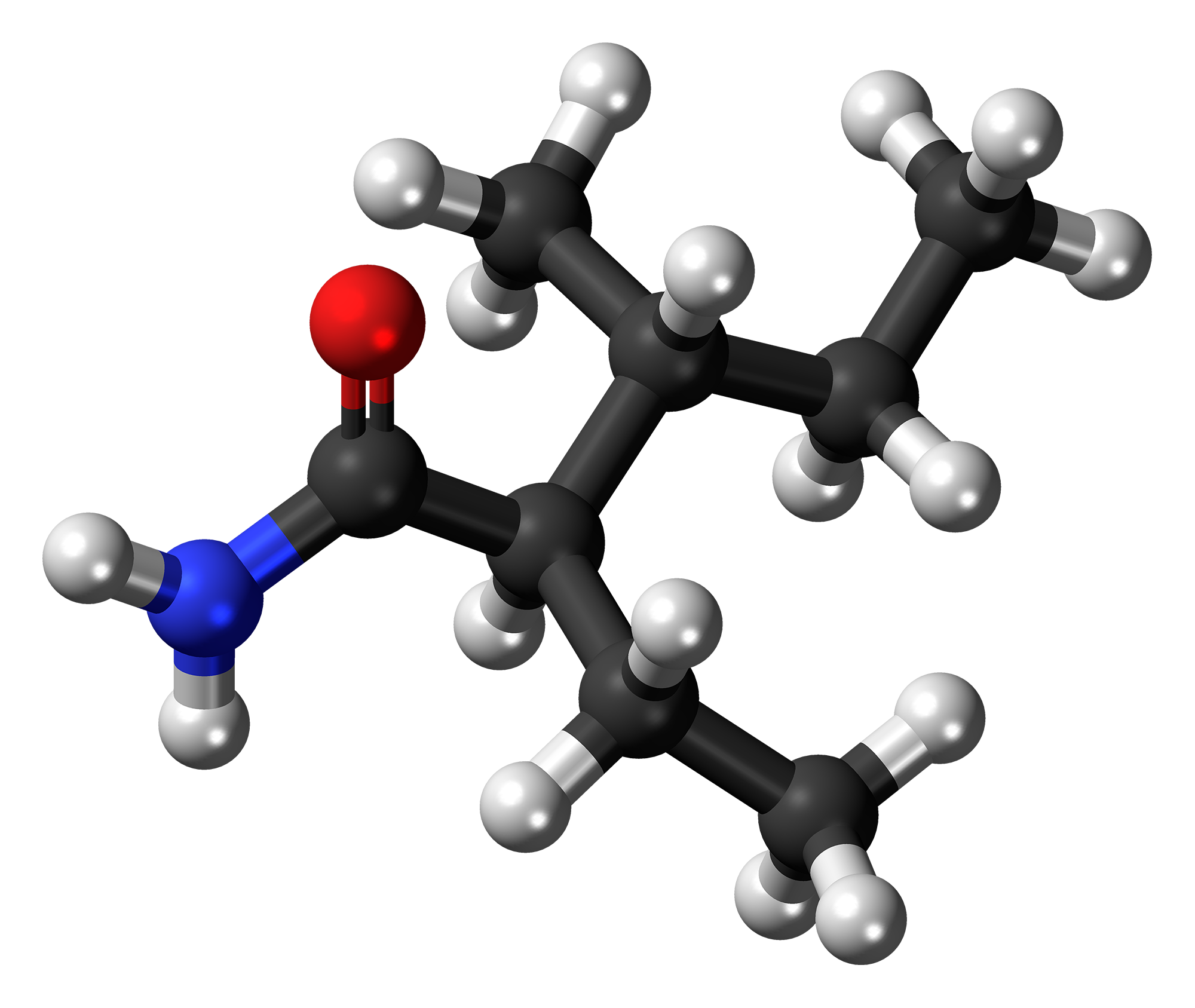
- 3D representation of an (R,R)-valnoctamide molecule

Names
- Preferred IUPAC name 2-Ethyl-3-methylpentanamide

Identifiers
CAS Number	4171-13-5
3D model (JSmol)	Interactive image
ChEMBL	ChEMBL1075733
ChemSpider	18974; 8488661 2R,3S
ECHA InfoCard	100.021.849
EC Number	224-033-7
KEGG	D02717
MeSH	valnoctamide
PubChem CID	20140; 36689722 2R,3R; 10313196 2R,3S; 25271745 2S,3R; 12015994 2S,3S
RTECS number	YV5950000
UNII	3O25NRX9YG
CompTox Dashboard (EPA)	DTXSID40863333
- InChI: InChI=1S/C8H17NO/c1-4-6(3)7(5-2)8(9)10/h6-7H,4-5H2,1-3H3,(H2,9,10) Key: QRCJOCOSPZMDJY-UHFFFAOYSA-N
- SMILES: CCC(C)C(CC)C(N)=O

Properties
Chemical formula	C_{8}H_{17}NO
Molar mass	143.230 g·mol^{−1}
Appearance	White crystals
log P	1.885

Pharmacology
ATC code	N05CM13 (WHO)
Routes of administration	Intravenous; Oral
- Pharmacokinetics
Bioavailability	94%
Metabolism	Hepatic
Biological half-life	10 hours

Hazards
- GHS labelling
Pictograms	(GHS07: Exclamation mark)
Signal word	Warning
Hazard statements	H302
- Lethal dose or concentration (LD, LC)
LD_{50} (median dose)	760 mg kg^{−1} (oral, rat)

Related compounds
Related alkanamides	Valpromide
Related compounds	2-Methylpentane; 3-Methylpentane; 3-Ethylpentane; 2-Ethyl-1-butanol; 2-Methylhexane; 3-Methylhexane; 2-Methylheptane; 3-Methylheptane; 2-Ethylhexanol; 2-Ethylhexanoic acid
- Except where otherwise noted, data are given for materials in their standard state (at 25 °C [77 °F], 100 kPa). verify (what is ?) Infobox references

Valnoctamide (INN, USAN) has been used in France as a sedative-hypnotic since 1964. It is a structural isomer of valpromide, a valproic acid prodrug; unlike valpromide, however, valnoctamide is not transformed into its homologous acid, valnoctic acid, in vivo.

== Indications ==
In addition to being a sedative, valnoctamide has been investigated for use in epilepsy.

It was studied for neuropathic pain in 2005 by Winkler et al., with good results: it had minimal effects on motor coordination and alertness at effective doses, and appeared to be equally effective as gabapentin.

RH Belmaker, Yuly Bersudsky and Alex Mishory started a clinical trial of valnoctamide for prophylaxis of mania in lieu of the much more teratogenic valproic acid or its salts.

== Side effects ==
The side effects of valnoctamide are mostly minor and include somnolence and the slight motor impairments mentioned above.

== Interactions ==
Valnoctamide is known to increase through inhibition of epoxide hydrolase the serum levels of carbamazepine-10,11-epoxide, the active metabolite of carbamazepine, sometimes to toxic levels.

== Chemistry ==
Valnoctamide is a racemic compound with four stereoisomers, all of which were shown to be more effective than valproic acid in animal models of epilepsy and one of which [(2S,3S]-valnoctamide) was considered to be a good candidate by Isoherranen, et al. for an anticonvulsant in August 2003.

Butabarbital can be hydrolyzed to Valnoctamide.
