= 3-Methylhexane =

- Skeletal formula of 3-methylhexane

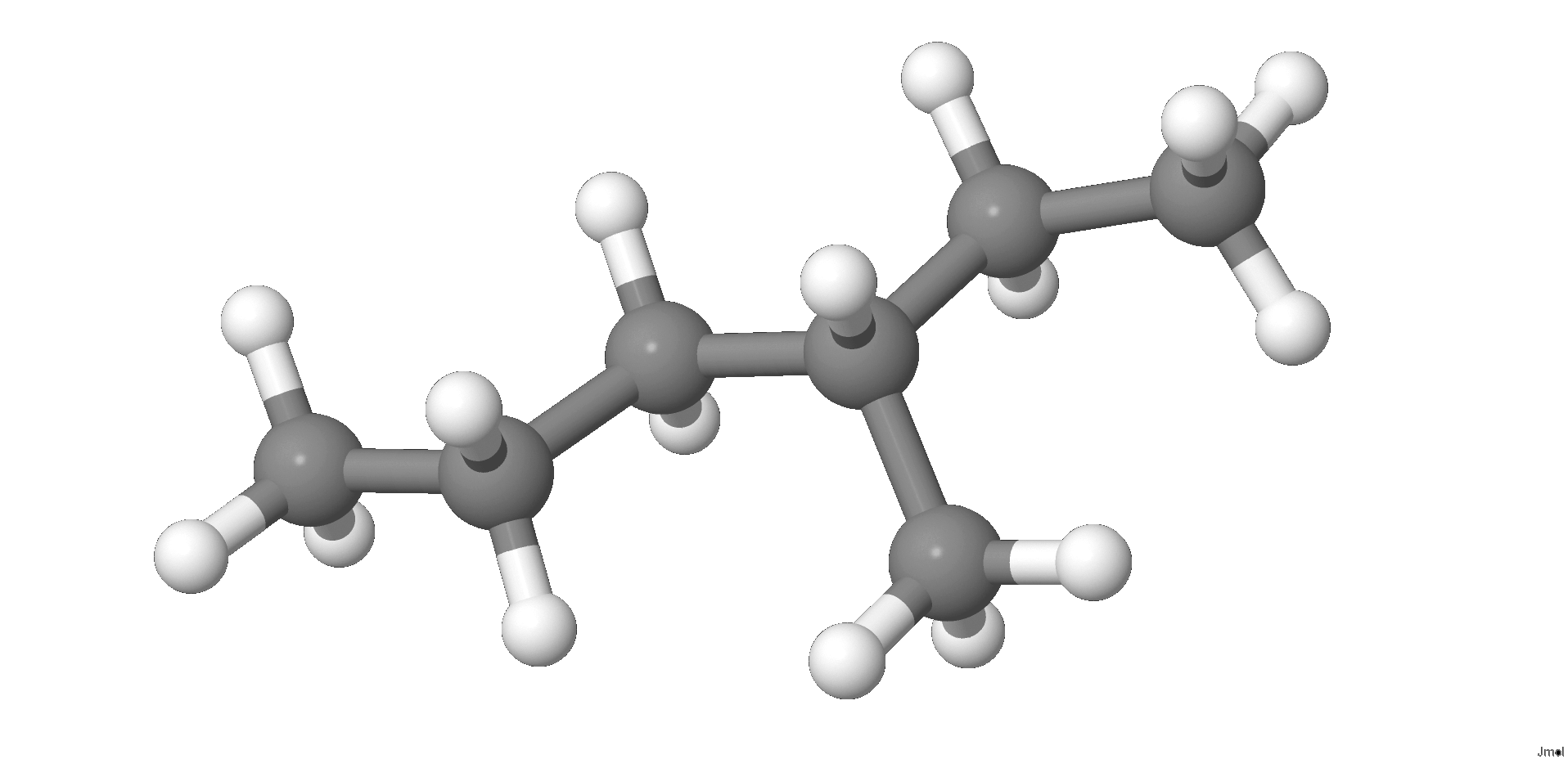
- Ball-and-Stick model of 3-methylhexane

Names
- Preferred IUPAC name 3-Methylhexane

Identifiers
CAS Number	589-34-4; (R): 78918-91-9; (S): 6131-24-4
3D model (JSmol)	Interactive image; (R): Interactive image; (S): Interactive image
Beilstein Reference	1718739
ChEBI	CHEBI:143848
ChEMBL	ChEMBL31377
ChemSpider	11023; (R): 21428376; (S): 553610
ECHA InfoCard	100.008.768
EC Number	209-643-3
PubChem CID	11507; (R): 13800357; (S): 638046
UNII	1J3ZK6L6VY; (R): 597F91020C; (S): 66M56682SH
UN number	1206
CompTox Dashboard (EPA)	DTXSID3044334
- InChI: InChI=1S/C7H16/c1-4-6-7(3)5-2/h7H,4-6H2,1-3H3 Key: VLJXXKKOSFGPHI-UHFFFAOYSA-N; (R): InChI=1S/C7H16/c1-4-6-7(3)5-2/h7H,4-6H2,1-3H3/t7-/m1/s1 Key: VLJXXKKOSFGPHI-SSDOTTSWSA-N; (S): InChI=1S/C7H16/c1-4-6-7(3)5-2/h7H,4-6H2,1-3H3/t7-/m0/s1 Key: VLJXXKKOSFGPHI-ZETCQYMHSA-N
- SMILES: CCCC(C)CC; (R): CCC[C@H](C)CC; (S): CCC[C@@H](C)CC

Properties
Chemical formula	C_{7}H_{16}
Molar mass	100.205 g·mol^{−1}
Appearance	Colorless liquid
Odor	Odorless
Density	686 mg mL^{−1}
Melting point	−119.40 °C; −182.92 °F; 153.75 K
Boiling point	91.6 to 92.2 °C; 196.8 to 197.9 °F; 364.7 to 365.3 K
log P	4.118
Vapor pressure	14.7 kPa (at 37.7 °C)
Henry's law constant (k_{H})	3.2 nmol Pa^{−1} kg^{−1}
Refractive index (n_{D})	1.388–1.389

Thermochemistry
Heat capacity (C)	216.7 J K^{−1} mol^{−1} (at −9.0 °C)
Std molar entropy (S^{⦵}_{298})	309.6 J K^{−1} mol^{−1}
Std enthalpy of formation (Δ_{f}H^{⦵}_{298})	−228.7–−226.1 kJ mol^{−1}
Std enthalpy of combustion (Δ_{c}H^{⦵}_{298})	−4.8151–−4.8127 MJ mol^{−1}

Hazards
- GHS labelling
Pictograms	(GHS02: Flammable) (GHS07: Exclamation mark) (GHS08: Health hazard) (GHS09: Environmental hazard)
Signal word	Danger
Hazard statements	H225, H304, H315, H336, H411
Precautionary statements	P210, P233, P240, P241, P242, P243, P261, P264, P271, P273, P280, P301+P310, P302+P352, P303+P361+P353, P304+P340, P312, P321, P331, P332+P313, P362, P370+P378, P391, P403+P233, P403+P235, P405, P501
Flash point	−1.0 °C (30.2 °F; 272.1 K)
Autoignition temperature	280 °C (536 °F; 553 K)
Explosive limits	1–7%

Related compounds
Related alkanes	2-Methylpentane; 3-Methylpentane; 3-Ethylpentane; 2-Methylhexane; 2-Methylheptane; 3-Methylheptane
Related compounds	2-Ethyl-1-butanol; Valnoctamide; 2-Ethylhexanol; Valpromide; 2-Ethylhexanoic acid
- Except where otherwise noted, data are given for materials in their standard state (at 25 °C [77 °F], 100 kPa). verify (what is ?) Infobox references

3-Methylhexane is a branched hydrocarbon with two enantiomers. It is one of the isomers of heptane.

The molecule is chiral, and is one of the two isomers of heptane to have this property, the other being its structural isomer 2,3-dimethylpentane. The enantiomers are (R)-3-methylhexane and (S)-3-methylhexane.
