= C6H10O =

The molecular formula C_{6}H_{10}O may refer to:

- Cyclohexanone
- Cyclohexene oxide
- cis-3-Hexenal
- Mesityl oxide
- 3-Methyl-3-penten-2-one
- Methylpentynol
- Methylene tetrahydropyran
- 1-Hexen-3-one
