= 3-Ethylpentane =

- Skeletal formula of 3-ethylpentane

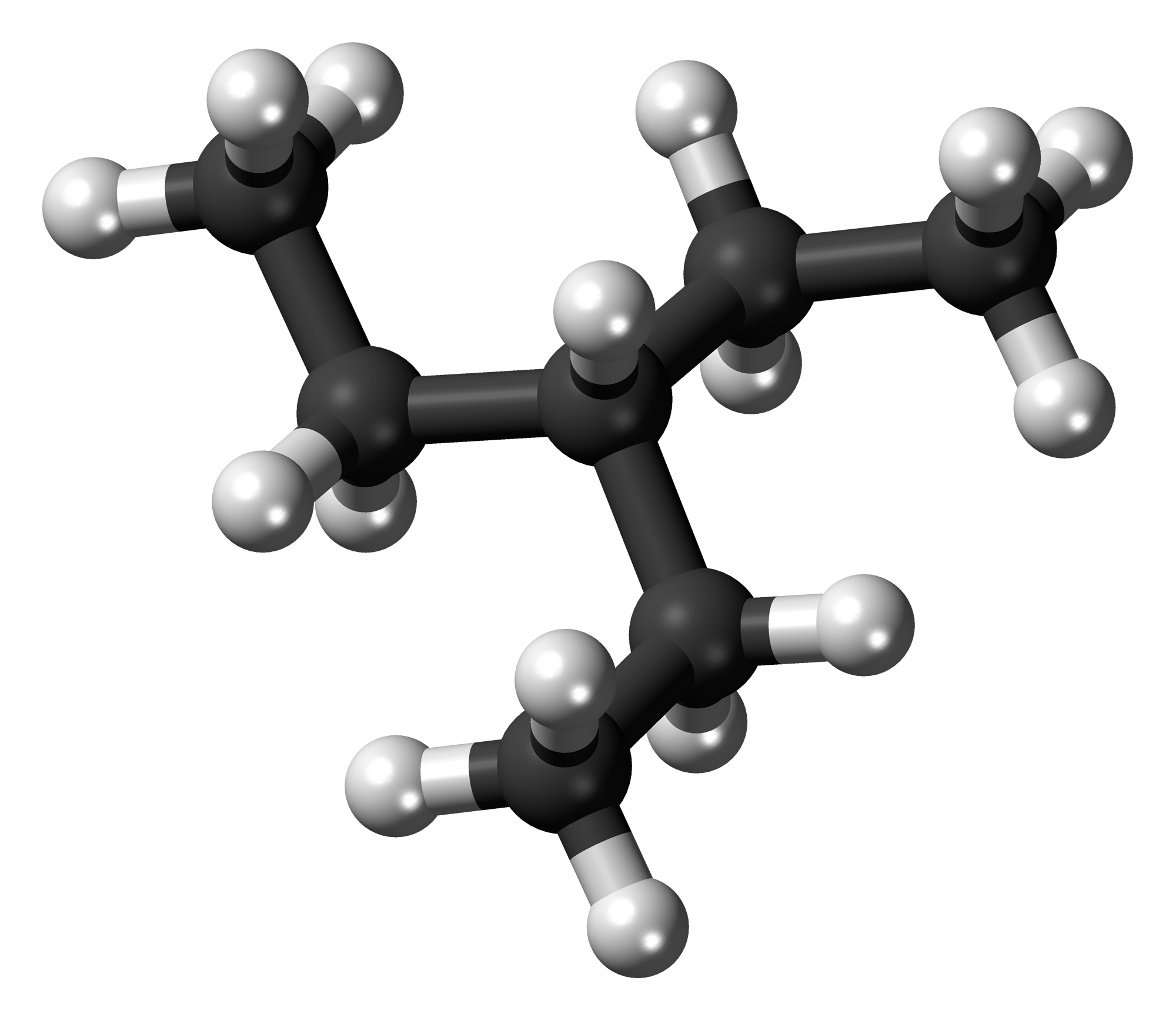
Ball and stick model of 3-ethylpentane
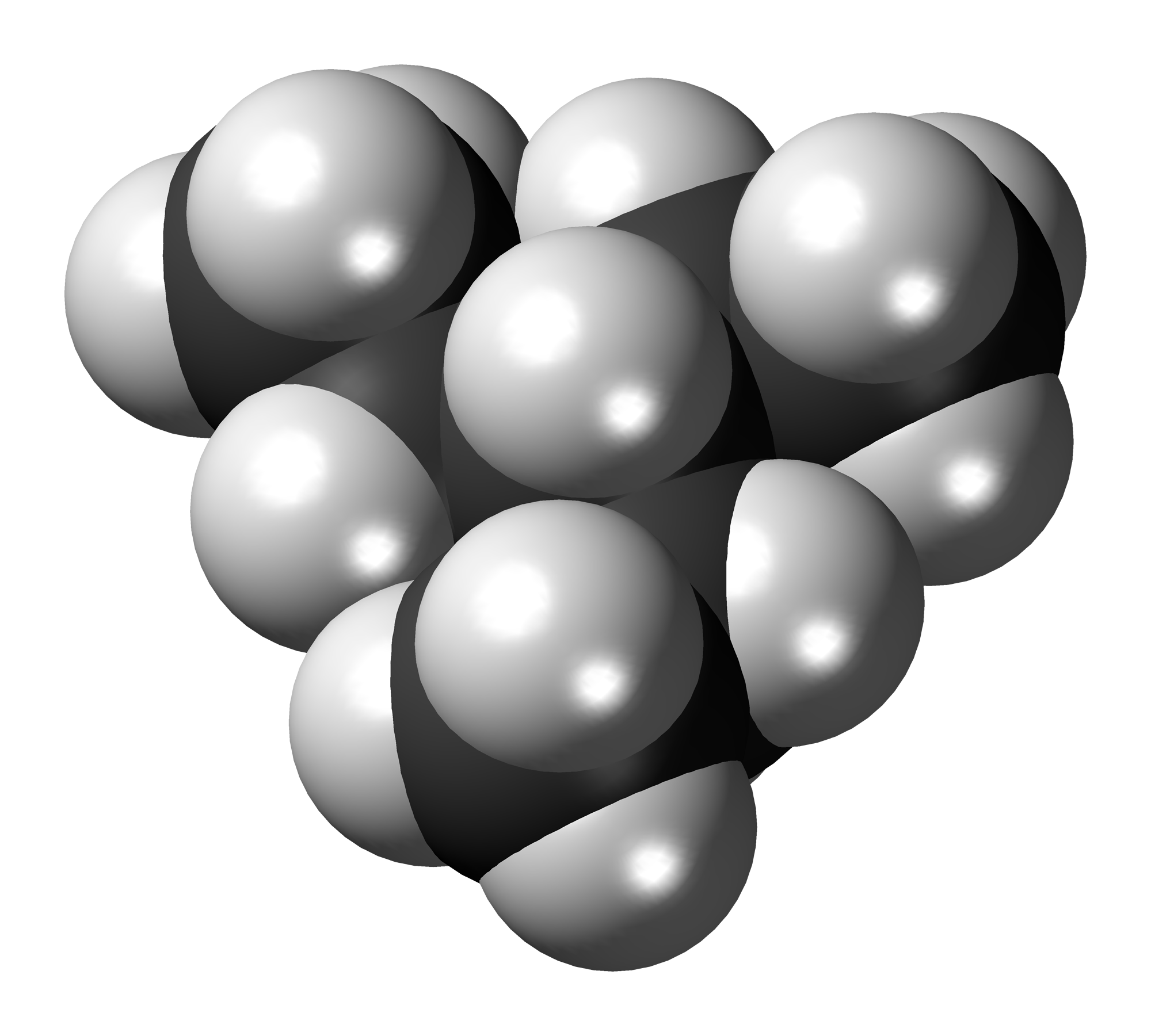
Spacefill model of 3-ethylpentane

Names
- Preferred IUPAC name 3-Ethylpentane

Identifiers
CAS Number	617-78-7
3D model (JSmol)	Interactive image
ChEBI	CHEBI:165737
ChemSpider	11551
ECHA InfoCard	100.009.573
EC Number	210-529-0
PubChem CID	12048
UNII	KN826QW56K
CompTox Dashboard (EPA)	DTXSID8073211
- InChI: InChI=1S/C7H16/c1-4-7(5-2)6-3/h7H,4-6H2,1-3H3 Key: AORMDLNPRGXHHL-UHFFFAOYSA-N
- SMILES: CCC(CC)CC

Properties
Chemical formula	C_{7}H_{16}
Molar mass	100.205 g·mol^{−1}
Appearance	Colourless liquid
Odor	Odourless
Density	693.77 mg mL^{−1}
Melting point	−119.0 to −118.5 °C; −182.1 to −181.4 °F; 154.2 to 154.6 K
Boiling point	93.3 to 93.7 °C; 199.8 to 200.6 °F; 366.4 to 366.8 K
Henry's law constant (k_{H})	3.9 nmol Pa^{−1} kg^{−1}

Thermochemistry
Heat capacity (C)	219.58 J K^{−1} mol^{−1}
Std molar entropy (S^{⦵}_{298})	314.55 J K^{−1} mol^{−1}
Std enthalpy of formation (Δ_{f}H^{⦵}_{298})	−226.2–−223.8 kJ mol^{−1}
Std enthalpy of combustion (Δ_{c}H^{⦵}_{298})	−4.8174–−4.8152 MJ mol^{−1}

Hazards
- GHS labelling
Pictograms	(GHS02: Flammable) (GHS08: Health hazard) (GHS07: Exclamation mark) (GHS09: Environmental hazard)
Signal word	Danger
Hazard statements	H225, H304, H315, H336, H410

Related compounds
Related alkanes	Isopentane; 2-Methylpentane; 3-Methylpentane; 2-Methylhexane; 3-Methylhexane
Related compounds	2-Ethyl-1-butanol; Valnoctamide
- Except where otherwise noted, data are given for materials in their standard state (at 25 °C [77 °F], 100 kPa). verify (what is ?) Infobox references

3-Ethylpentane (C_{7}H_{16}) is a branched saturated hydrocarbon. It is an alkane, and one of the many structural isomers of heptane, consisting of a five carbon chain with a two carbon branch at the middle carbon.

An example of an alcohol derived from 3-ethylpentane is the tertiary alcohol 3-ethylpentan-3-ol.
