= Pentane (data page) =

Chemical data page

This page provides supplementary chemical data on n-pentane.

== Material Safety Data Sheet ==
The handling of this chemical may incur notable safety precautions. It is highly recommend that you seek the Material Safety Datasheet (MSDS) for this chemical from a reliable source such as eChemPortal, and follow its directions.

- Mallinckrodt Baker.

== Structure and properties ==
Structure and properties
Index of refraction, n_{D}	1.3575 at 20 °C
Abbe number	?
Dielectric constant, ε_{r}	1.844 ε_{0} at 20 °C
Bond strength	?
Bond length	?
Bond angle	?
Magnetic susceptibility	?
Surface tension	18.16 dyn/cm at 0 °C; 17.03 dyn/cm at 10 °C; 15.82 dyn/cm at 20 °C; 14.73 dyn/cm at 30 °C; 13.66 dyn/cm at 40 °C
Viscosity	0.2894 mPa·s at 0 °C; 0.2395 mPa·s at 20 °C; 0.2200 mPa·s at 30 °C

== Thermodynamic properties ==
Phase behavior
Triple point	143.46 K (–128.69 °C), 0.076 Pa
Critical point	469.8 K (196.7 °C), 3360 kPa
Std enthalpy change of fusion, Δ_{fus}H^{~~o~~}	8.4 kJ/mol
Std entropy change of fusion, Δ_{fus}S^{~~o~~}	58.5 J/(mol·K)
Std enthalpy change of vaporization, Δ_{vap}H^{~~o~~}	26.200 kJ/mol at 25 °C; 25.79 kJ/mol at 36.1 °C
Std entropy change of vaporization, Δ_{vap}S^{~~o~~}	87.88 J/(mol·K) at 25 °C
Solid properties
Std enthalpy change of formation, Δ_{f}H^{~~o~~}_{solid}	? kJ/mol
Standard molar entropy, S^{~~o~~}_{solid}	? J/(mol K)
Heat capacity, c_{p}	? J/(mol K)
Liquid properties
Std enthalpy change of formation, Δ_{f}H^{~~o~~}_{liquid}	–173.5 kJ/mol
Standard molar entropy, S^{~~o~~}_{liquid}	263.47 J/(mol K)
Enthalpy of combustion, Δ_{c}H^{~~o~~}_{liquid}	–3509 kJ/mol
Heat capacity, c_{p}	167.19 J/(mol K) at 25 °C
Gas properties
Std enthalpy change of formation, Δ_{f}H^{~~o~~}_{gas}	–146.8 kJ/mol
Standard molar entropy, S^{~~o~~}_{gas}	347.82 J/(mol K)
Enthalpy of combustion, Δ_{c}H^{~~o~~}_{gas}	–3535 kJ/mol
Heat capacity, c_{p}	120.07 J/(mol K) at 25 °C

== Vapor pressure of liquid ==
P in mm Hg	1	10	40	100	400	760	1520	3800	7600	15200	30400	45600
T in °C	–76.6	–50.1	–29.2	–12.6	18.5	36.1	58.0	92.4	124.7	164.3	—	—

Table data obtained from CRC Handbook of Chemistry and Physics 47th ed.

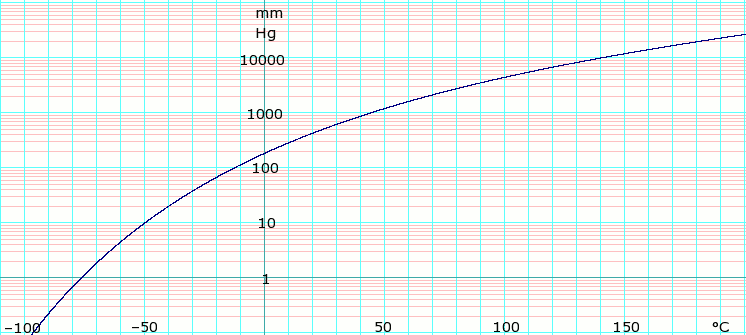
log_{10} of n-Pentane vapor pressure. Uses formula: $\scriptstyle \log_e P_{mmHg} =$$\scriptstyle \log_e (\frac {760} {101.325}) - 10.41840\log_e(T+273.15) - \frac {5778.024} {T+273.15} + 81.92460 + 1.178208 \times 10^{-5} (T+273.15)^2$ obtained from CHERIC

== Spectral data ==
UV-Vis
λ_{max}	? nm
Extinction coefficient, ε	?
IR
Major absorption bands	2881, 2940, 2965 cm^{−1}
NMR
Proton NMR
Carbon-13 NMR
Other NMR data
MS
Masses of main fragments

This box:
- Except where noted otherwise, data relate to Standard temperature and pressure.
- Reliability of data general note.
