= 2-Ethyl-1-butanol =

- Structural formula of 2-Ethyl-1-butanol

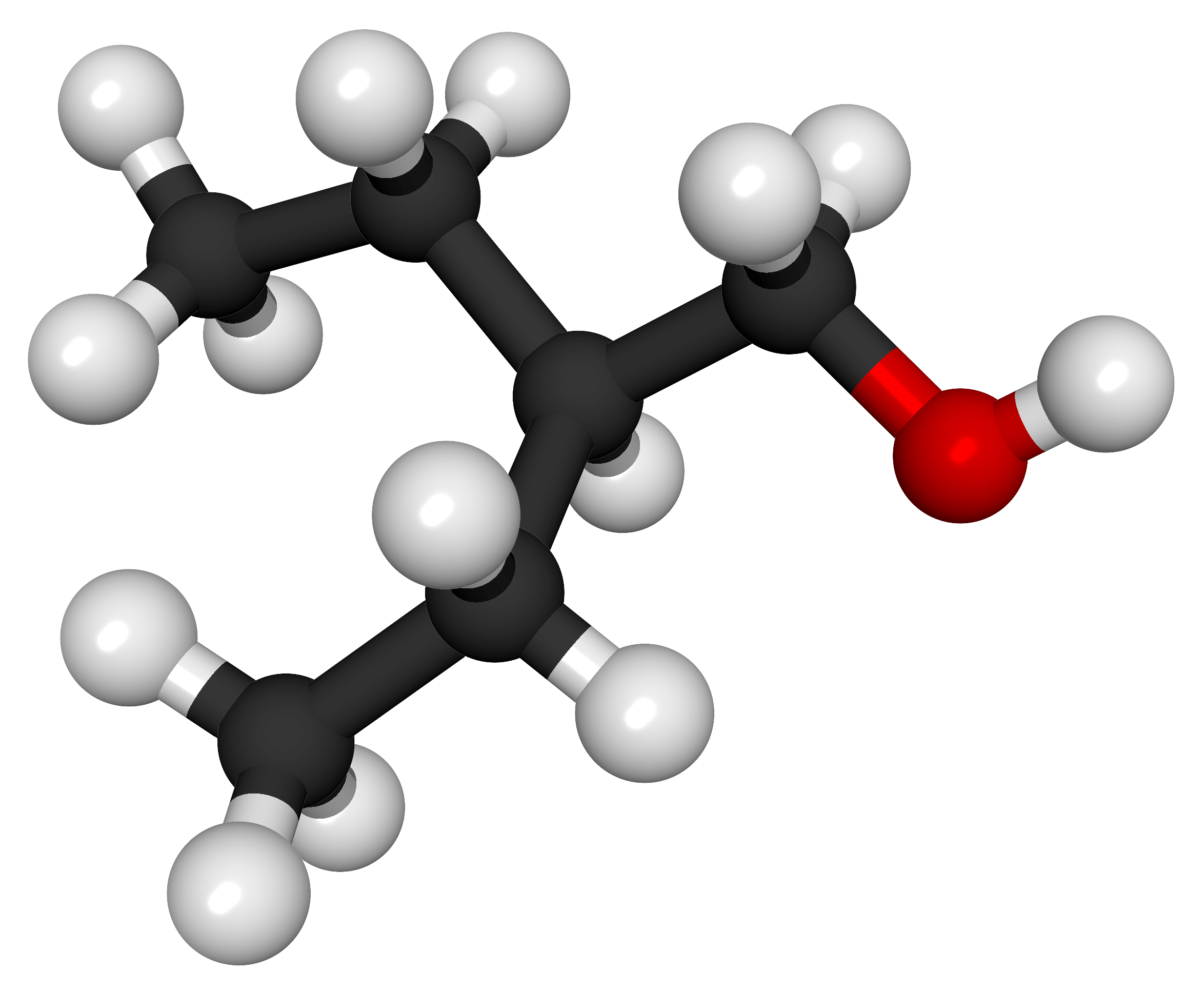
- 3D ball-and-stick structure of 2-ethyl-1-butanol

Names
- Preferred IUPAC name 2-Ethylbutan-1-ol
- Other names 2-Ethyl-1-butanol

Identifiers
CAS Number	97-95-0
3D model (JSmol)	Interactive image
Beilstein Reference	1731254
ChemSpider	7080
ECHA InfoCard	100.002.384
EC Number	202-621-4
PubChem CID	7358
RTECS number	EL3850000
UNII	28002VFS3H
UN number	2275
CompTox Dashboard (EPA)	DTXSID2041416
- InChI: InChI=1S/C6H14O/c1-3-6(4-2)5-7/h6-7H,3-5H2,1-2H3 Key: TZYRSLHNPKPEFV-UHFFFAOYSA-N
- SMILES: CCC(CC)CO

Properties
Chemical formula	C_{6}H_{14}O
Molar mass	102.177 g·mol^{−1}
Appearance	Colorless liquid
Density	830 mg mL^{−1}
Melting point	−114.40 °C; −173.92 °F; 158.75 K
Boiling point	145 to 151 °C; 293 to 304 °F; 418 to 424 K
Solubility in water	10 g L^{−1}
Vapor pressure	206 Pa
Refractive index (n_{D})	1.422

Thermochemistry
Heat capacity (C)	246.65 J K^{−1} mol^{−1}

Hazards
- GHS labelling
Pictograms	(GHS07: Exclamation mark)
Signal word	Warning
Hazard statements	H302, H312
Precautionary statements	P280
Flash point	58 °C (136 °F; 331 K)
- Lethal dose or concentration (LD, LC)
LD_{50} (median dose)	1.85 g kg^{−1} (oral, rat)

Related compounds
Related compounds	Isopentane; 2-Methylpentane; 3-Methylpentane; 3-Ethylpentane; 2-Methylhexane; 3-Methylhexane; Valnoctamide
- Except where otherwise noted, data are given for materials in their standard state (at 25 °C [77 °F], 100 kPa). verify (what is ?) Infobox references

2-Ethyl-1-butanol (IUPAC name: 2-ethylbutan-1-ol) is an organic chemical compound. It can be used to facilitate the separation of ethanol from water, which forms an azeotrope that otherwise limits the maximum ethanol concentration.

== Reactions ==
2-Ethyl-1-butanol is manufactured industrially by the aldol condensation of acetaldehyde and butyraldehyde, followed by hydrogenation. It may also be prepared by the Guerbet reaction.

== Properties and applications ==
The branching in 2-ethyl-1-butanol makes it harder to crystallize due to packing disruption, which results in a very low freezing point. Esters of 2-ethyl-1-butanol are similarly effected and it therefore finds application as a feedstock in the production of plasticizers and lubricants, where its presence helps reduce viscosity and lower freezing points.

== See also ==
- 2-Ethylhexanol
