= Isopentane =

Chemical compound (C5H12)

- Skeletal formula of isopentane

- Skeletal formula of isopentane with all implicit carbons shown, and all explicit hydrogens added

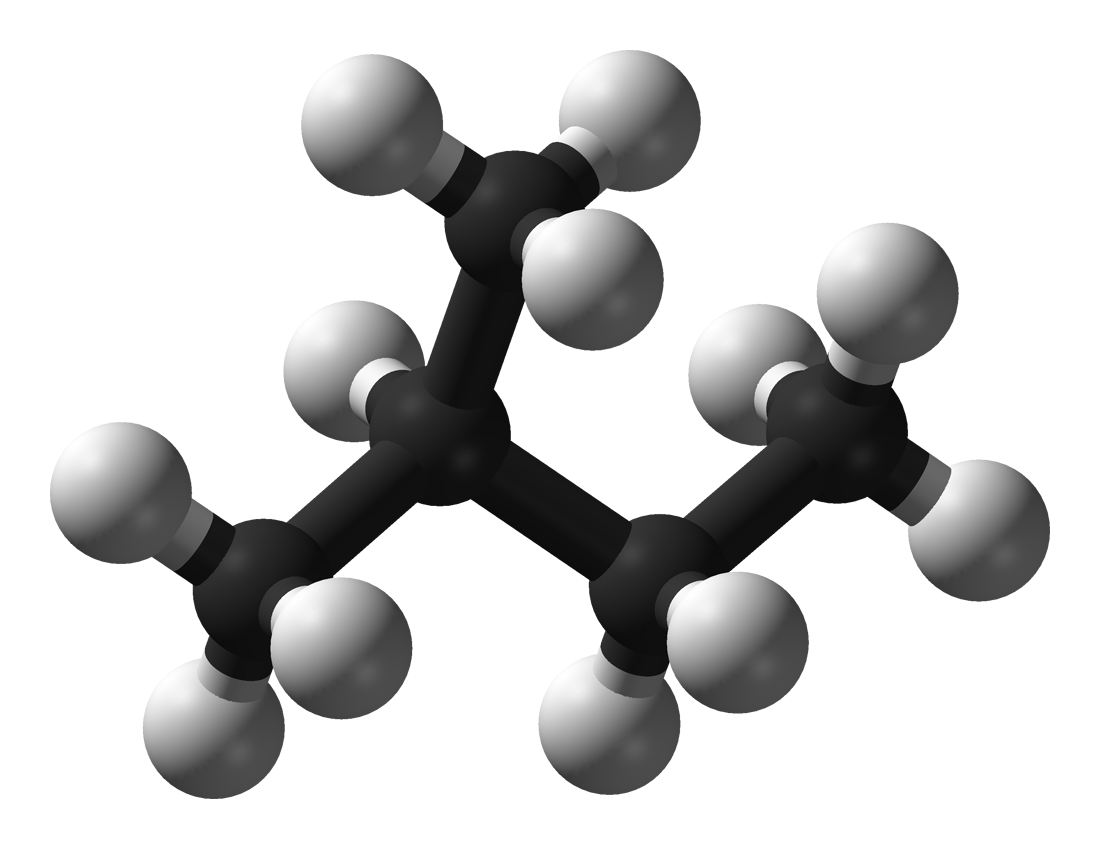
- Ball and stick model of isopentane

Names
- Preferred IUPAC name 2-Methylbutane
- Other names Isopentane

Identifiers
| CAS Number | 78-78-4 |
| 3D model (JSmol) | Interactive image |
| Beilstein Reference | 1730723 |
| ChEBI | CHEBI:30362 |
| ChemSpider | 6308 |
| ECHA InfoCard | 100.001.039 |
| EC Number | 201-142-8 |
| Gmelin Reference | 49318 |
| MeSH | isopentane |
| PubChem CID | 6556 |
| RTECS number | EK4430000 |
| UNII | ZH67814I0O |
| UN number | 1265 |
| CompTox Dashboard (EPA) | DTXSID901335409, DTXSID201032357 DTXSID8025468, DTXSID901335409, DTXSID201032357 |
- InChI: InChI=1S/C5H12/c1-4-5(2)3/h5H,4H2,1-3H3 Key: QWTDNUCVQCZILF-UHFFFAOYSA-N
- SMILES: CCC(C)C

Properties
| Chemical formula | C_{5}H_{12} |
| Molar mass | 72.151 g·mol^{−1} |
| Appearance | Colorless liquid |
| Odor | Gasoline-like |
| Density | 616 mg mL^{−1} |
| Melting point | −161 to −159 °C; −258 to −254 °F; 112 to 114 K |
| Boiling point | 27.8 to 28.2 °C; 81.9 to 82.7 °F; 300.9 to 301.3 K |
| Vapor pressure | 76.992 kPa (at 20 °C) |
| Henry's law constant (k_{H}) | 7.2 nmol Pa^{−1} kg^{−1} |
| UV-vis (λ_{max}) | 192 nm |
| Refractive index (n_{D}) | 1.354 |
| Viscosity | 0.214 cP (at 20 °C) |

Thermochemistry
| Heat capacity (C) | 164.85 J K^{−1} mol^{−1} |
| Std molar entropy (S^{⦵}_{298}) | 260.41 J K^{−1} mol^{−1} |
| Std enthalpy of formation (Δ_{f}H^{⦵}_{298}) | −179.1–−177.3 kJ mol^{−1} |
| Std enthalpy of combustion (Δ_{c}H^{⦵}_{298}) | ~ 3.3 MJ mol^{−1}, 19,664 Btu/lb |

Hazards
- GHS labelling
| Pictograms | (GHS02: Flammable) (GHS07: Exclamation mark) (GHS08: Health hazard) (GHS09: Environmental hazard) |
| Signal word | Danger |
| Hazard statements | H224, H301, H302, H305, H336, H411 |
| Precautionary statements | P210, P261, P273, P301+P310, P331 |
| NFPA 704 (fire diamond) | 1 4 0 |
| Flash point | −51 °C (−60 °F; 222 K) |
| Autoignition temperature | 420 °C (788 °F; 693 K) |
| Explosive limits | 1.4–8.3% |

Related compounds
| Related alkanes | Isobutane; 2-Methylpentane; 3-Methylpentane; 3-Ethylpentane |
| Related compounds | 2-Ethyl-1-butanol |
- Except where otherwise noted, data are given for materials in their standard state (at 25 °C [77 °F], 100 kPa). verify (what is ?) Infobox references

Isopentane, also called methylbutane or 2-methylbutane, is a branched-chain saturated hydrocarbon (an alkane) with five carbon atoms, with formula C_{5}H_{12} or CH(CH_{3})_{2}(C_{2}H_{5}).

Isopentane is a volatile and flammable liquid. It is one of three structural isomers with the molecular formula C_{5}H_{12}, the others being pentane (n-pentane) and neopentane (2,2-dimethylpropane).

Isopentane is commonly used in conjunction with liquid nitrogen to achieve a liquid bath temperature of −160 °C. Natural gas typically contains 1% or less isopentane, but it is a significant component of natural gasoline.

== History ==
Although the mixture of pentanes was first isolated from the destructive distillation (pyrolysis) products of the boghead coal by Charles Greville Williams in 1862. In 1864–1865 two chemists tried to extract same hydrocarbons from the Pennsylvanian oil. Carl Schorlemmer noted "that a mere trace of the liquid boiled below 30°C", but the first to properly separate isomers (and thus discover isopentane) was American chemist Cyrus Warren (1824–1891) slightly later, who measured the boiling point of the more volatile one at 30°C.

== Nomenclature ==
The traditional name isopentane, attested in English as early as 1875, was still retained in the 1993 IUPAC recommendations, but is no longer recommended according to the 2013 recommendations. The preferred IUPAC name is the systematic name 2-methylbutane. An isopentyl group is a subset of the generic pentyl group. It has the chemical structure -CH_{3}CH_{2}CH(CH_{3})_{2}.

== Uses ==
Isopentane is used in a closed loop in geothermal power production to drive turbines.

Isopentane is used, in conjunction with dry ice or liquid nitrogen, to freeze tissues for cryosectioning in histology.

Isopentane is a major component (sometimes 30% or more) of natural gasoline, an analog of common petroleum-derived gasoline that is condensed from natural gas. Its share in commercial car fuel is highly variable: 19–45% in 1990s Sweden, 4–31% in 1990s US and 3.6–11% in the US in 2011. It has a substantially higher octane rating (RON 93.7) than n-pentane (61.7), and therefore there is interest in conversion from the latter.
