= Hexane (data page) =

Chemical data page

This page provides supplementary chemical data on n-hexane.

== Material Safety Data Sheet ==
The handling of this chemical may incur notable safety precautions. It is highly recommend that you seek the Material Safety Datasheet (MSDS) for this chemical from a reliable source and follow its directions.

- eChemPortal
- Science Stuff
- Fisher Scientific.

== Structure and properties ==
Structure and properties
Index of refraction, n_{D}	1.3727 at 20 °C
Abbe number	?
Dielectric constant, ε_{r}	1.890 ε_{0} at 20 °C
Bond strength	?
Bond length
Bond angle	?
Magnetic susceptibility	?
Surface tension	20.5 dyn/cm at 0 °C; 18.4 dyn/cm at 20 °C; 13.4 dyn/cm at 68 °C
Viscosity	0.4012 mPa·s at 0 °C; 0.3258 mPa·s at 20 °C; 0.2798 mPa·s at 40 °C; 0.2288 mPa·s at 80 °C

== Thermodynamic properties ==
Phase behavior
Triple point	178.0 K (–95.1 °C), 1.23 Pa
Critical point	507.6 K (234.5 °C), 3020 kPa
Std enthalpy change of fusion, Δ_{fus}H^{~~o~~}	13 kJ/mol
Std entropy change of fusion, Δ_{fus}S^{~~o~~}	70 J/(mol·K)
Std enthalpy change of vaporization, Δ_{vap}H^{~~o~~}	28.85 kJ/mol at 68.8 °C
Std entropy change of vaporization, Δ_{vap}S^{~~o~~}	? J/(mol·K)
Solid properties
Std enthalpy change of formation, Δ_{f}H^{~~o~~}_{solid}	? kJ/mol
Standard molar entropy, S^{~~o~~}_{solid}	? J/(mol K)
Heat capacity, c_{p}	? J/(mol K)
Liquid properties
Std enthalpy change of formation, Δ_{f}H^{~~o~~}_{liquid}	–198.7 kJ/mol
Standard molar entropy, S^{~~o~~}_{liquid}	295 J/(mol K)
Enthalpy of combustion, Δ_{c}H^{~~o~~}	–4163 kJ/mol
Heat capacity, c_{p}	197.66 J/(mol K)
Gas properties
Std enthalpy change of formation, Δ_{f}H^{~~o~~}_{gas}	–167.2 kJ/mol
Standard molar entropy, S^{~~o~~}_{gas}	388.82 J/(mol K)
Heat capacity, c_{p}	142.6 J/(mol K) at 25 °C
van der Waals' constants	a = 2471 L^{2} kPa/mol^{2} b = 0.1735 liter per mole

== Vapor pressure of liquid ==
P in mm Hg	1	10	40	100	400	760	1520	3800	7600	15200	30400	45600
T in °C	–53.9	–25.0	–2.3	15.8	49.6	68.7	93.0	131.7	166.6	209.4	—	—

Table data obtained from CRC Handbook of Chemistry and Physics 44th ed.

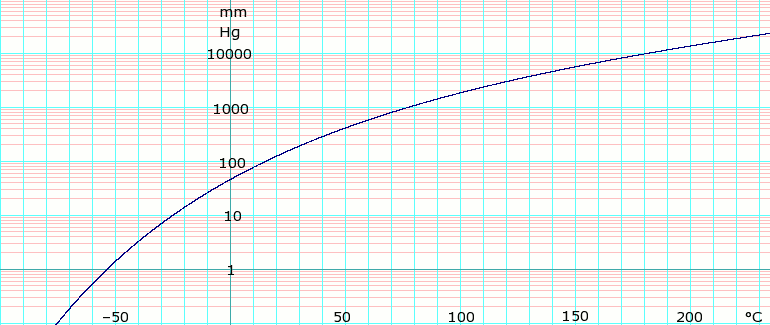
log_{10} of Hexane vapor pressure. Uses formula: $\scriptstyle \log_e P_{mmHg} =$$\scriptstyle \log_e (\frac {760} {101.325}) - 13.99935 \log_e(T+273.15) - \frac {7284.572} {T+273.15} + 105.9605 + 1.410325 \times 10^{-5} (T+273.15)^2$ obtained from CHERIC

== Distillation data ==
Vapor-Liquid Equilibrium of n-Hexane/Ethanol; P = 760 mm Hg
BP Temp. °C	% by mole ethanol
BP Temp. °C	liquid	vapor
76.0	99.0	90.5
73.2	98.0	80.7
67.4	94.0	63.5
65.9	92.0	58.0
61.8	84.8	46.8
59.4	75.5	39.5
58.7	66.7	37.0
58.35	54.8	36.0
58.1	41.2	35.0
58.0	33.0	34.0
58.25	27.5	33.0
58.45	23.5	32.5
59.15	10.2	29.0
60.2	4.5	25.5
63.5	1.0	16.0
66.7	0.6	6.5

Vapor-Liquid Equilibrium of n-Hexane/Methanol; P = 760 mm Hg
BP Temp. °C	% by mole methanol
BP Temp. °C	liquid	vapor
56.9	1.0	30.0
51.3	2.2	41.8
51.2	4.0	43.9
50.5	9.5	47.7
49.9	17.5	49.1
50.0	28.3	49.6
49.9	40.5	49.7
49.0	52.5	50.2
49.9	70.4	50.0
49.9	72.4	50.0
50.2	84.6	51.6
50.1	85.4	51.6
50.2	87.5	51.5
51.4	90.6	55.0
51.2	90.6	55.1
51.7	92.2	56.0
51.6	92.3	56.0
52.8	94.9	61.2
53.8	95.7	63.5
54.7	96.5	66.4
55.8	96.5	69.5
55.6	96.8	69.4
58.2	97.7	76.8
57.9	97.8	75.5
63.0	99.3	93.5
63.5	99.55	95.0

Vapor-Liquid Equilibrium of n-Hexane/n-Heptane; P = 101.0 kPa
BP Temp. °C	% by mole hexane
BP Temp. °C	liquid	vapor
98.32	0.00	0.00
96.30	3.83	8.52
94.03	9.64	19.86
92.35	13.63	27.31
90.37	19.04	36.00
88.26	24.59	44.07
85.96	31.46	52.58
83.22	39.53	62.36
82.41	43.21	65.34
80.80	48.53	70.30
79.78	51.23	72.70
78.79	55.71	76.22
77.12	61.87	80.74
75.57	68.24	84.95
74.98	70.12	86.15
73.51	76.79	89.93
81.40	81.60	92.40
70.59	89.91	96.37
68.66	100.00	100.00

== Spectral data ==
UV-Vis
λ_{max}	? nm
Extinction coefficient, ε	?
IR
Major absorption bands	? cm^{−1}
NMR
Proton NMR	(CDCl_{3}, 400 MHz) δ 1.35-1.23 (m, 8H), 0.91-0.86 (m, 6H)
Carbon-13 NMR	(CDCl_{3}, 25 MHz) δ 31.9, 22.9, 12.2
Other NMR data
MS
Masses of main fragments

This box:
- Except where noted otherwise, data relate to Standard temperature and pressure.
- Reliability of data general note.
