= Bartec =

German safety technology company

- Company type: Private
- Founded: 1975; 51 years ago
- Headquarters: Bad Mergentheim, Baden-Württemberg, Germany
- Key people: Martin U. Schefter (Chief Executive Officer)Managing Director)
- Products: Safety systems and components for working in the presence of flammable substances
- Number of employees: 1000
- Website: bartec.com

Bartec (own spelling BARTEC) is a German safety technology company headquartered in Bad Mergentheim in the Main-Tauber district of Baden-Württemberg. Reinhold A. Barlian founded this company in 1975 as a one-man company and initially he started by creating a safety switch to prevent explosions at gas stations.

Bartec has been listed as the global market leaders in the Heilbronn - Franconia region and has also been awarded from the former Minister-President of Baden-Württemberg, Lothar Späth and various other awards too.

The company has its 11 production sites in Germany, Slovenia, Italy, Norway, Great Britain, Saudi Arabia, USA and China around 50 international sales partners around the globe. Bartec manufactures mainly the safety systems for working in the presence of flammable substances. Its products are like Moisture analyzer, Moisture measuring devices, Temperature measuring devices, Process measurement technology.
