= 3-Methyl-3-penten-2-one =

Names
- Preferred IUPAC name 3-Methylpent-3-en-2-one

Identifiers
CAS Number	565-62-8
3D model (JSmol)	Interactive image
ChEMBL	ChEMBL3184903
ChemSpider	4516728
ECHA InfoCard	100.008.440
EC Number	209-283-7
PubChem CID	5364579
UNII	70TS08S754
CompTox Dashboard (EPA)	DTXSID4041490
- InChI: InChI=1S/C6H10O/c1-4-5(2)6(3)7/h4H,1-3H3/b5-4+ Key: ZAMCMCQRTZKGDX-SNAWJCMRSA-N
- SMILES: C/C=C(\C)/C(=O)C

Properties
Chemical formula	C_{6}H_{10}O
Molar mass	98.145 g·mol^{−1}
Appearance	Clear liquid
Density	0.875 g/cm^{3} (at 20 °C)

Hazards
- GHS labelling
Pictograms	(GHS02: Flammable) (GHS06: Toxic) (GHS07: Exclamation mark)
Signal word	Danger
Hazard statements	H226, H302, H312, H315, H319, H331, H332, H335
Precautionary statements	P210, P233, P240, P241, P242, P243, P261, P264, P270, P271, P280, P301+P312, P302+P352, P303+P361+P353, P304+P312, P304+P340, P305+P351+P338, P311, P312, P321, P322, P330, P332+P313, P337+P313, P362, P363, P370+P378, P403+P233, P403+P235, P405, P501
Flash point	34 °C (93 °F) (closed cup)
- Except where otherwise noted, data are given for materials in their standard state (at 25 °C [77 °F], 100 kPa). Infobox references

3-Methyl-3-penten-2-one is an unsaturated aliphatic ketone. It is an isomer of mesityl oxide and isomesityl oxide. It is a precursor of 3-methyl-2-pentanone (methyl sec-butyl ketone) and is obtained by acid-catalyzed dehydration of 4-hydroxy-3-methyl-2-pentanone. It is used as an intermediate in organic chemistry syntheses.
