= 3-Methyl-2-pentanone =

Names
- Preferred IUPAC name 3-Methylpentan-2-one
- Other names Methyl sec-Butyl ketone

Identifiers
CAS Number	565-61-7
3D model (JSmol)	Interactive image
ChEMBL	ChEMBL3182903
ChemSpider	10788
ECHA InfoCard	100.008.439
EC Number	209-282-1
PubChem CID	11262
UNII	S6QAE3S2Z8
CompTox Dashboard (EPA)	DTXSID4021634
- InChI: InChI=1S/C6H12O/c1-4-5(2)6(3)7/h5H,4H2,1-3H3 Key: UIHCLUNTQKBZGK-UHFFFAOYSA-N; InChI=1/C6H12O/c1-4-5(2)6(3)7/h5H,4H2,1-3H3 Key: UIHCLUNTQKBZGK-UHFFFAOYAL
- SMILES: CCC(C)C(=O)C

Properties
Chemical formula	C_{6}H_{12}O
Molar mass	100.161 g·mol^{−1}
Appearance	Colorless liquid
Odor	Peppermint-like
Density	0.8130 g/mL (20 °C)
Melting point	−83 °C (−117 °F; 190 K)
Boiling point	116 °C (241 °F; 389 K)
Solubility in water	2.26 wt % (20 °C)
Refractive index (n_{D})	1.4012 (20 °C)

Hazards
- GHS labelling
Pictograms	(GHS02: Flammable)
Signal word	Danger
Hazard statements	H225
Precautionary statements	P210, P233, P240, P241, P242, P243, P280, P303+P361+P353, P370+P378, P403+P235, P501
Flash point	12 °C (54 °F; 285 K)
- Except where otherwise noted, data are given for materials in their standard state (at 25 °C [77 °F], 100 kPa). Infobox references

3-Methyl-2-pentanone (methyl sec-butyl ketone) is an aliphatic ketone and isomer of 2-hexanone.
