= 3-Methylpentane =

- Skeletal formula of 3-methylpentane

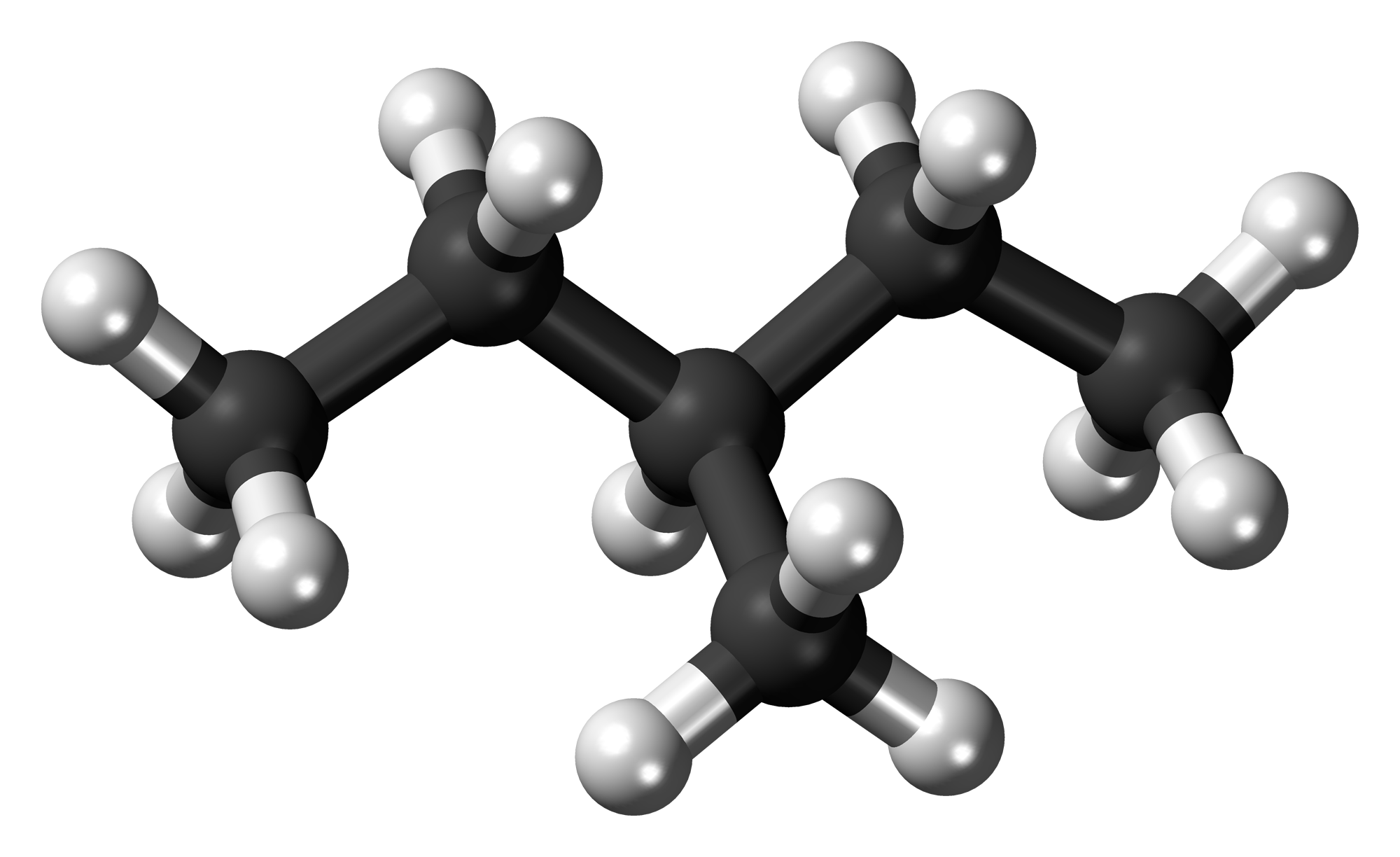
Ball and stick model of 3-methylpentane
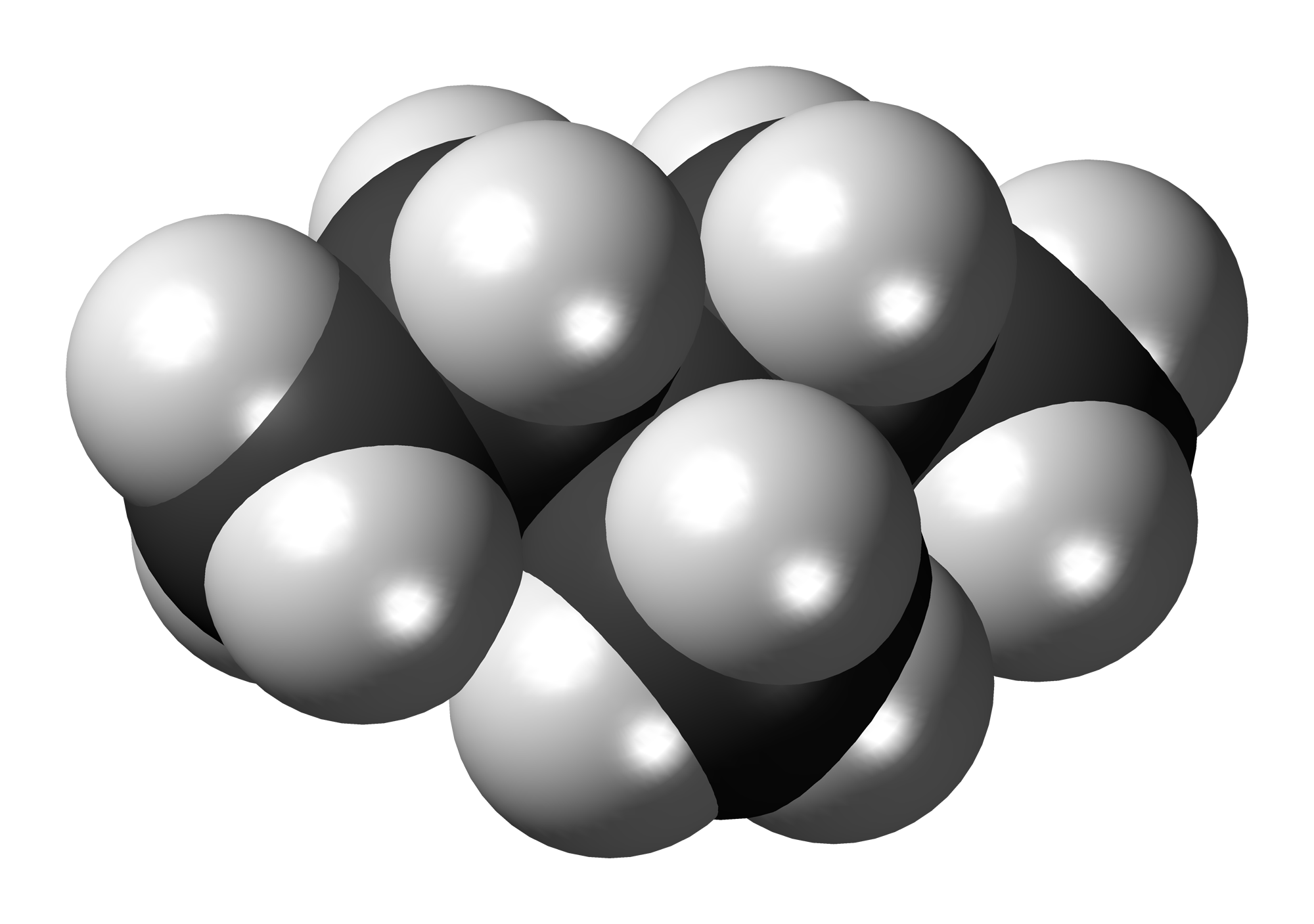
Spacefill model of 3-methylpentane

Names
- Preferred IUPAC name 3-Methylpentane

Identifiers
CAS Number	96-14-0
3D model (JSmol)	Interactive image
Beilstein Reference	1730734
ChEBI	CHEBI:88373
ChEMBL	ChEMBL357767
ChemSpider	7010
ECHA InfoCard	100.002.257
EC Number	202-481-4
MeSH	3-methylpentane
PubChem CID	7282
RTECS number	SA2995500
UNII	XD8O3ML76T
UN number	1208
CompTox Dashboard (EPA)	DTXSID8052647
- InChI: InChI=1S/C6H14/c1-4-6(3)5-2/h6H,4-5H2,1-3H3 Key: PFEOZHBOMNWTJB-UHFFFAOYSA-N
- SMILES: CCC(C)CC

Properties
Chemical formula	C_{6}H_{14}
Molar mass	86.178 g·mol^{−1}
Appearance	Colorless liquid
Odor	Odorless
Density	664 mg mL^{−1}
Melting point	−162.8 °C; −261.1 °F; 110.3 K
Boiling point	62.9 to 63.7 °C; 145.1 to 146.6 °F; 336.0 to 336.8 K
Solubility in water	Insoluble
log P	3.608
Vapor pressure	18.0 kPa (at 17 °C)
Henry's law constant (k_{H})	8.8 mol Pa^{−1} kg^{−1}
Magnetic susceptibility (χ)	−75.52·10^{−6} cm^{3}/mol
Refractive index (n_{D})	1.376

Thermochemistry
Heat capacity (C)	191.16 J K^{−1} mol^{−1}
Std molar entropy (S^{⦵}_{298})	292.5 J K^{−1} mol^{−1}
Std enthalpy of formation (Δ_{f}H^{⦵}_{298})	−203.0 – −201.0 kJ mol^{−1}
Std enthalpy of combustion (Δ_{c}H^{⦵}_{298})	−4.1608 – −4.1590 MJ mol^{−1}

Hazards
- GHS labelling
Pictograms	(GHS02: Flammable) (GHS07: Exclamation mark) (GHS08: Health hazard) (GHS09: Environmental hazard)
Signal word	Danger
Hazard statements	H225, H304, H315, H336, H411
Precautionary statements	P210, P261, P273, P301+P310, P331
Flash point	−7 °C (19 °F; 266 K)
Autoignition temperature	278 °C (532 °F; 551 K)
Explosive limits	1.2–7.7%
- NIOSH (US health exposure limits)
PEL (Permissible)	none

Related compounds
Related alkanes	Isopentane; 2-Methylpentane; 3-Ethylpentane; 2-Methylhexane; 3-Methylhexane
Related compounds	2-Ethyl-1-butanol; Valnoctamide
- Except where otherwise noted, data are given for materials in their standard state (at 25 °C [77 °F], 100 kPa). verify (what is ?) Infobox references

3-Methylpentane is a branched alkane with the molecular formula C_{6}H_{14}. It is a structural isomer of hexane composed of a methyl group bonded to the third carbon atom in a pentane chain. It is of similar structure to the isomeric 2-methylpentane, which has the methyl group located on the second carbon of the pentane chain.

As of early 1990s, it was present in American and European gasoline in small amounts, and by 2011 its share in US gas varied between 1.5 and 6% It has close research and motor octane numbers of 74.5 and 74.3.
