= Valpromide =

- Skeletal formula of valpromide

Names
- Preferred IUPAC name 2-Propylpentanamide

Identifiers
| CAS Number | 2430-27-5 |
| 3D model (JSmol) | Interactive image |
| ChEBI | CHEBI:74562 |
| ChEMBL | ChEMBL93836 |
| ChemSpider | 64264 |
| DrugBank | DB04165 |
| ECHA InfoCard | 100.017.632 |
| EC Number | 219-394-2 |
| KEGG | D02766 |
| MeSH | dipropylacetamide |
| PubChem CID | 71113 |
| UNII | RUA6CWU76G |
| CompTox Dashboard (EPA) | DTXSID1023734 |
- InChI: InChI=1S/C8H17NO/c1-3-5-7(6-4-2)8(9)10/h7H,3-6H2,1-2H3,(H2,9,10) Key: OMOMUFTZPTXCHP-UHFFFAOYSA-N
- SMILES: CCCC(CCC)C(N)=O

Properties
| Chemical formula | C_{8}H_{17}NO |
| Molar mass | 143.230 g·mol^{−1} |
| Appearance | White crystals |
| Melting point | 125 °C (257 °F; 398 K) |
| log P | 2.041 |

Pharmacology
| ATC code | N03AG02 (WHO) |

Hazards
- GHS labelling
| Pictograms | (GHS07: Exclamation mark) |
| Signal word | Warning |
| Hazard statements | H302 |
- Lethal dose or concentration (LD, LC)
| LD_{50} (median dose) | 438 mg kg^{−1} (intraperitoneal, mouse); 890.0 mg kg^{−1} (oral, rat) |

Related compounds
| Related amides | Valnoctamide |
- Except where otherwise noted, data are given for materials in their standard state (at 25 °C [77 °F], 100 kPa). verify (what is ?) Infobox references

Valpromide (marketed as Depamide by Sanofi-Aventis) is a carboxamide derivative of valproic acid used in the treatment of epilepsy and some affective disorders. It is rapidly metabolised (80%) to valproic acid (another anticonvulsant) but has anticonvulsant properties itself. It may produce more stable plasma levels than valproic acid or sodium valproate and may be more effective at preventing febrile seizures. However, it is over one hundred times more potent as an inhibitor of liver microsomal epoxide hydrolase. This makes it incompatible with carbamazepine and can affect the ability of the body to remove other toxins. Valpromide is no safer during pregnancy than valproic acid.

Valpromide is formed through the reaction of valproic acid and ammonia via an intermediate acid chloride.

In pure form, valpromide is a white crystalline powder and has a melting point 125–126 °C. It is soluble only in hot water. It is available on the market in some European countries.

== See also ==
- Valproate pivoxil
- Valnoctamide
