= 2-Methylpentane =

Skeletal formula of 2-methylpentane
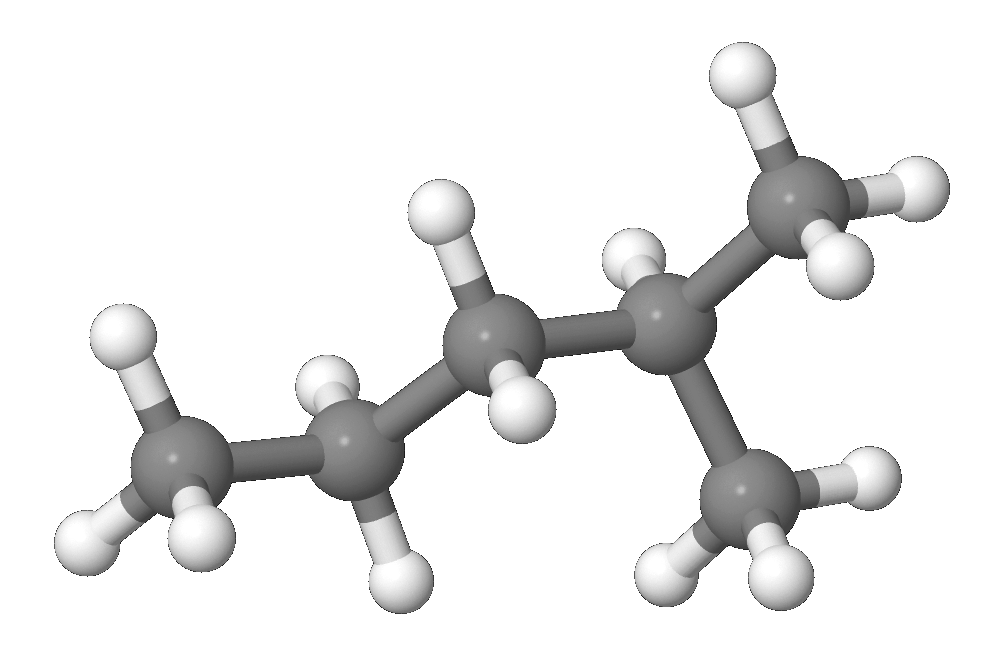
Ball-and-Stick model of 2-methylpentane

Names
- Preferred IUPAC name 2-Methylpentane
- Other names Isohexane

Identifiers
CAS Number	107-83-5
3D model (JSmol)	Interactive image
Beilstein Reference	1730735
ChEBI	CHEBI:88374
ChEMBL	ChEMBL30909
ChemSpider	7604
ECHA InfoCard	100.003.204
EC Number	203-523-4
MeSH	2-methylpentane
PubChem CID	7892
RTECS number	SA2985000
UNII	49IB0U6MLD
UN number	1208
CompTox Dashboard (EPA)	DTXSID4029143
- InChI: InChI=1S/C6H14/c1-4-5-6(2)3/h6H,4-5H2,1-3H3 Key: AFABGHUZZDYHJO-UHFFFAOYSA-N
- SMILES: CCCC(C)C

Properties
Chemical formula	C_{6}H_{14}
Molar mass	86.178 g·mol^{−1}
Appearance	Colorless liquid
Odor	Odorless
Density	653 mg mL^{−1}
Melting point	−160 to −146 °C; −256 to −231 °F; 113 to 127 K
Boiling point	60 to 62 °C; 140 to 143 °F; 333 to 335 K
log P	3.608
Vapor pressure	46.7 kPa (at 37.7 °C)
Henry's law constant (k_{H})	5.7 nmol Pa^{−1} kg^{−1}
Magnetic susceptibility (χ)	−75.26·10^{−6} cm^{3}/mol
Refractive index (n_{D})	1.371

Thermochemistry
Heat capacity (C)	194.19 J K^{−1} mol^{−1}
Std molar entropy (S^{⦵}_{298})	290.58 J K^{−1} mol^{−1}
Std enthalpy of formation (Δ_{f}H^{⦵}_{298})	−205.3 – −203.3 kJ mol^{−1}

Hazards
- GHS labelling
Pictograms	(GHS02: Flammable) (GHS07: Exclamation mark) (GHS08: Health hazard) (GHS09: Environmental hazard)
Signal word	Danger
Hazard statements	H225, H304, H315, H336, H411
Precautionary statements	P210, P261, P273, P301+P310, P331
NFPA 704 (fire diamond)	2 3 0
Flash point	−7 °C (19 °F; 266 K)
Autoignition temperature	306 °C (583 °F; 579 K)
Explosive limits	1.2–7%
- NIOSH (US health exposure limits)
PEL (Permissible)	none

Related compounds
Related alkanes	Isopentane; 3-Methylpentane; 3-Ethylpentane; 2-Methylhexane; 3-Methylhexane
Related compounds	2-Ethyl-1-butanol
- Except where otherwise noted, data are given for materials in their standard state (at 25 °C [77 °F], 100 kPa). verify (what is ?) Infobox references

2-Methylpentane, trivially known as isohexane, is a branched-chain alkane with the molecular formula C_{6}H_{14}. It is a structural isomer of hexane composed of a methyl group bonded to the second carbon atom in a pentane chain.

As of early 1990s, it was present in American and European gasoline in small amounts, and by 2011 its share in US gas varied between 2 and 8%. Using a quantitative structure-activity relationship (QSAR) prediction model, 2-Methylpentane has a research octane number (RON) of 75, motor octane number (MON) of 77, and cetane number (CN) of 29.

== See also ==
- Heteropoly acid
