= Pentane =

Alkane with 5 carbon atoms C5H12

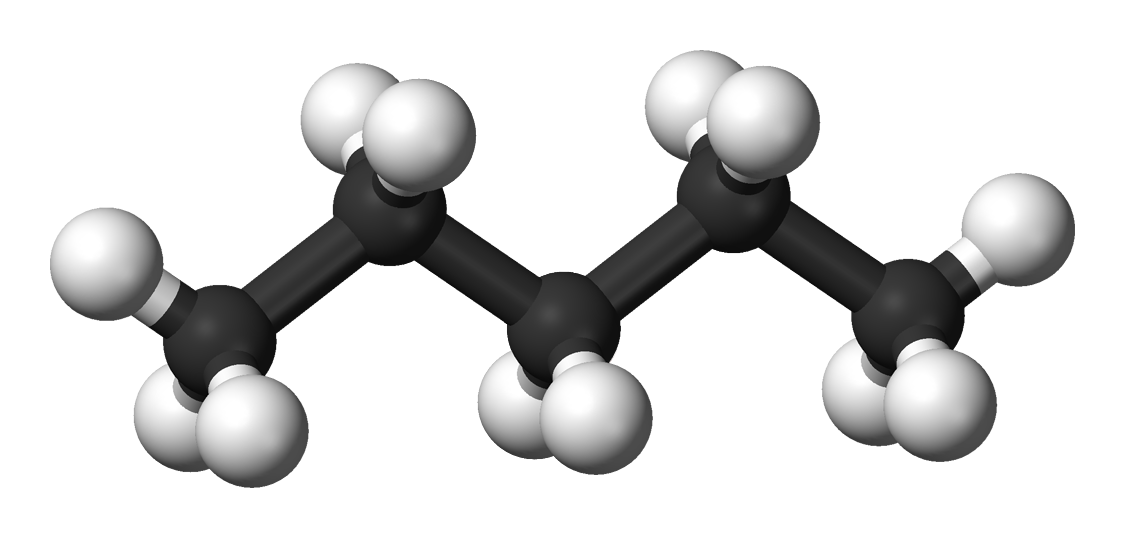

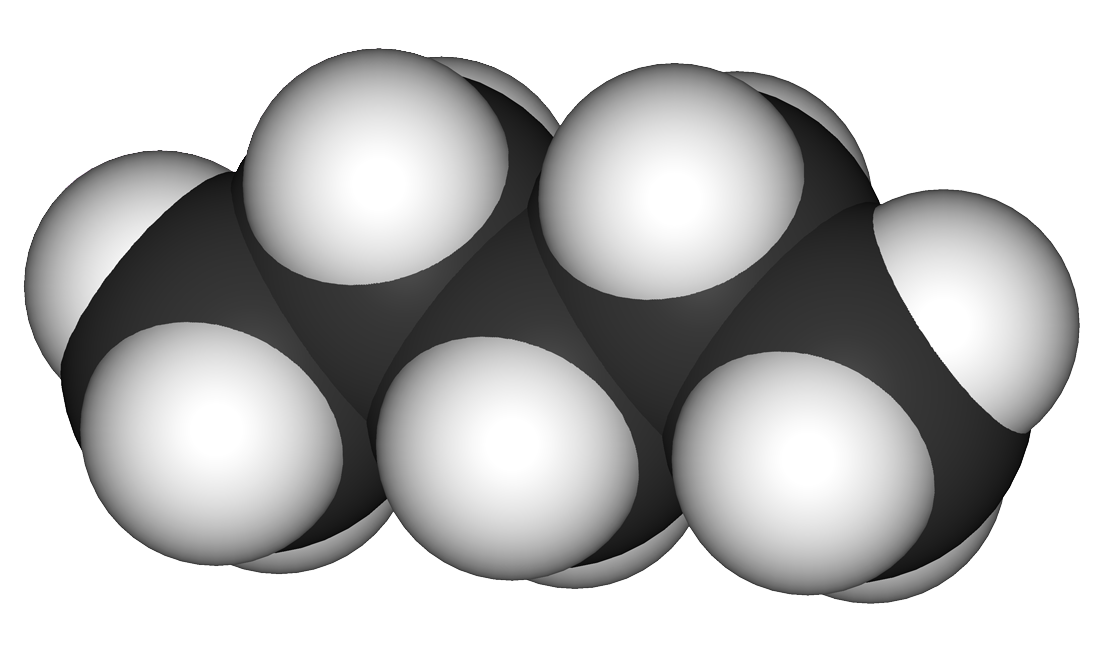

Names
- Preferred IUPAC name Pentane
- Other names Quintane; Refrigerant-4-13-0; Pentyl hydride Amyl hydride

Identifiers
CAS Number	109-66-0
3D model (JSmol)	Interactive image
Beilstein Reference	969132
ChEBI	CHEBI:37830
ChEMBL	ChEMBL16102
ChemSpider	7712
DrugBank	DB03119
ECHA InfoCard	100.003.358
EC Number	203-692-4
Gmelin Reference	1766
MeSH	pentane
PubChem CID	8003
RTECS number	RZ9450000
UNII	4FEX897A91
UN number	1265
CompTox Dashboard (EPA)	DTXSID2025846
- InChI: InChI=1S/C5H12/c1-3-5-4-2/h3-5H2,1-2H3 Key: OFBQJSOFQDEBGM-UHFFFAOYSA-N
- SMILES: CCCCC

Properties
Chemical formula	C_{5}H_{12}
Molar mass	72.151 g·mol^{−1}
Appearance	Colourless liquid
Odor	Gasoline-like
Density	0.626 g/mL; 0.6262 g/mL (20 °C)
Melting point	−130.5 to −129.1 °C; −202.8 to −200.3 °F; 142.7 to 144.1 K
Boiling point	35.9 to 36.3 °C; 96.5 to 97.3 °F; 309.0 to 309.4 K
Solubility in water	40 mg/L (20 °C)
log P	3.255
Vapor pressure	57.90 kPa (20.0 °C)
Henry's law constant (k_{H})	7.8 nmol Pa^{−1} kg^{−1}
Acidity (pK_{a})	~45
Basicity (pK_{b})	~59
UV-vis (λ_{max})	200 nm
Magnetic susceptibility (χ)	−63.05·10^{−6} cm^{3}/mol
Refractive index (n_{D})	1.358
Viscosity	0.240 mPa·s (at 20 °C)

Thermochemistry
Heat capacity (C)	167.19 J K^{−1} mol^{−1}
Std molar entropy (S^{⦵}_{298})	263.47 J K^{−1} mol^{−1}
Std enthalpy of formation (Δ_{f}H^{⦵}_{298})	−174.1–−172.9 kJ mol^{−1}
Std enthalpy of combustion (Δ_{c}H^{⦵}_{298})	−3.5095–−3.5085 MJ mol^{−1}

Hazards
- GHS labelling
Pictograms	(GHS02: Flammable) (GHS07: Exclamation mark) (GHS08: Health hazard) (GHS09: Environmental hazard)
Signal word	Danger
Hazard statements	H225, H304, H336, H411
Precautionary statements	P210, P233, P240, P241, P242, P243, P261, P271, P273, P280, P301+P316, P303+P361+P353, P304+P340, P319, P331, P370+P378, P391, P403+P233, P403+P235, P405, P501
NFPA 704 (fire diamond)	1 4 0
Flash point	−49.0 °C (−56.2 °F; 224.2 K)
Autoignition temperature	260.0 °C (500.0 °F; 533.1 K)
Explosive limits	1.5–7.8%
- Lethal dose or concentration (LD, LC)
LD_{50} (median dose)	3 g kg^{−1} (dermal, rabbit); 5 g kg^{−1} (oral, mouse)
LC_{50} (median concentration)	130,000 mg/m^{3} (mouse, 30 min); 128,200 ppm (mouse, 37 min); 325,000 mg/m^{3} (mouse, 2 hr)
- NIOSH (US health exposure limits)
PEL (Permissible)	TWA 1000 ppm (2950 mg/m^{3})
REL (Recommended)	TWA 120 ppm (350 mg/m^{3}) C 610 ppm (1800 mg/m^{3}) [15-minute]
IDLH (Immediate danger)	1500 ppm

Related compounds
Related alkanes	Butane; Hexane

Supplementary data page
- Pentane (data page)
- Except where otherwise noted, data are given for materials in their standard state (at 25 °C [77 °F], 100 kPa). verify (what is ?) Infobox references

Pentane is an organic compound with the formula C_{5}H_{12}—that is, an alkane with five carbon atoms. The term may refer to any of three structural isomers, or to a mixture of them: in the IUPAC nomenclature, however, pentane means exclusively the n-pentane isomer, in which case pentanes refers to a mixture of them; the other two are called isopentane (methylbutane) and neopentane (dimethylpropane). Cyclopentane is not an isomer of pentane because it has only 10 hydrogen atoms where pentane has 12.

Pentanes are components of some fuels and are employed as specialty solvents in the laboratory. Their properties are very similar to those of butanes and hexanes.

== History ==
Normal pentane was discovered in 1862 by Carl Schorlemmer, who, while analyzing pyrolysis products of the cannel coal mined in Wigan, identified, separated by fractional distillation and studied a series of liquid hydrocarbons inert to nitric and sulfuric acids. The lightest of them, which he called hydride of amyl, had an empirical formula of C_{5}H_{12}, density of 0.636 at 17 °C and boiled between 39 and 40 °C. In the next year he identified the same compound in the Pennsylvanian oil. By 1872 he switched his nomenclature to the modern one, leading to it being called pentane.

Beyond Schorlemmer's initial work, scientists discovered that the molecular formula C_{5}H_{12} could represent different structural arrangements, leading to the identification of isopentane and neopentane. This discovery contributed significantly to the understanding of isomerism and hydrocarbons in the 19th century. The high volatility and low boiling point of pentane made it useful as a solvent and in fuels. Its use expanded in the 1970s as a blowing agent for foams, replacing CFCs. The petroleum refining industry utilizes pentanes, particularly isopentane, to produce high-octane fuels.

== Isomers ==
Common name	normal pentane unbranched pentane n-pentane	isopentane	neopentane
IUPAC name	pentane	2-methylbutane	2,2-dimethylpropane
Molecular diagram			
Skeletal diagram			
Melting point (°C)	−129.8	−159.9	−16.6
Boiling point (°C)	36.0	27.7	9.5
Density (0 °C, kg/m^{3})	699	616	586

== Physical properties ==
The boiling points of the pentane isomers range from about 9 to 36 °C. As is the case for other alkanes, the more thickly branched isomers tend to have lower boiling points.

The same tends to be true for the melting points of alkane isomers, and that of isopentane is 30 °C lower than that of n-pentane. However, the melting point of neopentane, the most heavily branched of the three, is 100 °C higher than that of isopentane. The anomalously high melting point of neopentane has been attributed to the tetrahedral molecules packing more closely in solid form; this explanation is contradicted by the fact that neopentane has a lower density than the other two isomers, and the high melting point is actually caused by neopentane's significantly lower entropy of fusion.

The branched isomers are more stable (have lower heat of formation and heat of combustion) than n-pentane. The difference is 1.8 kcal/mol for isopentane, and 5 kcal/mol for neopentane.

Rotation about two central single C-C bonds of n-pentane produces four different conformations.

== Production and occurrence ==
Pentane is produced by fractional distillation of petroleum and purified by rectification (successive distillations).

It occurs in alcoholic beverages and in hop oil. It is a component of exhaled breath for some individuals. A degradation product of unsaturated fatty acids, its presence is associated with some diseases and cancers.

Pentane is a relatively minor component of automobile gasoline, with its share varying within 1–6% in 1990s Sweden, 2–13% in 1990s US and 1–3% in the US in 2011. At 62, its octane number (both RON and MON) is quite low.

== Industrial uses ==
Pentanes are some of the primary blowing agents used in the production of polystyrene foam and other foams. Usually, a mixture of n-, i-, and increasingly cyclopentane is used for this purpose.

Acid-catalyzed isomerization gives isopentane, which is used in producing high-octane fuels.

Because of their low boiling points, low cost, and relative safety, pentanes are used as a working medium in geothermal power stations and organic Rankine cycles. It is also used in some blended refrigerants.

Pentanes are solvents in many ordinary products, e.g. in some pesticides.

== Laboratory use ==
Pentanes are relatively inexpensive and are the most volatile liquid alkanes at room temperature, so they are often used in the laboratory as solvents that can be conveniently and rapidly evaporated. However, because of their nonpolarity and lack of functionality, they dissolve only nonpolar and alkyl-rich compounds. Pentanes are miscible with most common nonpolar solvents such as chlorocarbons, aromatics, and ethers.

They are often used in liquid chromatography.

== Reactions ==
Like other alkanes, pentanes are largely unreactive at standard room temperature and conditions - however, with sufficient activation energy (e.g., an open flame), they readily oxidize to form carbon dioxide and water:

C_{5}H_{12} + 8 O_{2} → 5 CO_{2} + 6 H_{2}O + heat/energy

Like other alkanes, pentanes undergo free radical chlorination:

C_{5}H_{12} + Cl_{2} → C_{5}H_{11}Cl + HCl

Without zeolite catalysts, such reactions are unselective, so with n-pentane, the result is a mixture of the 1-, 2-, and 3-chloropentanes, as well as more highly chlorinated derivatives. Other radical halogenations can also occur.
