= Hexane =

Chemical compound (C6H14)

Skeletal formula of hexane
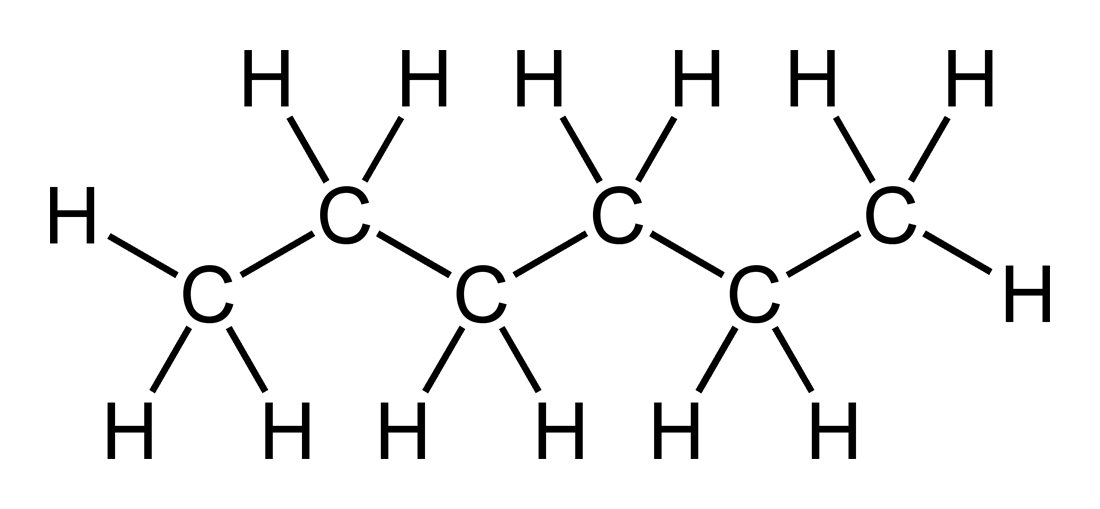
Skeletal formula of hexane with all implicit carbons shown, and all explicit hydrogens added
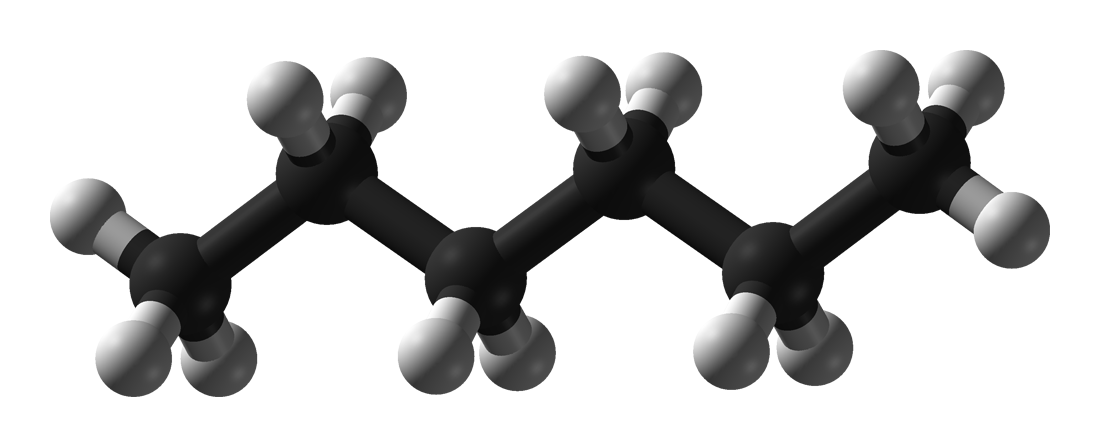
Ball and stick model of hexane
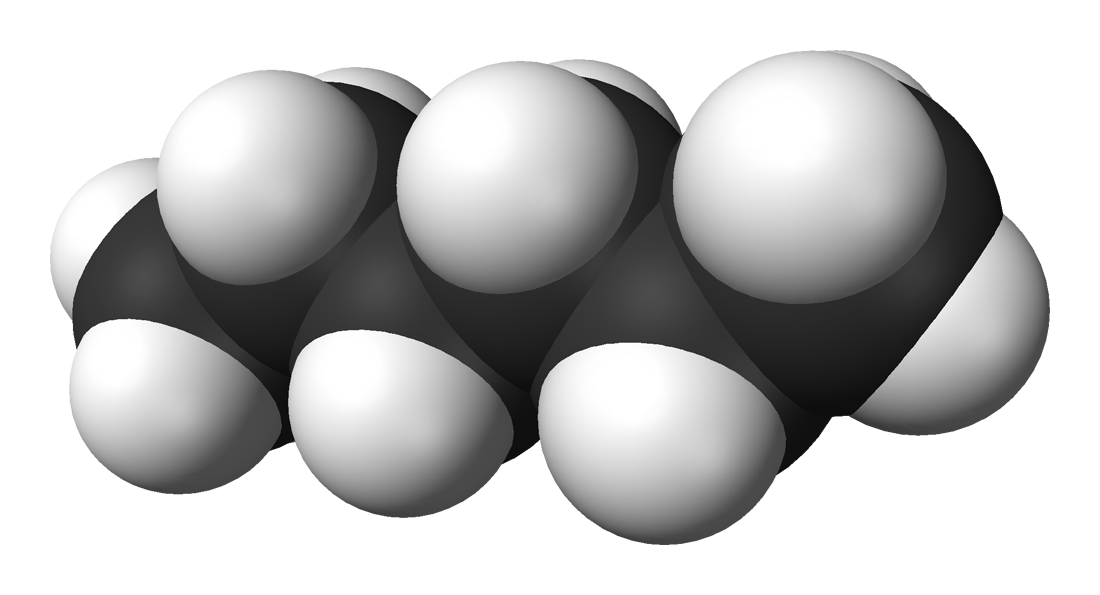
Spacefill model of hexane

Names
- Preferred IUPAC name Hexane
- Other names Sextane; Hexacarbane; Hexyl hydride

Identifiers
| CAS Number | 110-54-3 |
| 3D model (JSmol) | Interactive image |
| Beilstein Reference | 1730733 |
| ChEBI | CHEBI:29021 |
| ChEMBL | ChEMBL15939 |
| ChemSpider | 7767 |
| DrugBank | DB02764 |
| ECHA InfoCard | 100.003.435 |
| EC Number | 203-777-6 |
| Gmelin Reference | 1985 |
| KEGG | C11271 |
| MeSH | n-hexane |
| PubChem CID | 8058 |
| RTECS number | MN9275000 |
| UNII | 2DDG612ED8 |
| UN number | 1208 |
| CompTox Dashboard (EPA) | DTXSID0021917 |
- InChI: InChI=1S/C6H14/c1-3-5-6-4-2/h3-6H2,1-2H3 Key: VLKZOEOYAKHREP-UHFFFAOYSA-N
- SMILES: CCCCCC

Properties
| Chemical formula | C_{6}H_{14} |
| Molar mass | 86.178 g·mol^{−1} |
| Appearance | Colorless liquid |
| Odor | Petrolic |
| Density | 0.6606 g/mL |
| Melting point | −96 to −94 °C; −141 to −137 °F; 177 to 179 K |
| Boiling point | 68.5 to 69.1 °C; 155.2 to 156.3 °F; 341.6 to 342.2 K |
| Solubility in water | 9.5 mg L^{−1} |
| log P | 3.764 |
| Vapor pressure | 17.60 kPa (at 20.0 °C) |
| Henry's law constant (k_{H}) | 7.6 nmol Pa^{−1} kg^{−1} |
| UV-vis (λ_{max}) | 200 nm |
| Magnetic susceptibility (χ) | −74.6·10^{−6} cm^{3}/mol |
| Refractive index (n_{D}) | 1.375 |
| Viscosity | 0.3 mPa·s |
| Dipole moment | 0.08 D |

Thermochemistry
| Heat capacity (C) | 265.2 J K^{−1} mol^{−1} |
| Std molar entropy (S^{⦵}_{298}) | 296.06 J K^{−1} mol^{−1} |
| Std enthalpy of formation (Δ_{f}H^{⦵}_{298}) | −199.4–−198.0 kJ mol^{−1} |
| Std enthalpy of combustion (Δ_{c}H^{⦵}_{298}) | −4180–−4140 kJ mol^{−1} |

Hazards
- Occupational safety and health (OHS/OSH)
| Main hazards | Reproductive toxicity – After aspiration, pulmonary oedema, pneumonitis |
- GHS labelling
| Pictograms | (GHS02: Flammable) (GHS07: Exclamation mark) (GHS08: Health hazard) (GHS09: Environmental hazard) |
| Signal word | Danger |
| Hazard statements | H225, H302, H305, H315, H336, H361fd, H373, H411 |
| Precautionary statements | P201, P202, P210, P233, P235, P240, P241, P242, P243, P260, P264, P271, P273, P280, P281, P301+P330+P331, P302+P352, P303+P361+P353, P304+P340, P308+P313, P310, P312, P314, P332+P313, P363, P370+P378, P391, P403+P233, P405, P501 |
| NFPA 704 (fire diamond) | 1 3 0 |
| Flash point | −26.0 °C (−14.8 °F; 247.2 K) |
| Autoignition temperature | 234.0 °C (453.2 °F; 507.1 K) |
| Explosive limits | 1.2–7.7% |
- Lethal dose or concentration (LD, LC)
| LD_{50} (median dose) | 25 g kg^{−1} (oral, rat); 28710 mg/kg (rat, oral) |
| LD_{Lo} (lowest published) | 56137 mg/kg (rat, oral) |
- NIOSH (US health exposure limits)
| PEL (Permissible) | TWA 500 ppm (1800 mg/m^{3}) |
| REL (Recommended) | TWA 50 ppm (180 mg/m^{3}) |
| IDLH (Immediate danger) | 1100 ppm |

Related compounds
| Related alkanes | Pentane; Heptane |

Supplementary data page
- Hexane (data page)
- Except where otherwise noted, data are given for materials in their standard state (at 25 °C [77 °F], 100 kPa). verify (what is ?) Infobox references

Hexane (/ˈhɛkseɪn/) or n-hexane is an organic compound, a straight-chain alkane with six carbon atoms and the molecular formula C_{6}H_{14}.

Hexane is a colorless liquid, odorless when pure, and with a boiling point of approximately 69 °C (156 °F). It is widely used as a cheap, relatively safe, largely unreactive, and easily evaporated non-polar solvent, and modern gasoline blends contain about 3% hexane.

The term hexanes refers to a mixture, composed largely (>60%) of n-hexane, with varying amounts of the isomeric compounds 2-methylpentane and 3-methylpentane, and possibly, smaller amounts of nonisomeric C_{5}, C_{6}, and C_{7} (cyclo)alkanes. These "hexanes" mixtures are cheaper than pure hexane, and are often used in large-scale operations that don't require a single isomer (e.g., as cleaning solvent or for chromatography).

== Isomers ==
| Common name | IUPAC name | Text formula | Skeletal formula |
|---|---|---|---|
| Normal hexane, n-Hexane | Hexane | CH_{3}(CH_{2})_{4}CH_{3} | |
| Isohexane | 2-Methylpentane | (CH_{3})_{2}CH(CH_{2})_{2}CH_{3} | |
| | 3-Methylpentane | CH_{3}CH_{2}CH(CH_{3})CH_{2}CH_{3} | |
| | 2,3-Dimethylbutane | (CH_{3})_{2}CHCH(CH_{3})_{2} | |
| Neohexane | 2,2-Dimethylbutane | (CH_{3})_{3}CCH_{2}CH_{3} | |

== Uses ==
In industry, hexanes are used in the formulation of glues for shoes, leather products, and roofing. They are also used to extract cooking oils (such as canola oil or soybean oil) from seeds, for cleansing and degreasing a variety of items, and in textile manufacturing.

A typical laboratory use of hexanes is to extract oil and grease contaminants from water and soil for analysis. Since hexane cannot be easily deprotonated, it is used in the laboratory for reactions that involve very strong bases, such as the preparation of organolithiums. For example, butyllithiums are typically supplied as a hexane solution.

Hexanes are commonly used in chromatography as a non-polar solvent. Higher alkanes present as impurities in hexanes have similar retention times as the solvent, meaning that fractions containing hexane will also contain these impurities. In preparative chromatography, concentration of a large volume of hexanes can result in a sample that is appreciably contaminated by alkanes. This may result in a solid compound being obtained as an oil and the alkanes may interfere with analysis.

As an internal combustion engine fuel, n-hexane has low octane numbers; a research octane number of 24.8 and a motor octane number of 26. In 1983 its share in Japanese gasoline varied around 6%, in 1992 it was present in American gas between 1 and 3%, and in Swedish automobile fuel in the same year the share was consistently under 2%, often below 1%. By 2011 its share in US gas stood between 1 and 7%.

== Production ==
Hexane is chiefly obtained by refining crude oil. The exact composition of the fraction depends largely on the source of the oil (crude or reformed) and the constraints of the refining. The industrial product (usually around 50% by weight of the straight-chain isomer) is the fraction boiling at 65–70 °C (149–158 °F).

== Physical properties ==
All alkanes are colorless. The boiling points of the various hexanes are somewhat similar and, as for other alkanes, are generally lower for the more branched forms. The melting points are quite different and the trend is not apparent.

| Isomer | M.P. (°C) | M.P. (°F) | B.P. (°C) | B.P. (°F) |
|---|---|---|---|---|
| n-hexane | −95.3 | −139.5 | 68.7 | 155.7 |
| 3-methylpentane | −118.0 | −180.4 | 63.3 | 145.9 |
| 2-methylpentane (isohexane) | −153.7 | −244.7 | 60.3 | 140.5 |
| 2,3-dimethylbutane | −128.6 | −199.5 | 58.0 | 136.4 |
| 2,2-dimethylbutane (neohexane) | −99.8 | −147.6 | 49.7 | 121.5 |

Hexane has considerable vapor pressure at room temperature:

| Temperature (°C) | Temperature (°F) | Vapor pressure (mmHg) | Vapor pressure (kPa) |
|---|---|---|---|
| −40 | −40 | 3.36 | 0.448 |
| −30 | −22 | 7.12 | 0.949 |
| −20 | −4 | 14.01 | 1.868 |
| −10 | 14 | 25.91 | 3.454 |
| 0 | 32 | 45.37 | 6.049 |
| 10 | 50 | 75.74 | 10.098 |
| 20 | 68 | 121.26 | 16.167 |
| 25 | 77 | 151.28 | 20.169 |
| 30 | 86 | 187.11 | 24.946 |
| 40 | 104 | 279.42 | 37.253 |
| 50 | 122 | 405.31 | 54.037 |
| 60 | 140 | 572.76 | 76.362 |

== Reactivity ==
Like most alkanes, hexanes typically exhibit low reactivity and are suitable solvents for reactive compounds. Commercial samples of n-hexane however often contains methylcyclopentane, which features tertiary C-H bonds, which are incompatible with some radical reactions.

== Safety ==
Inhalation of n-hexane at 5000 ppm for 10 minutes produces marked vertigo; 2500-1000 ppm for 12 hours produces drowsiness, fatigue, loss of appetite, and paresthesia in the distal extremities; 2500–5000 ppm produces muscle weakness, cold pulsation in the extremities, blurred vision, headache, and anorexia. Chronic occupational exposure to elevated levels of n-hexane has been demonstrated to be associated with peripheral neuropathy in auto mechanics in the US, and neurotoxicity in workers in printing presses, and shoe and furniture factories in Asia, Europe, and North America.

The US National Institute for Occupational Safety and Health (NIOSH) has set a recommended exposure limit (REL) for hexane isomers (not n-hexane) of 100 ppm (350 mg/m^{3} (0.15 gr/cu ft)) over an 8-hour workday. However, for n-hexane, the current NIOSH REL is 50 ppm (180 mg/m^{3} (0.079 gr/cu ft)) over an 8-hour workday. This limit was proposed as a permissible exposure limit (PEL) by the Occupational Safety and Health Administration in 1989; however, this PEL was overruled in US courts in 1992. The current n-hexane PEL in the US is 500 ppm (1,800 mg/m^{3} (0.79 gr/cu ft)).

Hexane and other volatile hydrocarbons (petroleum ether) present an aspiration risk. n-Hexane is sometimes used as a denaturant for alcohol, and as a cleaning agent in the textile, furniture, and leather industries. It is slowly being replaced with other solvents.

Like gasoline, hexane is highly volatile and is an explosion risk.

=== Incidents ===
The 1981 Louisville sewer explosions, which destroyed over 13 mi (21 km) of sewer lines and streets in the Kentucky city, were caused by ignition of hexane vapors which had been illegally discharged from a soybean processing plant owned by Ralston-Purina.

Hexane was attributed as the cause of an explosion that occurred in the National University of Río Cuarto, Argentina on 5 December 2007, due to a hexane spill near a heat-producing machine that exploded, producing a fire that killed one student and injured 24 more.

Occupational hexane poisoning has occurred with Japanese sandal workers, Italian shoe workers, Taiwan press proofing workers, and others. Analysis of Taiwanese workers has shown occupational exposure to substances including n-hexane. In 2010–2011, Chinese workers manufacturing iPhones were reported to have suffered hexane poisoning.

=== Biotransformation ===
n-Hexane is biotransformed to 2-hexanol and further to 2,5-hexanediol in the body. The conversion is catalyzed by the enzyme cytochrome P450 utilizing oxygen from air. 2,5-Hexanediol may be further oxidized to 2,5-hexanedione, which is neurotoxic and produces a polyneuropathy. In view of this behavior, replacement of n-hexane as a solvent has been discussed. n-Heptane is a possible alternative.

== See also ==
- Cyclohexane
- Perfluorohexane
