= Tetrapropyltin =

Organotin compound

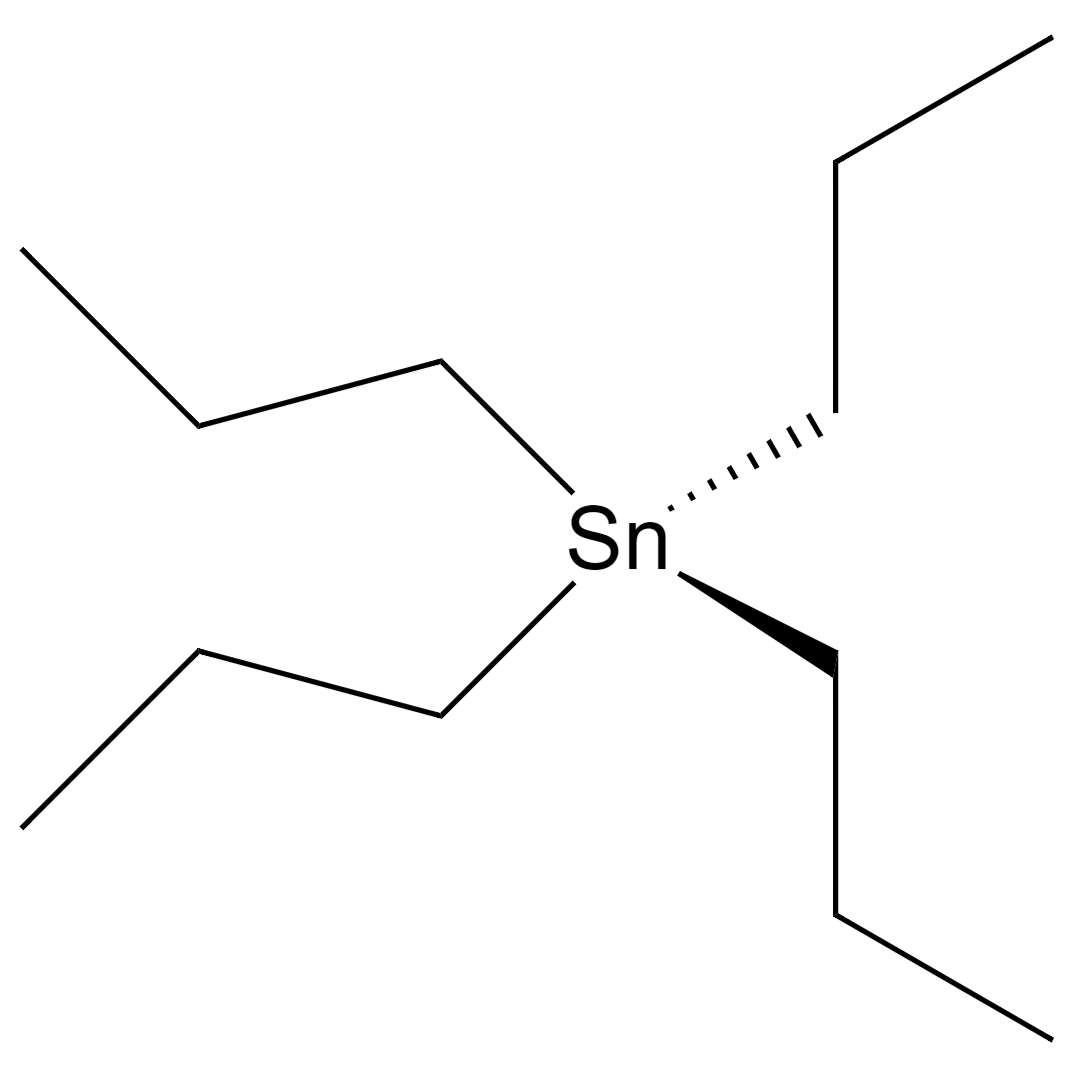

Names
- IUPAC name Tetrapropylstannane
- Other names Tetra-n-propyltin

Identifiers
CAS Number	2176-98-9
3D model (JSmol)	Interactive image
ChemSpider	15725
ECHA InfoCard	100.016.851
EC Number	218-536-0
PubChem CID	16585
UNII	J6MEB62J4V
CompTox Dashboard (EPA)	DTXSID70176160
- InChI: InChI=1S/4C3H7.Sn/c4*1-3-2;/h4*1,3H2,2H3;
- SMILES: CCC[Sn](CCC)(CCC)CCC

Properties
Chemical formula	(CH_{3}CH_{2}CH_{2})_{4}Sn
Molar mass	291.066 g·mol^{−1}
Appearance	Colorless oily liquid
Odor	Unpleasant
Density	1.11 g/cm^{3} (20 °C)
Boiling point	222 °C (432 °F; 495 K)
Solubility	Slightly soluble in chloroform, ethyl acetate and methanol.

Hazards
- Occupational safety and health (OHS/OSH)
Main hazards	Toxic
- GHS labelling
Pictograms	(GHS06: Toxic) (GHS07: Exclamation mark) (GHS08: Health hazard) (GHS09: Environmental hazard)
Signal word	Danger
Hazard statements	H301, H302, H311, H315, H317, H319, H330, H334, H372, H410
Precautionary statements	P260, P264, P270, P271, P272, P273, P280, P284, P301+P316, P302+P352, P304+P340, P305, P312, P316, P320, P321, P330, P333+P313, P338, P342, P351, P361+P364, P362+P364, P403+P233, P405, P501

Related compounds
Related tetraalkylstannanes	Tetramethyltin; Tetraethyltin; Tetrabutyltin
- Except where otherwise noted, data are given for materials in their standard state (at 25 °C [77 °F], 100 kPa). Infobox references

Tetrapropyltin is an organotin compound with the formula (CH_{3}CH_{2}CH_{2})_{4}Sn. It is a toxic colorless oily liquid. It reacts with strong oxidizing agents. This chemical irritates the skin, eyes and respiratory system. It is very toxic to aquatic life with long-lasting effects. It can be absorbed through the skin, causing toxic effects on the body. Tetrapropyltin is an intermediate in the synthesis of dipropyltin dichloride.
