= Stasik =

Stasik may refer to:

- Mirosław Stasik, a toxicologist
- Ryan Stasik, an American musician for rock band Umphrey's McGee
- Asteroid 4131 Stasik
- A diminutive for Stanisław
