= Tetramethyllead =

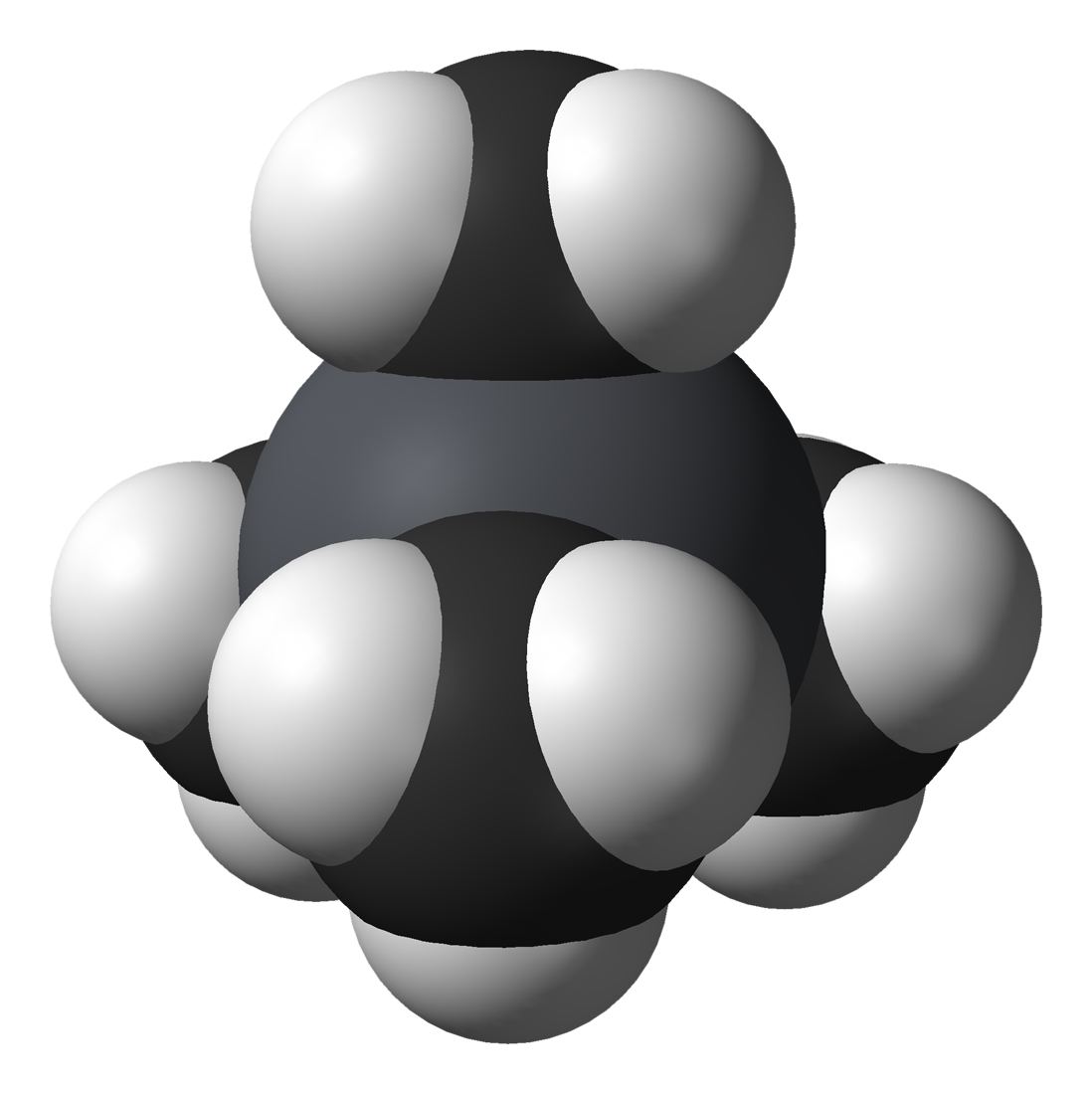

Names
- Other names Tetramethylplumbane

Identifiers
CAS Number	75-74-1
3D model (JSmol)	Interactive image
Beilstein Reference	3902986
ChEBI	CHEBI:30183
ChemSpider	6154
ECHA InfoCard	100.000.816
EC Number	200-897-0
Gmelin Reference	2491
PubChem CID	6394
RTECS number	TP4725000
UNII	C7J62Z32IW
UN number	1649 3082
CompTox Dashboard (EPA)	DTXSID0026123
- InChI: InChI=1S/4CH3.Pb/h4*1H3; Key: XOOGZRUBTYCLHG-UHFFFAOYSA-N
- SMILES: C[Pb](C)(C)C

Properties
Chemical formula	C_{4}H_{12}Pb
Molar mass	267.3 g·mol^{−1}
Appearance	Clear, highly refractive liquid
Odor	Sweet
Density	1.995 g/cm^{3} (at 20 °C)
Melting point	−27.5 °C (−17.5 °F; 245.7 K)
Boiling point	110 °C (230 °F; 383 K) (but very high vapor pressure)
Solubility in water	Ether, absolute (not 96%) alcohol

Hazards
- GHS labelling
Pictograms	(GHS02: Flammable) (GHS06: Toxic) (GHS07: Exclamation mark) (GHS08: Health hazard) (GHS09: Environmental hazard)
Signal word	Danger
Hazard statements	H226, H300+H310+H330, H360, H373, H410
Precautionary statements	P201, P202, P210, P233, P240, P241, P242, P243, P260, P262, P264, P270, P271, P273, P280, P281, P284, P301+P310, P301+P312, P302+P350, P303+P361+P353, P304+P312, P304+P340, P308+P313, P310, P312, P314, P320, P321, P330, P361, P363, P370+P378, P391, P403+P233, P403+P235, P405, P501
NFPA 704 (fire diamond)	4 3 3
Flash point	37.8 °C (100.0 °F; 310.9 K) closed cup

Related compounds
Other cations	Neopentane; Tetramethylsilane; Tetramethylgermanium; Tetramethyltin
Related compounds	Tetraethyllead
- Except where otherwise noted, data are given for materials in their standard state (at 25 °C [77 °F], 100 kPa). Infobox references

Tetramethyllead, also called tetra methyllead and lead tetramethyl, is a chemical compound used as an antiknock additive for gasoline. It is a methyl radical synthon. Its use in gasoline is being phased out for environmental considerations.

The National Institute for Occupational Safety and Health (NIOSH) in the United States has identified tetramethyllead as a potential workplace hazard. The recommended time-weighted average exposure limit to tetramethyllead is 0.075 milligrams per cubic meter during a 10-hour workday; the OSHA permissible exposure limit is the same value assuming an 8-hour workday.

Exposure to tetramethyllead can affect the central nervous system, the kidneys, and the cardiovascular system. Tetramethyllead can be absorbed through inhalation, through eye contact, through skin absorption, and by ingesting the substance. Symptoms of exposure include insomnia, coma, seizure, mania, delirium, loss of appetite, nausea, hypotension, anxiety, restlessness, and nightmares. First aid measures for exposure include artificial respiration, immediate eye irrigation, and immediate washing with water. Immediate medical attention should be sought if tetramethyllead is ingested.

High heat can cause tetramethyllead to explosively decompose. Consequently it cannot be stored pure in sealed containers.

Tetramethyllead may be synthesized from disproportionate transmetalation of the quasi-Grignard reagent methylmagnesium chloride onto plumbous chloride:

PbCl_{2} + MeMgCl → PbMe_{4} + Pb + MgCl_{2}

The process requires substantial care, as both methyl chloride and tetramethyllead are extremely volatile.

== See also ==
- Tetraethyllead
