= Octel =

Octel may refer to:

- Octel Corporation, former name of American specialty chemical company Innospec
- Octel Communications, voicemail company acquired by Lucent

== See also ==
- Octal
- Octol
