= Thomas Midgley Jr. =

American chemist and engineer (1889–1944)

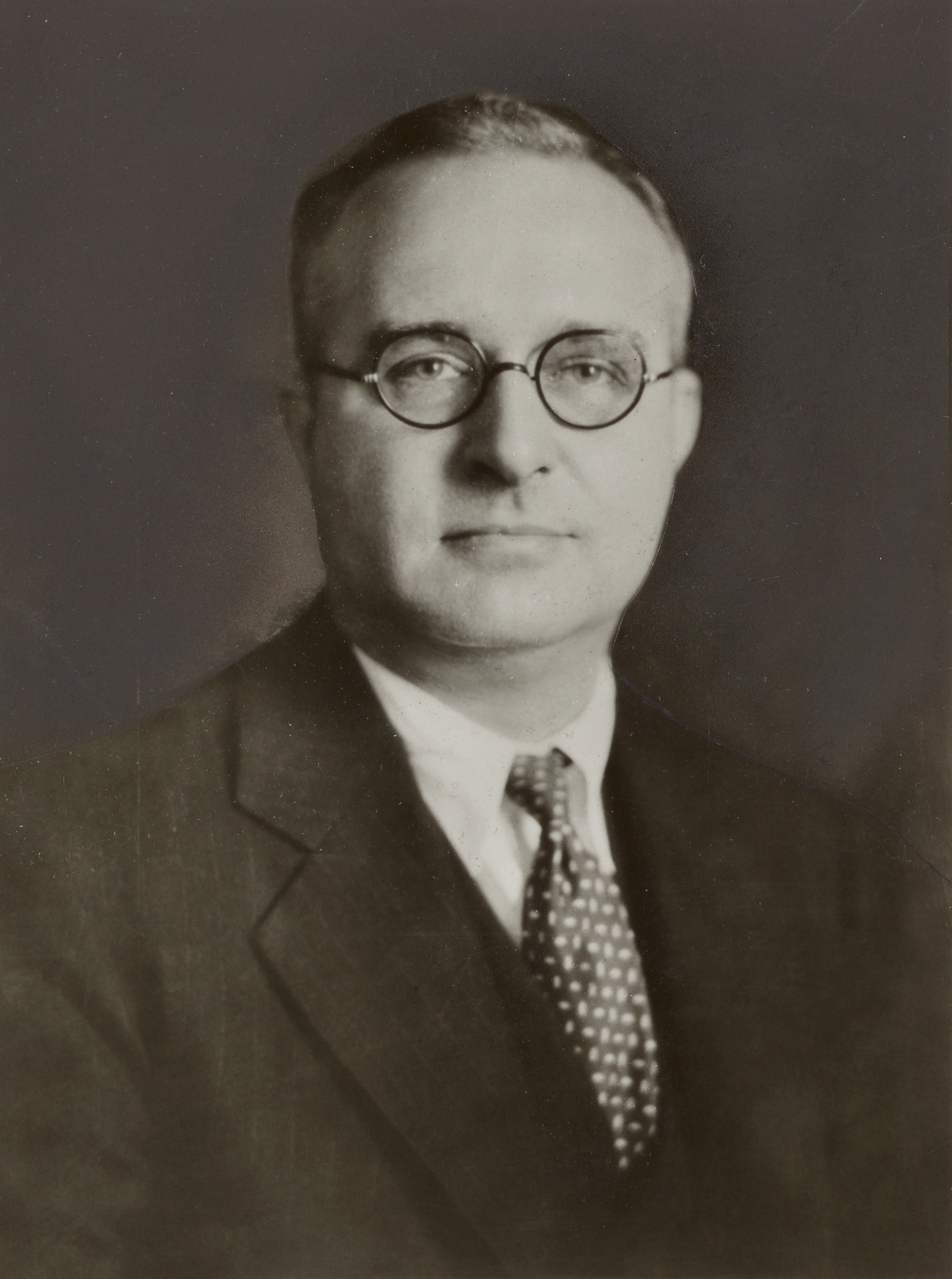
- Midgley c. 1930s–1940s
- Born: May 18, 1889; Beaver Falls, Pennsylvania, U.S.
- Died: November 2, 1944 (aged 55); Worthington, Ohio, U.S.
- Education: Cornell University
- Known for: Leaded gasoline; CFCs
- Spouse: Carrie Reynolds (m. 1911)
- Awards: William H. Nichols Medal (1922); Longstreth Medal (1925); Perkin Medal (1937); Priestley Medal (1941); Willard Gibbs Award (1942)
- Scientific career
- Fields: Mechanical engineering; chemical engineering

Thomas Midgley Jr. (May 18, 1889 – November 2, 1944) was an American mechanical and chemical engineer. He played a major role in developing leaded gasoline (tetraethyl lead) and some of the first chlorofluorocarbons (CFCs), better known in the United States by the brand name Freon; both products were later banned from common use due to their harmful impact on human health and the environment. He was granted more than 100 patents over the course of his career.

Midgley contracted polio in 1940 and lost the use of his legs; in 1944, he was found strangled to death by a device he devised to allow him to get out of bed unassisted. It is often reported that he had been accidentally killed by his own invention, but his death was declared by the coroner to be a suicide.

While the harmful effects of CFCs were not understood until decades after Midgley's death, tetraethyl lead was known to be acutely toxic by those involved in the development of leaded gasoline. This included Midgley, who publicly insisted that there was nonetheless no health hazard posed by the use of leaded gasoline in internal combustion engines.

== Early life ==
Thomas Midgley Jr. was born in Beaver Falls, Pennsylvania, on May 18, 1889, the son of Hattie Louise (née Emerson; 1865–1950) and Thomas Midgley Sr. (1840–1934). His family had a history of inventing; his father was an inventor in the field of automobile tires while his maternal grandfather, James Emerson, invented the inserted tooth saw. He grew up in Columbus, Ohio, and graduated from Cornell University in 1911 with a degree in mechanical engineering.

Early on, Midgley had a penchant for finding useful applications for known substances. In high school, he used the chewed bark of slippery elm trees to give baseballs a more curved trajectory, a practice professional players would later pick up. Later in life, he was known to always carry a copy of the periodic table, his main tool in the search for the substance that would mark his breakthrough invention.

== Career ==
=== Leaded gasoline ===
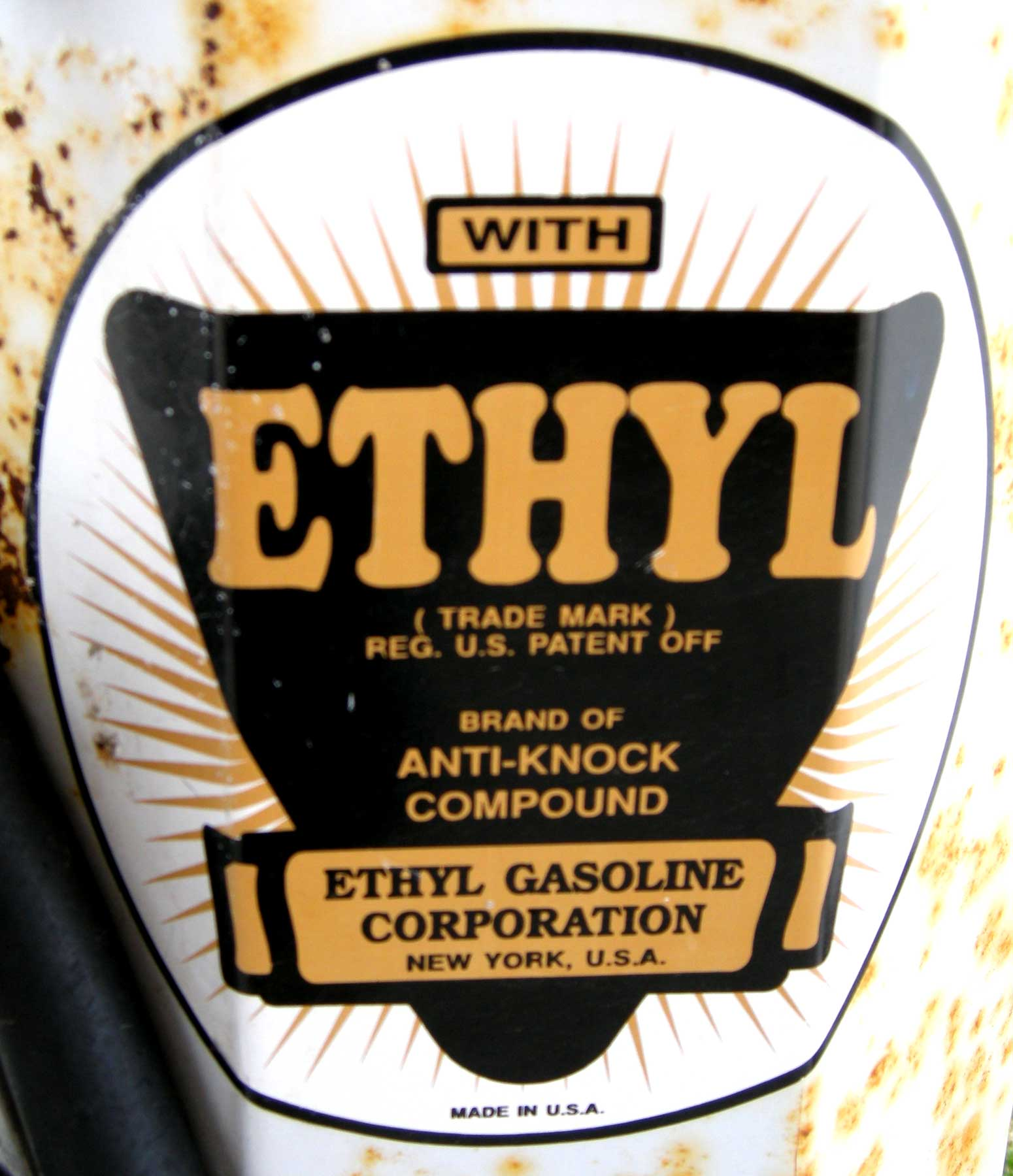
Sign on an antique gasoline pump advertising the TEL anti-knock compound Ethyl, a gasoline additive

In 1916, Midgley began working at General Motors. In December 1921, while working under the direction of Charles Kettering at Dayton Research Laboratories, a subsidiary of General Motors, he discovered (after discarding tellurium due to the difficult-to-eradicate smell) that the addition of tetraethyllead (TEL) to gasoline prevented knocking in internal combustion engines. The company named the substance "Ethyl", avoiding all mention of lead in reports and advertising. Oil companies and automobile manufacturers (especially General Motors, which owned the patent jointly filed by Kettering and Midgley) promoted the TEL additive as an inexpensive alternative superior to ethanol or ethanol-blended fuels, on which they could make very little profit. In December 1922, the American Chemical Society awarded Midgley the 1923 Nichols Medal for the "Use of Anti-Knock Compounds in Motor Fuels". This was the first of several major awards he earned during his career.

In 1923, Midgley took a long vacation in Miami to cure himself of lead poisoning. He said, "I find that my lungs have been affected and that it is necessary to drop all work and get a large supply of fresh air." That year, General Motors created the General Motors Chemical Company (GMCC) to supervise the production of TEL by the DuPont company. Kettering was elected as president with Midgley as vice president. However, after two deaths and several cases of lead poisoning at the TEL prototype plant in Dayton, Ohio, the staff at Dayton was said in 1924 to be "depressed to the point of considering giving up the whole tetraethyl lead program". Over the course of the next year, eight more people died at DuPont's plant in Deepwater, New Jersey. In 1924, dissatisfied with the speed of DuPont's TEL production using the "bromide process", General Motors and the Standard Oil Company of New Jersey (now known as ExxonMobil) created the Ethyl Gasoline Corporation to produce and market TEL. Ethyl Corporation built a new chemical plant using a high-temperature ethyl chloride process at the Bayway Refinery in New Jersey. However, within the first two months of its operation, the new plant was plagued by more cases of lead poisoning, hallucinations, insanity, and five deaths.

The risks associated with exposure to lead have been known at least since the 2nd century BC, while efforts to limit lead's use date back to at least the 16th century. Midgley experienced lead poisoning himself, and was warned about the risk of lead poisoning from TEL as early as 1922. Midgley knew well the hazards of lead. He investigated whether the risks, both in production and use, could be managed. Testing on the exhaust was completed, which he used to support the idea that 1 part tetraethyl lead per 1300 of gasoline could safely be used. After the initial worker exposures, controls were developed to allow the process to operate safely. Leaded gasoline use grew exponentially. The cumulative chronic impacts of environmental lead were grossly underestimated.

On October 30, 1924, Midgley participated in a press conference to demonstrate the apparent safety of TEL, in which he poured TEL over his hands, placed a bottle of the chemical under his nose, and inhaled its vapor for sixty seconds, declaring that he could do this every day without succumbing to any problems. However, the state of New Jersey ordered the Bayway plant to be closed a few days later, and Jersey Standard was forbidden to manufacture TEL again without state permission. Production was restarted in 1926 after intervention by the federal government; high-octane fuel, enabled by lead, was of military importance. Midgley later took a leave of absence from work after being diagnosed with lead poisoning. He was relieved of his position as vice president of GMCC in April 1925, reportedly due to his inexperience in organizational matters, but he remained an employee of General Motors.

=== Freon ===
In the late 1920s, air conditioning and refrigeration systems employed compounds such as ammonia (NH_{3}), chloromethane (CH_{3}Cl), propane, methyl formate (HCO_{2}CH_{3}), and sulfur dioxide (SO_{2}) as refrigerants. Though effective, these were toxic, flammable, or explosive. The Frigidaire division of General Motors, at that time a leading manufacturer of such systems, sought a non-toxic, non-flammable alternative to these refrigerants.

Midgley, working with Albert Leon Henne, soon narrowed his focus to alkyl halides (the combination of carbon chains and halogens), which were known to be highly volatile (a requirement for a refrigerant) and also chemically inert. They eventually settled on the concept of incorporating fluorine into a hydrocarbon. They rejected the assumption that such compounds would be toxic, believing that the stability of the carbon–fluorine bond would be sufficient to prevent the release of hydrogen fluoride or other potential breakdown products. The team eventually synthesized dichlorodifluoromethane, the first chlorofluorocarbon (CFC), which they named "Freon". This compound is more commonly referred to today as "Freon 12", or "R12".

Freon and other CFCs soon largely replaced other refrigerants, but also had other applications. A notable example was their use as a propellant in aerosol products and asthma inhalers. The Society of Chemical Industry awarded Midgley the Perkin Medal in 1937 for this work. In 1941, the American Chemical Society gave Midgley its highest award, the Priestley Medal. This was followed by the Willard Gibbs Award in 1942. He also held two honorary degrees and was elected to the United States National Academy of Sciences. In 1944, he was elected president and chairman of the American Chemical Society.

== Death ==
In 1940, at the age of 51, Midgley contracted polio, leaving him permanently paralyzed from the legs down. He devised an elaborate system of ropes and pulleys to lift himself out of bed. On November 2, 1944, at the age of 55, he was found dead at his home in Worthington, Ohio. He had been killed by his own device after he became entangled in it and died of strangulation. His death was ruled a suicide by the coroner. He left behind a widow, Carrie M. Reynolds from Delaware, Ohio, whom he had married on August 3, 1911.

== Legacy ==
Midgley's legacy is tied in with the negative environmental impact of leaded gasoline and freon. Environmental historian J. R. McNeill opined that Midgley "had more adverse impact on the atmosphere than any other single organism in Earth's history", and Bill Bryson remarked that Midgley possessed "an instinct for the regrettable that was almost uncanny". Fred Pearce, writing for New Scientist, described Midgley as a "one-man environmental disaster".

Use of leaded gasoline, which he invented, released large quantities of lead into the atmosphere all over the world. High atmospheric lead levels have been linked with serious long-term health problems from childhood, including neurological impairment, and with increased levels of violence and criminality in America and around the world. Time magazine included both leaded gasoline and CFCs on its list of "The 50 Worst Inventions".

Midgley died three decades before the ozone-depleting and greenhouse gas effects of CFCs in the atmosphere became widely known. In 1987, the Montreal Protocol phased out the use of CFCs like Freon.

The harm of leaded gasoline and chlorofluorocarbons have been framed as lessons in known unknowns and unknown unknowns, respectively. When leaded gasoline was invented it was known that lead had harmful effects on human health in large quantities, and that leaded gasoline caused emissions of trace amounts of lead to the atmosphere, but it was not known whether those trace amounts had adverse effects. The existence of the ozone layer, however, and the potential for chlorofluorocarbons to harm it, was not known at the time.

In 2024, it was announced that screenwriter Terence Winter was co-writing a feature film about Midgley entitled Midge.
