= Tetramethyltin =

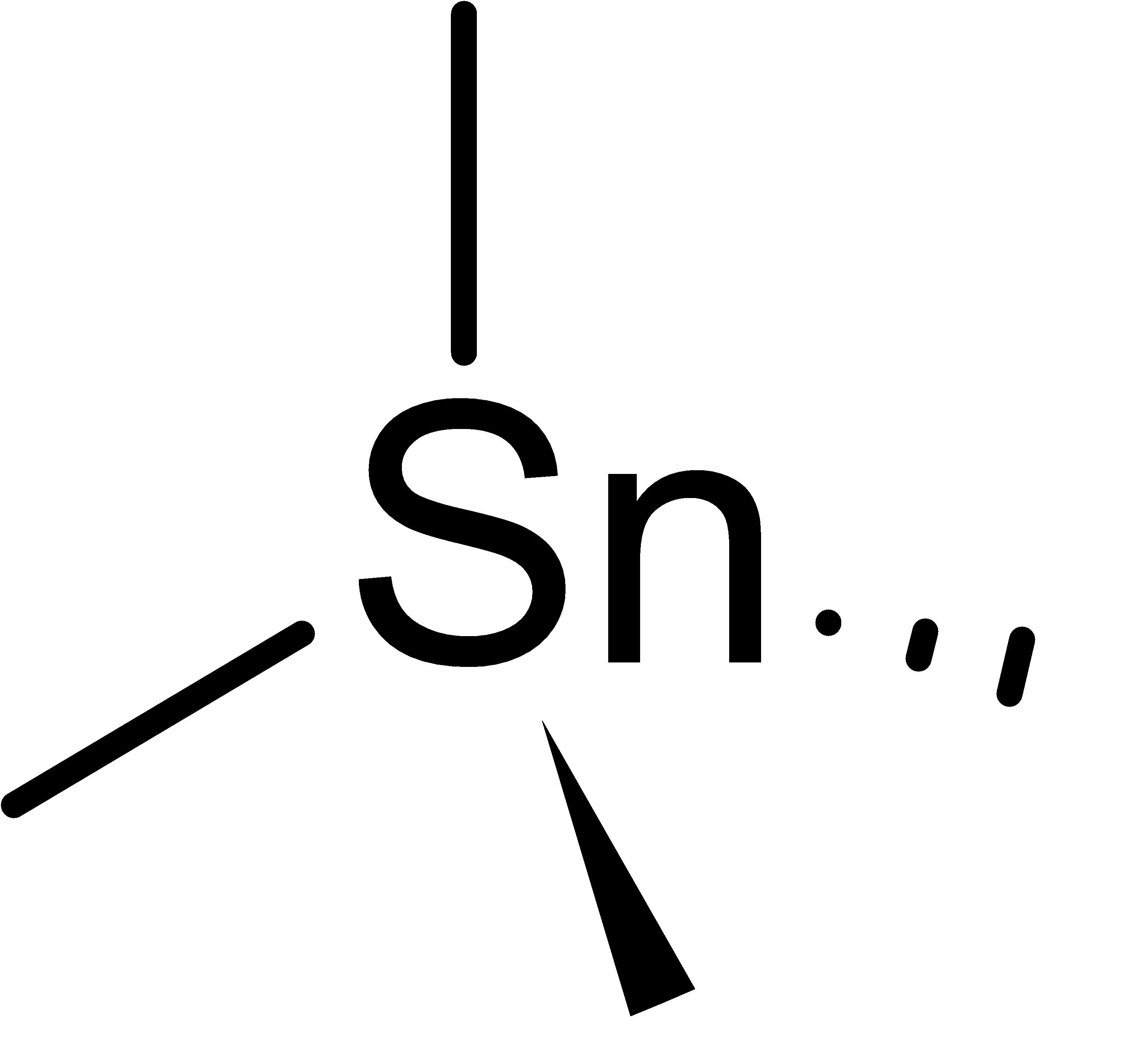

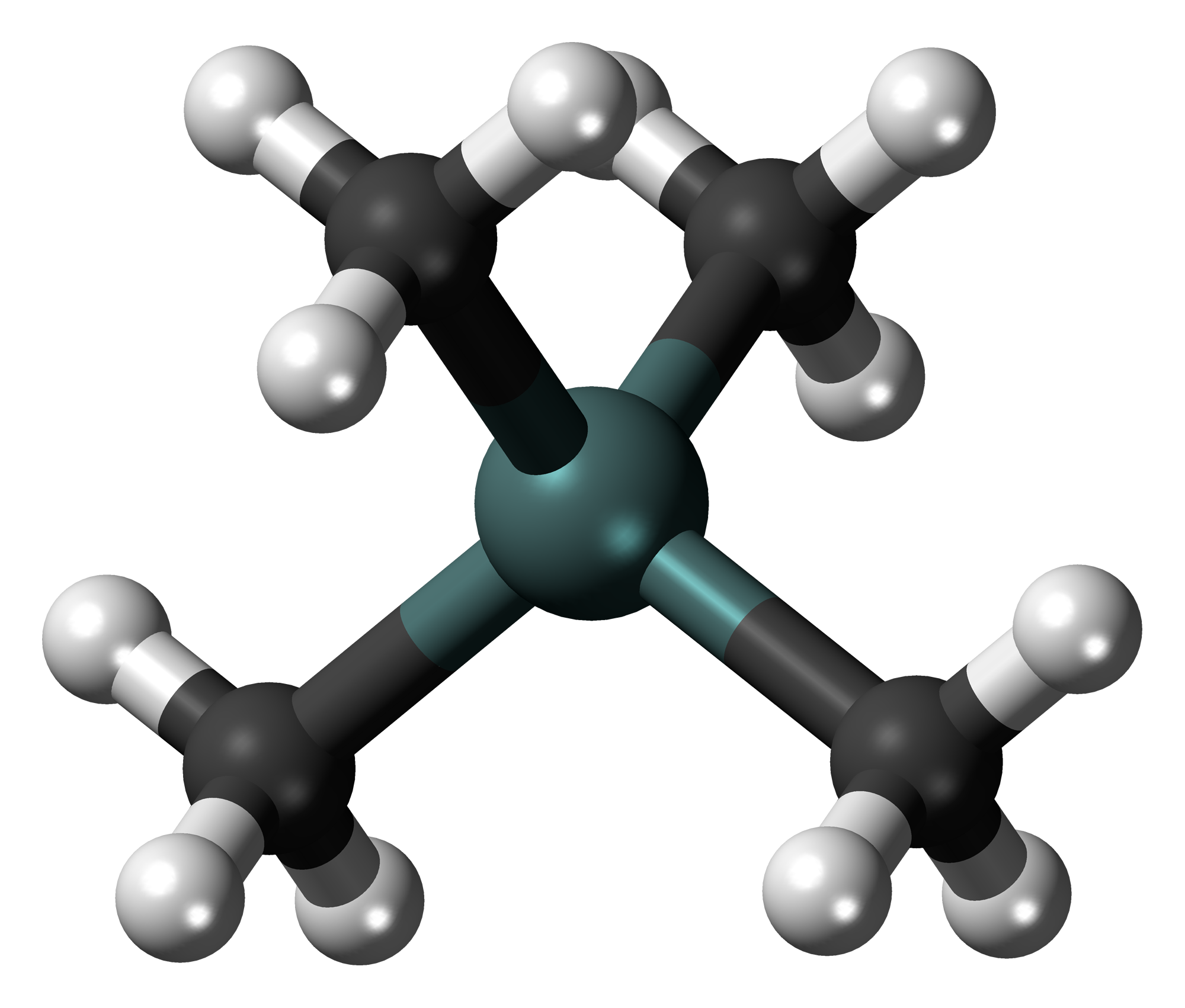

Names
- Preferred IUPAC name Tetramethylstannane
- Other names Tin tetramethyl

Identifiers
| CAS Number | 594-27-4 |
| 3D model (JSmol) | Interactive image |
| Beilstein Reference | 3647887 |
| ChEBI | CHEBI:30420 |
| ChemSpider | 11171 |
| ECHA InfoCard | 100.008.941 |
| EC Number | 209-833-6 |
| Gmelin Reference | 1938 |
| PubChem CID | 11661 |
| RTECS number | WH8630000 |
| UNII | 8V4XU9DPBK |
| UN number | 3384 |
| CompTox Dashboard (EPA) | DTXSID4052261 |
- InChI: InChI=1S/4CH3.Sn/h4*1H3; Key: VXKWYPOMXBVZSJ-UHFFFAOYSA-N
- SMILES: C[Sn](C)(C)C

Properties
| Chemical formula | C_{4}H_{12}Sn |
| Molar mass | 178.850 g·mol^{−1} |
| Appearance | Colorless liquid |
| Density | 1.291 g cm^{−3} |
| Melting point | −54 °C (−65 °F; 219 K) |
| Boiling point | 74 to 76 °C (165 to 169 °F; 347 to 349 K) |

Hazards
- GHS labelling
| Pictograms | (GHS02: Flammable) (GHS06: Toxic) (GHS09: Environmental hazard) |
| Signal word | Danger |
| Hazard statements | H225, H300, H310, H330, H410 |
| Precautionary statements | P210, P233, P240, P241, P242, P243, P260, P262, P264, P270, P271, P273, P280, P284, P301+P310, P302+P350, P303+P361+P353, P304+P340, P310, P320, P321, P330, P361, P363, P370+P378, P391, P403+P233, P403+P235, P405, P501 |
| NFPA 704 (fire diamond) | 3 4 1 |
| Flash point | −12 °C (10 °F; 261 K) |

Related compounds
| Related tetraalkylstannanes | Tetraethyltin; Tetrapropyltin; Tetrabutyltin |
| Related compounds | Neopentane; Tetramethylsilane; Tetramethylgermane; Tetramethylplumbane |
- Except where otherwise noted, data are given for materials in their standard state (at 25 °C [77 °F], 100 kPa). verify (what is ?) Infobox references

Tetramethyltin is an organometallic compound with the formula (CH_{3})_{4}Sn. This liquid, one of the simplest organotin compounds, is useful for transition-metal mediated conversion of acid chlorides to methyl ketones and aryl halides to aryl methyl ketones. It is volatile and toxic, so care should be taken when using it in the laboratory.

== Synthesis and structure ==
Tetramethyltin is synthesized by reaction of the Grignard reagent methylmagnesium iodide, with tin tetrachloride, which is synthesized by reacting tin metal with chlorine gas.

4 CH_{3}MgI + SnCl_{4} → (CH_{3})_{4}Sn + 4 MgICl

In tetramethyltin, the metal surrounded by four methyl groups in a tetrahedral structure is a heavy analogue of neopentane.

== Applications ==
=== Precursor to methyltin compounds ===
Tetramethyltin is a precursor to trimethyltin chloride (and related methyltin halides), which are precursors to other organotin compounds. These methyltin chlorides are prepared via the so-called Kocheshkov redistribution reaction. Thus, (CH_{3})_{4}Sn and SnCl_{4} are allowed to react at temperatures between 100 °C and 200 °C to give (CH_{3})_{3}SnCl as a product:

SnCl_{4} + 3 (CH_{3})_{4}Sn → 4 (CH_{3})_{3}SnCl

A second route to trimethyltin chloride utilizing tetramethyltin involves the reaction of mercury(II) chloride to react with (CH_{3})_{4}Sn.

HgCl_{2} + (CH_{3})_{4}Sn → Me_{3}SnCl + MeHgCl

A variety of methyltin compounds are used as precursors for stabilizers in PVC. Di- and trimercaptotin compounds are used to inhibit the dehydrochlorination, which is the pathway for photolytic and thermal degradation of PVC.

=== Surface functionalization ===
Tetramethyltin decomposes in the gas phase at about 277 °C; (CH_{3})_{4}Sn vapor reacts with silica to give a (CH_{3})_{3}Sn-grafted solid.

(CH_{3})_{4}Sn + ≡SiOH → ≡SiOSn(CH_{3})_{3} + MeH

This reaction is also possible with other alkyl substituents. In a similar process, tetramethyltin has been used to functionalize certain zeolites at temperatures as low as −90 °C.

== Applications in organic synthesis ==
In organic synthesis, tetramethyltin undergoes palladium-catalyzed coupling reactions with acid chlorides to give methyl ketones:

SnMe_{4} + RCOCl → RCOMe + Me_{3}SnCl
