= Tetrabutyltin =

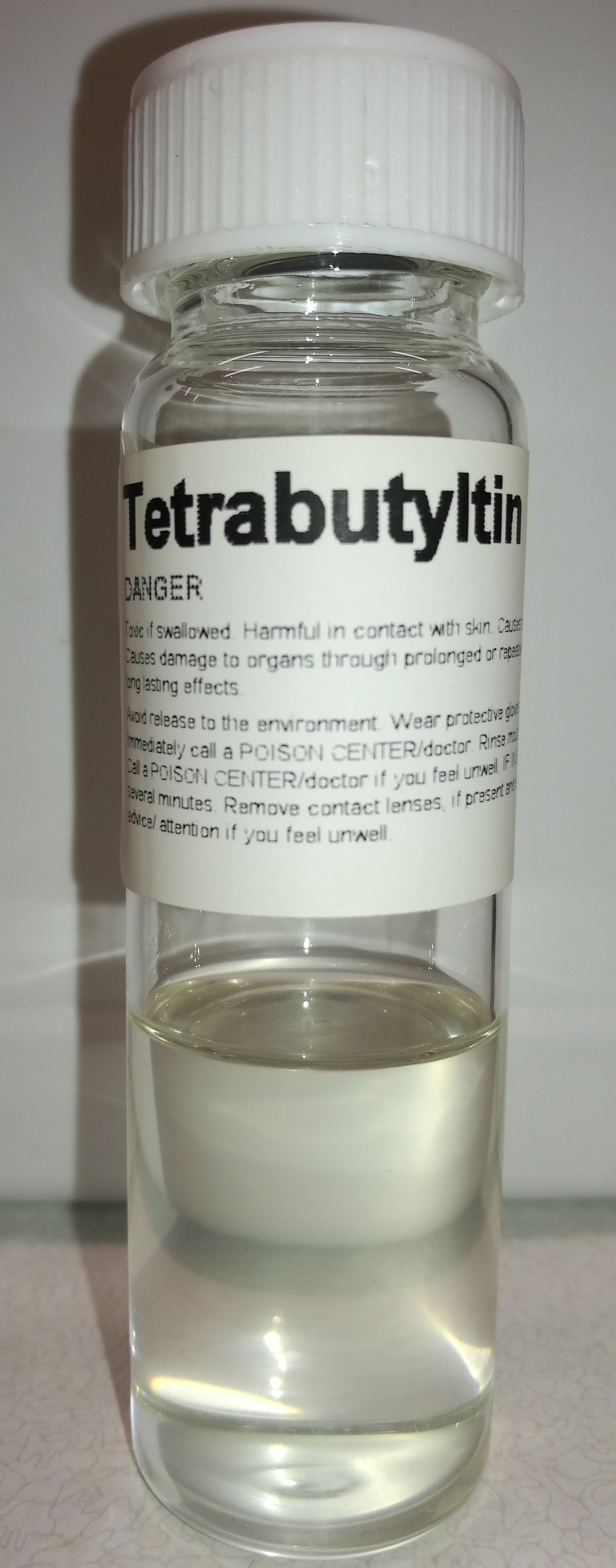

Names
- Preferred IUPAC name Tetrabutylstannane
- Other names Tetra-n-butyltin; Tetra-n-butylstannane

Identifiers
CAS Number	1461-25-2
3D model (JSmol)	Interactive image
ChemSpider	14370
ECHA InfoCard	100.014.510
PubChem CID	15098
UNII	QJ7Y5V377V
CompTox Dashboard (EPA)	DTXSID4022153
- InChI: InChI=1S/4C4H9.Sn/c4*1-3-4-2;/h4*1,3-4H2,2H3; Key: AFCAKJKUYFLYFK-UHFFFAOYSA-N; InChI=1/4C4H9.Sn/c4*1-3-4-2;/h4*1,3-4H2,2H3;/rC16H36Sn/c1-5-9-13-17(14-10-6-2,15-11-7-3)16-12-8-4/h5-16H2,1-4H3 Key: AFCAKJKUYFLYFK-HBOYHTFSAP
- SMILES: CCCC[Sn](CCCC)(CCCC)CCCC

Properties
Chemical formula	Sn(CH_{2}CH_{2}CH_{2}CH_{3})_{4}
Molar mass	347.174 g·mol^{−1}
Appearance	Colourless liquid
Density	1.054 g/cm3
Melting point	−97 °C (−143 °F; 176 K)
Boiling point	245 °C (473 °F; 518 K)
Solubility in water	insoluble
Solubility	non-polar solvents such as benzene, ether, or THF

Hazards
- GHS labelling
Pictograms	(GHS06: Toxic) (GHS08: Health hazard) (GHS09: Environmental hazard)
Signal word	Danger
Hazard statements	H301, H312, H315, H319, H410
Precautionary statements	P273, P280, P301+P310+P330, P302+P352+P312, P305+P351+P338, P314
Flash point	107 °C (225 °F; 380 K)
Safety data sheet (SDS)	Tetrabutyltin

Related compounds
Related tetraalkylstannanes	Tetramethyltin; Tetraethyltin; Tetrapropyltin
- Except where otherwise noted, data are given for materials in their standard state (at 25 °C [77 °F], 100 kPa). verify (what is ?) Infobox references

Tetrabutyltin is the organotin compound with the molecular formula Sn(CH_{2}CH_{2}CH_{2}CH_{3})_{4} or SnBu_{4}, where Bu is butyl −CH_{2}CH_{2}CH_{2}CH_{3}. Sometimes abbreviated TTBT, it is a colorless, lipophilic oil.

Tetrabutyltin is a precursor to tributyltin and dibutyltin compounds. By the redistribution reaction with tin(IV) chloride it forms tributyltin chloride and dibutyltin chloride. These compounds are starting materials for a wide range of organotin compounds used as stabilizers for PVC and as biocides, fungicides, wood preservatives, and (historically) marine anti-biofouling agents.
