= MTBE controversy =

Controversy about the gasoline/petrol additive

The MTBE controversy concerns methyl tert-butyl ether (MTBE), a gasoline additive that replaced tetraethyllead. MTBE is an oxygenate and raises gasoline's octane number. Its use declined in the United States in response to environmental and health concerns. It has polluted groundwater due to MTBE-containing gasoline being spilled or leaked at gas stations. MTBE spreads more easily underground than other gasoline components due to its higher solubility in water. Cost estimates for removing MTBE from groundwater and contaminated soil range from $1 billion to $30 billion, including removing the compound from aquifers and municipal water supplies, and replacing leaky underground oil tanks. Who will pay for remediation is controversial. In one case, the cost to oil companies to clean up the MTBE in wells belonging to the city of Santa Monica, California is estimated to exceed $200 million.

Some U.S. states banned MTBE in gasoline. California and New York, which together accounted for 40% of U.S. MTBE consumption, banned usage of the chemical in gasoline, effective 2002 and 2004, respectively. As of 2007, 25 states had issued complete or partial bans on the use of MTBE.

The Energy Policy Act of 2005 prompted gasoline refiners to replace MTBE with ethanol.

== Notable incidents in the United States ==
=== Fallston, Maryland ===
Former location of Exxon station in Fallston, Maryland

Harford County, Maryland, found MTBE in wells near several of its filling stations beginning in 2004. This led the state of Maryland to make moves to ban MTBE.

In 2005, an Exxon-Mobil station in Fallston, Maryland, was found to be leaking MTBE into the local wells. The discovery resulted in the station being abruptly closed. Exxon-Mobil referred to the closure as a "business decision". Following the closure, MTBE levels in the area dropped.

In September 2004, Harford County placed a six-month moratorium on construction of filling stations.

=== Jacksonville, Maryland ===
In 2006, the wells of a neighborhood in Jacksonville, Maryland, were contaminated by a spill of 26,000 gallons of gasoline from an Exxon-Mobil station in the area, resulting in an ongoing court battle. The suit has been filed by the state of Maryland's Department of the Environment on behalf of the area's residents, seeking millions of dollars in damages from Exxon-Mobil. Many residents also filed their own separate lawsuits.

The case began in 2006, when a gasoline tank sprang a leak that was not detected for 34 days. Testing of 120 wells resulted in dangerously high levels of MTBE being found. Residents were put in danger by the spill, and in order to prevent further health problems, they required bottled water for cooking, drinking, and brushing teeth. Residents of Jacksonville continue to use bottled water for all activities despite having MTBE filters and alarms installed in their homes. Home values also dropped as a result of the spill.

In September 2008, Exxon-Mobil settled the case with the state by agreeing to pay a $4 million fine, and face an additional $1 million in penalties annually if they did not work to clean up the spill.

In March 2009, a jury awarded $150 million in damages to some of the area's residents. The jury did not assess any punitive damages in the case, finding that Exxon Mobil did not act fraudulently. A separate case including over 150 property owners as plaintiffs began in early 2011. Punitive damages were awarded to the second group of plaintiffs, on the basis that Exxon acted fraudulently, however this decision was later reversed.

=== Santa Monica, California ===
In 1995 high levels of MTBE were unexpectedly discovered in the water wells of Santa Monica, California, and the U.S. Geological Survey reported detections. Subsequent U.S. findings indicate tens of thousands of contaminated sites in water wells distributed across the country. As per toxicity alone, MTBE is not classified as a hazard for the environment, but it imparts an unpleasant taste to water even at very low concentrations. The maximum contaminant level of MTBE in drinking water has not yet been established by the United States Environmental Protection Agency (EPA). The leakage problem is partially attributed to the lack of effective regulations for underground storage tanks, but spillage from overfilling is also a contributor. As an ingredient in unleaded gasoline, MTBE is the most water-soluble component. When dissolved in groundwater, MTBE will lead the contaminant plume with the remaining components such as benzene and toluene following. Thus the discovery of MTBE in public groundwater wells indicates that the contaminant source was a gasoline release. Its criticism and subsequent decreased usage, some claim, is more a product of its easy detectability (taste) in extremely low concentrations (ppb) than its toxicity. The MTBE concentrations used in the EU (usually 1.0–1.6%) and allowed (maximum 5%) in Europe are lower than in California.

Chevron, BP, and other oil companies agreed to settle with Santa Monica for $423 million on May 7, 2008.

== Regulation in the United States ==
=== Restrictions on MTBE manufacturing and usage ===
In 2000, EPA drafted plans to phase out the use of MTBE nationwide over four years.. Some states enacted MTBE prohibitions without waiting for federal restrictions. California banned MTBE as a gasoline additive in 2002. The State of New York banned the use of MTBE as a "fuel additive", effective in 2004. MTBE use is still legal in the state for other industrial uses.

The federal Energy Policy Act of 2005 removed the oxygenate requirement for reformulated gasoline and established a renewable fuel standard. The lack of MTBE liability protection in the law also prompted refiners to substitute ethanol for MTBE as a gasoline additive.

=== Drinking water regulations ===
EPA issued a drinking water health advisory for MTBE, a guidance document for water utilities and the public, in 1997. The Agency first listed MTBE in 1998 as a candidate for development of a national Maximum Contaminant Level (MCL) standard in drinking water. EPA included MTBE on its most recent Contaminant Candidate List in 2022 but has not announced whether it will develop an MCL. EPA uses toxicity data in developing MCLs for public water systems.

California established a state-level MCL for MTBE in 2000.

== See also ==
- List of environmental issues
- Environmental issues in the United States
