= Tetraethyltin =

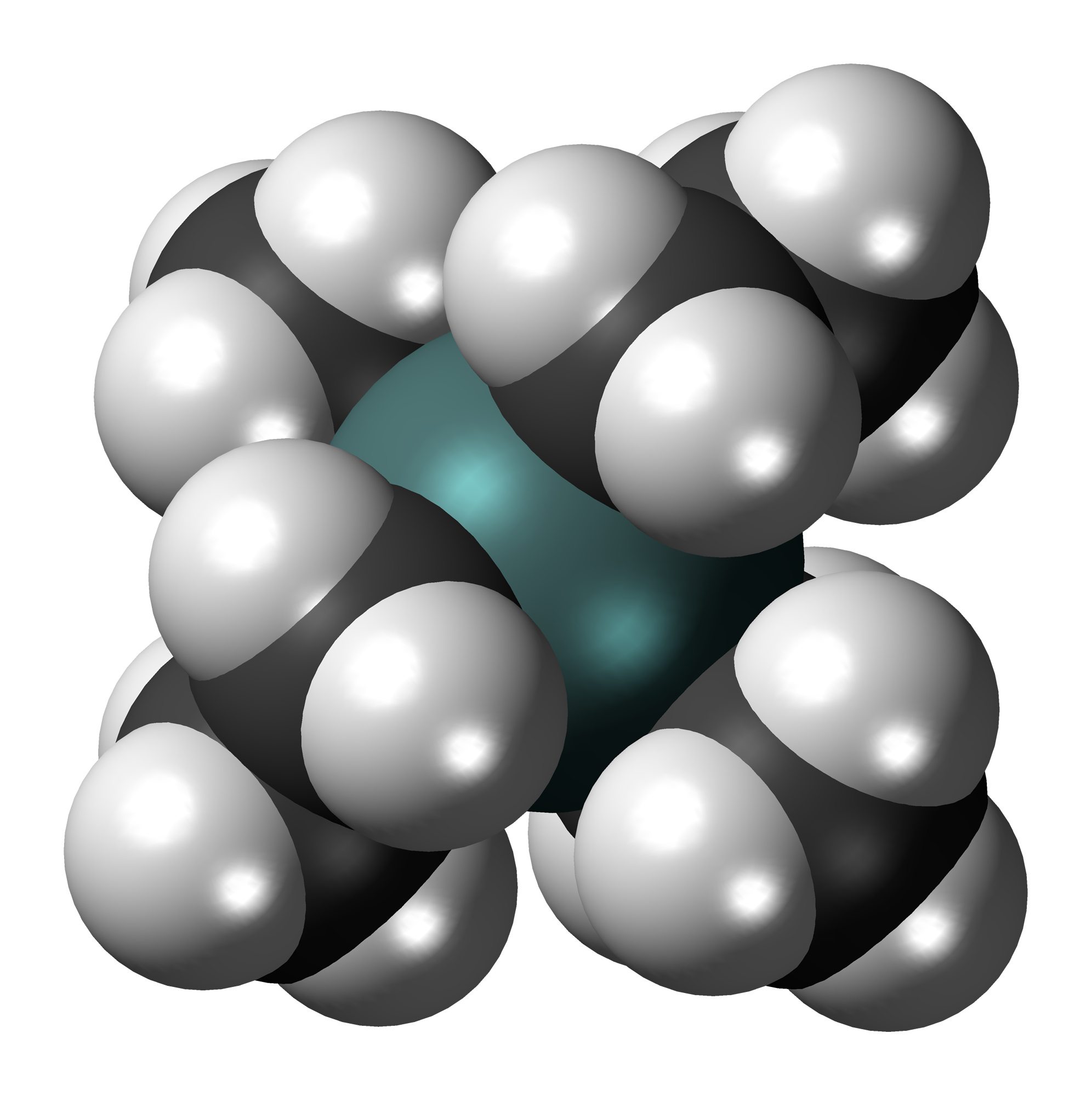

Names
- IUPAC name Tetraethyltin
- Other names Tetraethyl tin Tetraethylstannane

Identifiers
CAS Number	597-64-8
3D model (JSmol)	Interactive image
Abbreviations	TET; Et_{4}Sn
ChemSpider	11212
ECHA InfoCard	100.009.007
EC Number	209-906-2
MeSH	Tetraethyltin
PubChem CID	11704
UNII	31RE6NA75O
UN number	3384 2788
CompTox Dashboard (EPA)	DTXSID9022073
- InChI: InChI=1S/4C2H5.Sn/c4*1-2;/h4*1H2,2H3; Key: RWWNQEOPUOCKGR-UHFFFAOYSA-N
- SMILES: CC[Sn](CC)(CC)CC

Properties
Chemical formula	(CH_{3}CH_{2})_{4}Sn
Molar mass	234.958 g·mol^{−1}
Appearance	Colourless liquid
Density	1.187 g cm^{−3}
Melting point	−112 °C (−170 °F; 161 K)
Boiling point	181 °C (358 °F; 454 K)

Hazards
- GHS labelling
Pictograms	(GHS02: Flammable) (GHS06: Toxic) (GHS09: Environmental hazard)
Signal word	Danger
Hazard statements	H226, H300, H310, H330, H410
Precautionary statements	P210, P233, P240, P241, P242, P243, P260, P262, P264, P270, P271, P273, P280, P284, P301+P310, P302+P350, P303+P361+P353, P304+P340, P310, P320, P321, P330, P361, P363, P370+P378, P391, P403+P233, P403+P235, P405, P501
NFPA 704 (fire diamond)	3 2 3
Flash point	53 °C (127 °F; 326 K)

Related compounds
Related Tetraalkylstannanes	Tetramethyltin; Tetrapropyltin; Tetrabutyltin
Related compounds	Tetraethylmethane; Tetraethylsilane; Tetraethylgermanium; Tetraethyllead
- Except where otherwise noted, data are given for materials in their standard state (at 25 °C [77 °F], 100 kPa). verify (what is ?) Infobox references

Tetraethyltin or tetraethyl tin is a chemical compound with the formula (CH_{3}CH_{2})_{4}Sn, that is, a tin atom attached to four ethyl groups. This organotin compound, often abbreviated as TET. It is a colourless flammable liquid, soluble in organic solvents and insoluble in water. It is used in the electronics industry.

Tetraethyltin can be obtained by treating ethylmagnesium bromide with tin(IV) chloride:

SnCl_{4} + 4 CH_{3}CH_{2}MgBr → (CH_{3}CH_{2})_{4}Sn + 4 MgBrCl

The same approach can be used to obtain other tetraorganyl tin compounds, such as tetra-n-butyltin.

Tetraethyltin is converted in the body to the more toxic triethylstannylium derivatives .

== See also ==
- Tetraethylmethane
- Tetraethylsilane
- Tetraethylgermane
- Tetraethylplumbane
