= Tetraethylgermanium =

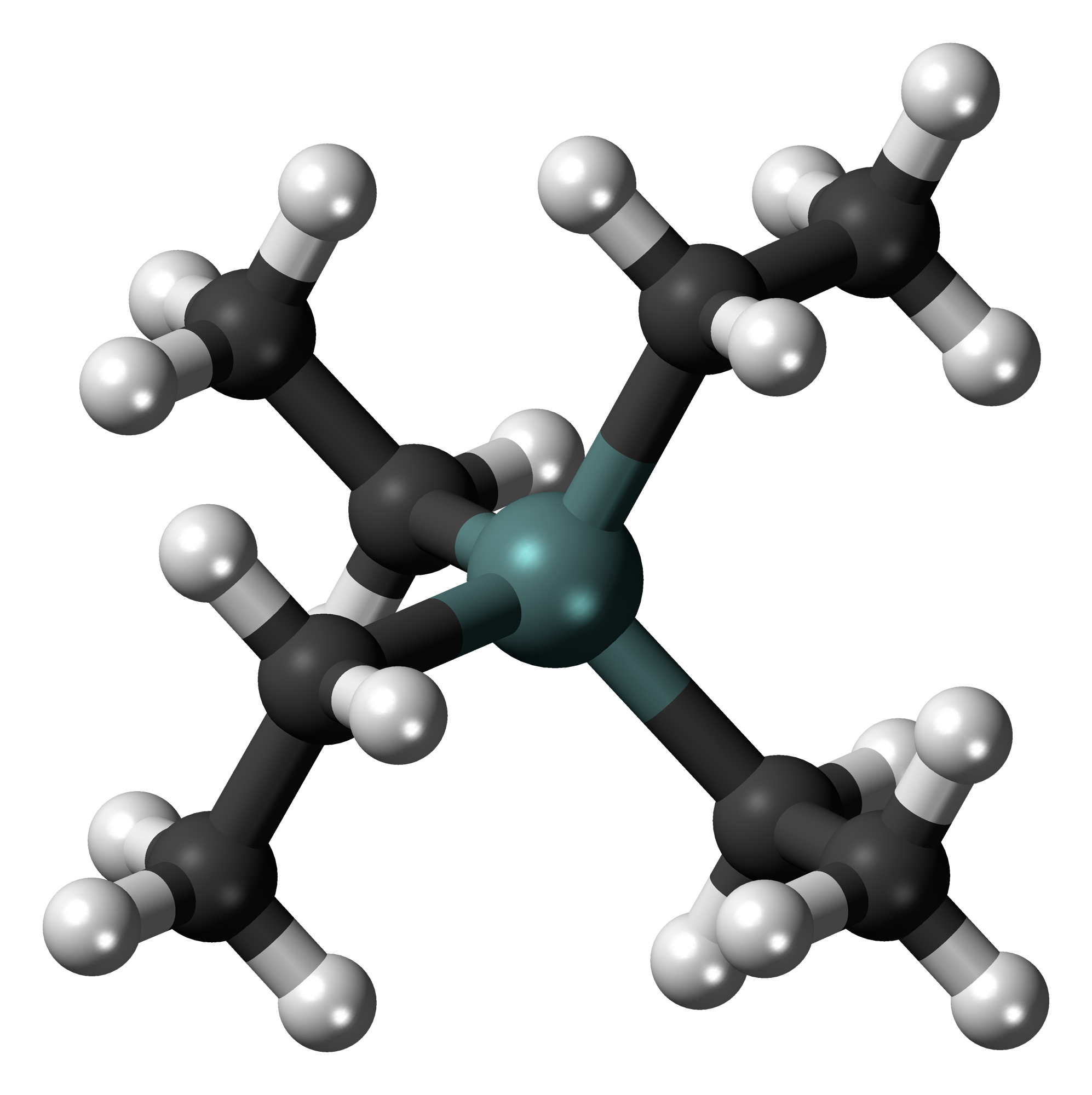

Names
- Preferred IUPAC name Tetraethylgermane

Identifiers
CAS Number	597-63-7
3D model (JSmol)	Interactive image
Abbreviations	TEG; Et_{4}Ge
ChemSpider	11211
ECHA InfoCard	100.009.006
EC Number	209-905-7
PubChem CID	11703
RTECS number	LY5290000
UN number	1993
CompTox Dashboard (EPA)	DTXSID9060499
- InChI: InChI=1S/C8H20Ge/c1-5-9(6-2,7-3)8-4/h5-8H2,1-4H3 Key: QQXSEZVCKAEYQJ-UHFFFAOYSA-N; InChI=1/C8H20Ge/c1-5-9(6-2,7-3)8-4/h5-8H2,1-4H3 Key: QQXSEZVCKAEYQJ-UHFFFAOYAH
- SMILES: CC[Ge](CC)(CC)CC

Properties
Chemical formula	C_{8}H_{20}Ge
Molar mass	188.878 g·mol^{−1}
Appearance	Colourless liquid
Density	0.998 g cm^{−3}
Boiling point	163 to 165 °C (325 to 329 °F; 436 to 438 K)

Hazards
- GHS labelling
Pictograms	(GHS02: Flammable) (GHS07: Exclamation mark)
Signal word	Warning
Hazard statements	H226, H302, H315, H319, H335
Precautionary statements	P210, P233, P240, P241, P242, P243, P261, P264, P270, P271, P280, P301+P312, P302+P352, P303+P361+P353, P304+P340, P305+P351+P338, P312, P321, P330, P332+P313, P337+P313, P362, P370+P378, P403+P233, P403+P235, P405, P501
NFPA 704 (fire diamond)	2 3 2
Flash point	35 °C (95 °F; 308 K)

Related compounds
Related compounds	Tetraethylmethane; Tetraethylsilane; Tetraethyltin; Tetraethyllead; Tetramethylgermanium
- Except where otherwise noted, data are given for materials in their standard state (at 25 °C [77 °F], 100 kPa). verify (what is ?) Infobox references

Tetraethylgermanium (IUPAC name: tetraethylgermane), abbreviated TEG, is an organogermanium compound with the formula (CH_{3}CH_{2})_{4}Ge. Tetraethylgermanium is an important chemical compound used in vapour deposition of germanium which is in a tetrahedral shape.

== Synthesis ==
Clemens Winkler first reported the compound in 1887 from diethylzinc and germanium tetrachloride, shortly after germanium was discovered in 1887.

GeCl_{4} + 2 Zn(CH_{2}CH_{3})_{2} → Ge(CH_{2}CH_{3})_{4} + 2 ZnCl_{2}
