= Tetraethylsilane =

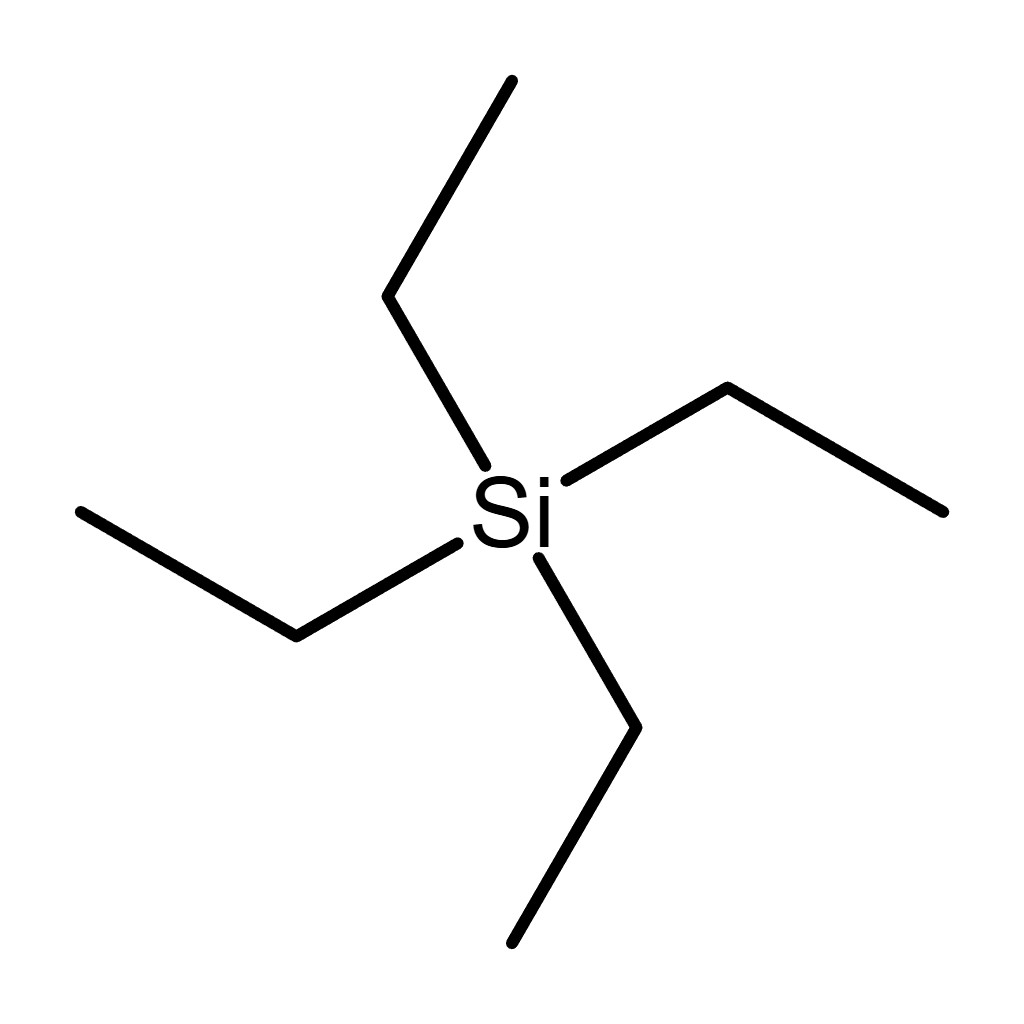

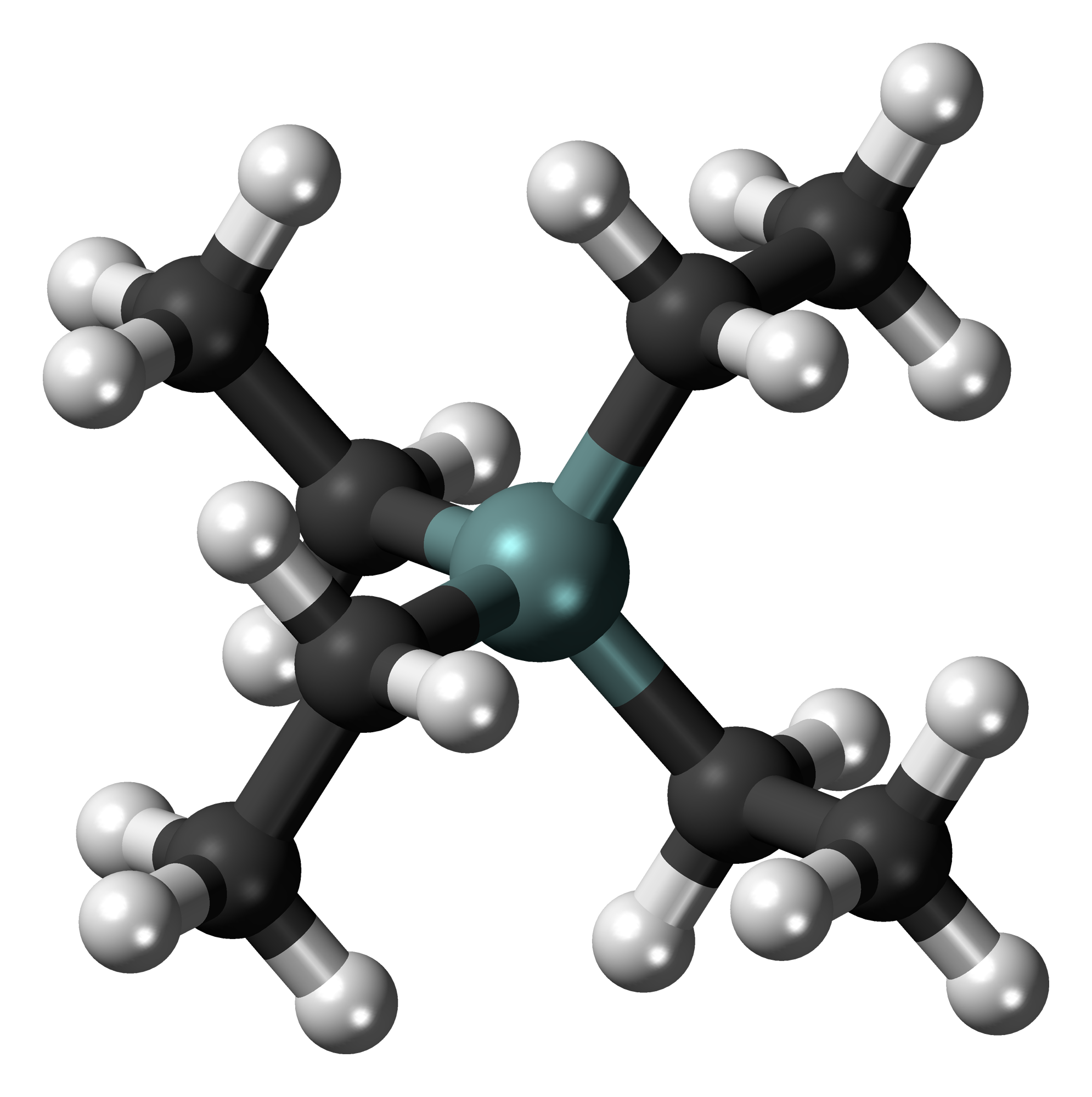

Names
- IUPAC name Tetraethylsilane
- Other names: Tetraethylsilicon

Identifiers
CAS Number	631-36-7
3D model (JSmol)	Interactive image
Abbreviations	Et_{4}Si
ChemSpider	11919
ECHA InfoCard	100.010.142
EC Number	211-155-0
PubChem CID	12426
CompTox Dashboard (EPA)	DTXSID1060891
- InChI: InChI=1S/C8H20Si/c1-5-9(6-2,7-3)8-4/h5-8H2,1-4H3 Key: VCZQFJFZMMALHB-UHFFFAOYSA-N
- SMILES: CC[Si](CC)(CC)CC

Properties
Chemical formula	Si(CH_{2}CH_{3})_{4}
Molar mass	144.333 g·mol^{−1}
Appearance	Colorless liquid
Odor	Distinct, mild
Density	0.761 g/cm^{3}
Melting point	−82.5 °C (−116.5 °F; 190.7 K)
Boiling point	153–154 °C (307–309 °F; 426–427 K)
Solubility in water	Almost insoluble in water
Vapor pressure	5 mmHg at 20 °C (68 °F)
Refractive index (n_{D})	1.426

Structure
Molecular shape	Tetrahedral at Si

Hazards
- Occupational safety and health (OHS/OSH)
Main hazards	Flammable
- GHS labelling
Pictograms	(GHS02: Flammable) (GHS07: Exclamation mark)
Signal word	Warning
Hazard statements	H226, H315, H319, H335
Precautionary statements	P210, P233, P240, P241, P242, P243, P261, P264, P264+P265, P271, P280, P302+P352, P303+P361+P353, P304+P340, P305+P351+P338, P319, P321, P332+P317, P337+P317, P362+P364, P370+P378, P403+P233, P403+P235, P405, P501
Flash point	25 °C
Autoignition temperature	235 °C (455 °F; 508 K)

Related compounds
Related compounds	Tetraethylmethane; Tetraethylgermanium; Tetraethyltin; Tetraethyllead
- Except where otherwise noted, data are given for materials in their standard state (at 25 °C [77 °F], 100 kPa). Infobox references

Tetraethylsilane is an organosilicon compound with the chemical formula Si(CH_{2}CH_{3})_{4}. It is a colorless liquid. Under standard conditions, it does not react with water, air, nitric acid or concentrated potassium hydroxide. Its vapor density is 4.98, relative to air (air = 1).

== Synthesis ==
The synthesis of tetraethylsilane by reacting silicon tetrachloride with diethylmercury or diethylzinc in an ampoule at 140–160 °C (284–320 °F) was first reported in 1863 by Charles Friedel and James Mason Crafts.

SiCl_{4} + 2 Zn(CH_{2}CH_{3})_{2} → Si(CH_{2}CH_{3})_{4} + 2 ZnCl_{2}

== Uses ==
Tetraethylsilane reacts with halides of the boron group elements, such as boron tribromide or gallium trichloride with high yield and purity to form the corresponding dihaloethyl compound.

Si(CH_{2}CH_{3})_{4} + BBr_{3} → (CH_{3}CH_{2})_{3}SiBr + CH_{3}CH_{2}BBr_{2}
Si(CH_{2}CH_{3})_{4} + GaCl_{3} → (CH_{3}CH_{2})_{3}SiCl + CH_{3}CH_{2}GaCl_{2}
