= Mirosław Jan Stasik =

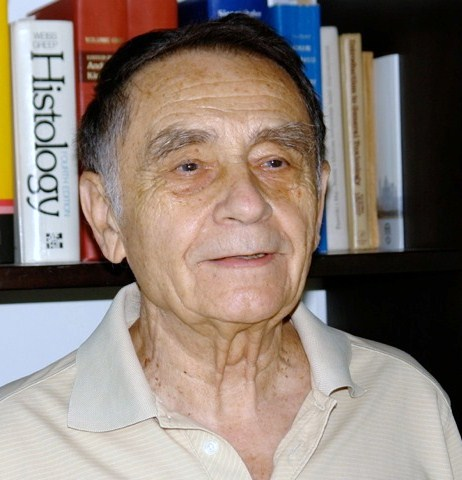
Mirosław Jan Stasik

Mirosław Jan Stasik (born 27 January 1929 in Łódź, died 8 August 2023 in Niedernhausen) was a Polish medical doctor and research toxicologist.

== Education and early career ==
Stasik graduated from Łódź School of Medicine (now Medical University of Łódź) and later studied toxicology at the University of Surrey, United Kingdom. He obtained his Dr Med. at the Heidelberg University, Germany's oldest university.

In the 1960s he completed his training in internal medicine, and became director of the newly created clinical department of acute poisoning at the Nofer Institute of Occupational Medicine in Łódz. There he also pioneered in the field of poison control centers in Poland.

During this period he published one of the first clinical works devoted to acute toxicity of tetraethyllead in humans. This substance was commonly used as an antiknock agent in gasoline until 2005.

== Further career ==
Since 1970 he has been living in Germany, with two breaks for training at the Institute of Toxicology of the University of Würzburg and for university study in the UK.

In Frankfurt he directed a centre of toxicology and epidemiology within the department of occupational medicine of a chemical concern Hoechst AG.

His research was focused on defining the carcinogenic potential of some aromatic amines, e.g. 3,3'-dichlorobenzidine and derivatives of aniline, as well as ethylene oxide and formaldehyde.

In the 1980s Stasik represented Hoechst at scientific conferences of the Chemical Industry Institute of Toxicology (USA), as well as symposiums of the Center for Environmental Epidemiology, University of Pittsburgh. These were organized in co-operation with the United States Environmental Protection Agency.

He was also a member of the Ecology and Toxicology Centre and the European Chemical Industry Council (CEFIC) in Brussels.

In recent years he co-operated with the Institute of Social, Occupational and Environmental Medicine at the Gutenberg University, as well as with the Department of Histology and Embryology of the Medical University of Łódź in order to continue and to publish his works on carcinogenic aromatic amines.

== Main achievements ==
In Frankfurt, while investigating simple arylamines, Stasik discovered that 4-chloro-o-toluidine (4-COT), used as an intermediate for the manufacture of dyestuffs, pigments, and chlordimeform a pesticide, causes cancer of the urinary bladder in humans. As a direct consequence of this discovery a worldwide ban was imposed on production and use of this arylamine.

Professor Klaus Norpoth in his handbook of occupational medicine mentions Mirosław Stasik for the discovery of the cancer risk of 4-COT as one of 15 international researchers, who over two centuries discovered occupational carcinogenic substances, starting from Percivall Pott (1775), through Ludwig Rehn (1895), John Creech and Maurice Johnson (1974) to Stasik (1987).

Stasik is an author and co-author of several dozen publications in international journals, articles in International Labour Office Encyclopedia of Occupational Health and Safety (four editions) and in Ullmann's Enzyklopaedie.

Since 1997 he has been leading a branch of Societas Jablonoviana in Wiesbaden. This scientific society was founded in Leipzig in 1774 by a Polish aristocrat Józef A. Jabłonowski.

== 4-COT Foundation ==
In 2001, together with his wife Dr Liliana Stasik, he set up the 4-COT Foundation, which sponsors studies of young Polish researchers in Western Europe and Canada.
