= Derek Bryce-Smith =

- Born: 26 April 1926
- Died: 24 June 2011 (aged 85)

Derek Bryce-Smith (1926–2011) was an English chemist and professor of Organic Chemistry at the University of Reading from 1956 until his retirement in 1991. His work included organometallic chemistry, radical chemistry, photochemistry, environmental science, nutritional science and behavioural science. He was among the first to describe the dangers of tetraethyl lead, which was used for several decades as an anti-knock additive in petrol. Initially, his concerns were dismissed both by his fellow academics and by industrial interests. However, by the time of his death, only six countries had not outlawed leaded petrol, and the Royal Society of Chemistry gave him a silver medal in 1984 for his work in this area. He subsequently became convinced that the use of NPK fertilisers in agriculture resulted in a lack of the essential trace element, zinc in modern (particularly vegetarian) diets; his pioneering views were again widely dismissed, becoming mainstream years later. An account of both campaigns is given in a book he co-authored with Liz Hodgkinson.
