= Antiknock agent =

Agent used to increase a fuel's octane rating

An antiknock agent (or knock inhibitor) is a gasoline additive used to reduce engine knocking and increase the fuel's octane rating by raising the temperature and pressure at which auto-ignition occurs. The mixture known as gasoline or petrol, when used in high compression internal combustion engines, has a tendency to knock (also called "pinging" or "pinking") and/or to ignite early before the correctly timed spark occurs (pre-ignition, refer to engine knocking).

Notable early antiknock agents, especially tetraethyllead, added to gasoline included large amounts of toxic lead. The chemical was responsible for global negative impacts on health, and the phase out of leaded gasoline from the 1970s onward was reported by the United Nations Environmental Programme to be responsible for "$2.4 trillion in annual benefits, 1.2 million fewer premature deaths, higher overall intelligence and 58 million fewer crimes". Some other chemicals used as gasoline additives are thought to be less toxic.

In Europe, after the earlier ban of lead antiknock additives, an effective ban of other metal-contained additives (MFA, metallic fuel additives) was established in 2004 with a specific limit for methylcyclopentadienyl manganese tricarbonyl (MMT) of 6 mg/l from 2011, lowered to 2 mg/l in 2014. In recent years no use of MMT has been reported in the annual monitoring reports under the European fuel quality directive. By the end of the 1990s, North American refineries also voluntary stopped the use of MMT in petrol, since less contested antiknock additives and compounds, such as MTBE and ethanol, were available.

== Research ==
Early research was led by A. H. Gibson and Harry Ricardo in England and Thomas Midgley Jr. and Thomas Boyd in the United States. The discovery that lead additives modified this behavior led to the widespread adoption of the practice in the 1920s and therefore more powerful higher compression engines. The most popular additive was tetraethyllead. However, with the discovery of the environmental and health damage caused by the lead, attributed to Derek Bryce-Smith and Clair Cameron Patterson, and the incompatibility of lead with catalytic converters found on virtually all US automobiles since 1975, this practice began to wane in the 1980s. Most countries are phasing out leaded fuel although different additives still contain lead compounds. Other additives include aromatic hydrocarbons, ethers and alcohol (usually ethanol or methanol).

== Typical agents ==
Typical agents that have been used for their antiknock properties are:

- Tetraethyllead (still in use as a high octane additive)
- MTBE
- Ethanol
- Methylcyclopentadienyl manganese tricarbonyl (MMT)
- Ferrocene
- Iron pentacarbonyl
- Toluene
- Isooctane
- BTEX - a hydrocarbon mixture of benzene, toluene, xylene and ethyl-benzene, also called gasoline aromatics
- Xylidine - any of a number of isomeric amines of xylene.

=== Tetraethyllead ===
In the U.S., where tetraethyllead had been blended with gasoline (primarily to boost octane levels) since the early 1920s, standards to phase out leaded gasoline were first implemented in 1973. In 1995, leaded fuel accounted for only 0.6% of total gasoline sales and less than 2,000 tons of lead per year. From January 1, 1996, the Clean Air Act banned the sale of leaded fuel for use in on-road vehicles in the United States. Possession and use of leaded gasoline in a regular on-road vehicle now carries a maximum US$10,000 fine in the United States. However, fuel containing lead may continue to be sold for off-road uses, including aircraft, racing cars, farm equipment, and marine engines. The ban on leaded gasoline led to thousands fewer tons of lead being released into the air by automobiles.

Similar bans in other countries have resulted in sharply decreasing levels of lead in people's bloodstreams.

A side effect of the lead additives was protection of the valve seats from erosion. Many classic cars' engines have needed modification to use lead-free fuels since leaded fuels became unavailable. However, "lead substitute" products are also produced and can sometimes be found at auto parts stores.

Gasoline, as delivered at the pump, also contains additives to reduce internal engine carbon buildups, improve combustion, and to allow easier starting in cold climates.

In some parts of South America, Asia, and the Middle East, leaded gasoline is still in use. Leaded gasoline was phased out in sub-Saharan Africa, starting 1 January 2006. A growing number of countries have drawn up plans to ban leaded gasoline in the near future.

Some experts speculate that leaded petrol was behind a global crime wave in the late 1980s and early 1990s.

To avoid deposits of lead inside the engine, lead scavengers are added to the gasoline together with tetraethyllead. The most common ones are:

- Tricresyl phosphate
- 1,2-Dibromoethane
- 1,2-Dichloroethane

=== MTBE ===
As tetraethyllead use declined, industry had to decide how to make up the octane deficit between the principal marketable light fuels produced by their refineries, and the higher octane fuels needed for high-compression gasoline engines in the automobile fleet. Around 70% of the difference was accommodated by more advanced processes at the refinery stage, cracking other hydrocarbon products from the distillation stack to modify them into fuels that would blend gasoline closer the appropriate octane. Most of the rest of the octane deficit required chemical additives not derived from the refinery process. Tetraethyl lead was largely replaced in the US with methyl tert-butyl ether starting in 1979. MTBE is a toxic water pollutant, and a series of groundwater contamination scandals starting in the 90's prompted the EPA to begin phasing MTBE out in 2000.

=== Ethanol ===
MTBE's water pollution issues prompted plans for a phaseout, starting in 2000 with an EPA draft proposal, which was addressed several times at the state level in the years to follow, and eventually cemented in place federally with a 9-year phaseout in 2005's Energy Policy Act, with significant proportions of fuel ethanol designated as the replacement antiknock agent for the US automotive fuel system. Congress' attempts to promote ethanol for its geopolitical use as a backstop on any attempts to limit the US' gasoline supply, and also its incentives to reward Iowan corn farmers, whose state political primaries hold a special place in the electoral system, escalated ethanol from an additive to be used as needed, then to a fixed blending proportion of 5%, and then 10%, which is today the most common US fuel blend.

Ethanol has several issues as an antiknock additive. It is hydrophilic, pulling water vapor out of moist air, and it also increases the level of free oxygen in the fuel significantly. Both of these cause significant degradation to traditionally constructed engines, posing both residue and corrosion issues in increasing proportion with increasing fractions of ethanol. Whereas age-degraded gasoline may simply polymerize, evaporate, and thus lose its flammability, age-degraded gasoline-ethanol blends can cause severe damage if allowed to sit in an engine. Automotive engines addressed this with the mandated shift over to ethanol-tolerant metals and seals, and with the use of smart electronic fuel injection, which has some flexibility to adjust combustion properties and timing. Automotive engines did not see major issues because of these factors, and because automobiles in active use typically cycle through their gas tank in a matter of weeks. In small carburetor engines, like generators and lawnmowers, ethanol damage became the dominant mode of failure.

=== MMT ===
Methylcyclopentadienyl manganese tricarbonyl (MMT) has been used for many years in Canada and recently in Australia to boost octane ratings. It also allows old cars, designed to use leaded fuel, to run on unleaded fuel without the need for additives to prevent valve seat erosion.

A large Canadian study from 2002 (funded by automakers, who are against its use) concluded that MMT impairs the effectiveness of automobile emission controls and increases pollution from motor vehicles. However, a later study by the Canadian government found that "no Notice of Defect was found to be potentially caused by MMT."

Many studies have been undertaken over time that confirmed the use of MMT is compatible with vehicles and safe for human health and the environment. In particular, a 2013 risk assessment on MMT was undertaken by ARCADIS Consulting, following a methodology developed by the European Commission. This risk assessment was verified by an independent panel and found by the EU Commission to be compliant with their methodology. It concluded that "when MMT is used as a fuel additive in petrol, no significant human health or environmental concerns related to exposure to either MMT or its transformation [combustion] products (manganese phosphate, manganese sulphate and manganese tetroxide) were identified even in locations where MMT is approved for use at levels up to 18 mg Mn/L."

As stated by Health Canada in their risk assessment on the widespread use of MMT in Canadian gasoline, "all analyses indicate that the combustion products of MMT in gasoline do not represent an added health risk to the Canadian population"

MMT is manufactured by reduction of bis(methylcyclopentadienyl) manganese using triethylaluminium. The reduction is conducted under an atmosphere of carbon monoxide. MMT is a so-called half-sandwich compound, or more specifically a piano-stool complex (since the three CO ligands are like the legs of a piano stool). The manganese atom in MMT is coordinated with three carbonyl groups as well as to the methylcyclopentadienyl ring. These hydrophobic organic ligands make MMT highly lipophilic, which may increase bioaccumulation. While the structure of MMT suggests lipophilicity and potential to bioaccumulate, comparison of bioconcentration factors (BCF) reported for plant and animal species in comparison to regulatory-based cutoffs (i.e., US EPA and EU REACH) indicates a low bioaccumulative potential of MMT. Figures 2 and 3 of the study (pages 182 & 184) shows the BCF plotted against time and illustrates the potential BCF of MMT. From these figures, the upper curve (A) demonstrates the 9-day MMT BCF plateauing at approximately 400 in plants and 200 in fish, with both values well below the Bioaccumulative / Very Bioaccumulative (B/vB) thresholds of US EPA, EU REACH and Environment & Climate Change Canada.

A variety of related complexes are known, including ferrocene, which is also under consideration as an additive to gasoline.

=== Ferrocene ===
Ferrocene is the organometallic compound with the formula Fe(C_{5}H_{5})_{2}. It is the prototypical metallocene, a type of organometallic chemical compound consisting of two cyclopentadienyl rings bound on opposite sides of a central metal atom. Such organometallic compounds are also known as sandwich compounds. The rapid growth of organometallic chemistry is often attributed to the excitement arising from the discovery of ferrocene and its many analogues.

Ferrocene and its numerous derivatives have no large-scale applications, but have many niche uses that exploit their unusual structure (ligand scaffolds, pharmaceutical candidates), robustness (anti-knock formulations, precursors to materials), and redox reactions (reagents and redox standards). Use for global cooling has been proposed.

Ferrocene and its derivatives are antiknock agents added to the petrol used in motor vehicles, and are safer than the now-banned tetraethyllead. Petrol additive solutions containing ferrocene can be added to unleaded petrol to enable its use in vintage cars designed to run on leaded petrol. The iron-containing deposits formed from ferrocene can form a conductive coating on the spark plug surfaces.

=== Iron pentacarbonyl ===
Iron pentacarbonyl, also known as iron carbonyl, is the compound with formula Fe(CO)_{5}. Under standard conditions Fe(CO)_{5} is a free-flowing, straw-colored liquid with a pungent odour.

This compound is a common precursor to diverse iron compounds, including many that are useful in organic synthesis. Fe(CO)_{5} is prepared by the reaction of fine iron particles with carbon monoxide. Fe(CO)_{5} is inexpensively purchased.

Iron pentacarbonyl is one of the homoleptic metal carbonyls; i.e. metal complexes bonded only to CO ligands. Other examples include octahedral Cr(CO)_{6} and tetrahedral Ni(CO)_{4}.

Most metal carbonyls have 18 valence electrons, and Fe(CO)_{5} fits this pattern with 8 valence electrons on Fe and five pairs of electrons provided by the CO ligands. Reflecting its symmetrical structure and charge neutrality, Fe(CO)_{5} is volatile; it is one of the most frequently encountered liquid metal complexes.

Fe(CO)_{5} adopts a trigonal bipyramidal structure with the Fe atom surrounded by five CO ligands: three in equatorial positions and two axially bound. The Fe-C-O linkages are each linear.

Fe(CO)_{5} is the archetypal fluxional molecule due to the rapid interchange of the axial and equatorial CO groups via the Berry mechanism on the NMR timescale. Consequently, the^{13}C NMR spectrum exhibits only one signal due to the rapid interchange between nonequivalent CO sites.

In Europe, iron pentacarbonyl was once used as an anti-knock agent in petrol in place of tetraethyllead. Two more modern alternative fuel additives are ferrocene and methylcyclopentadienyl manganese tricarbonyl. Fe(CO)_{5} is used in the production of "carbonyl iron", a finely divided form of iron used in magnetic cores of high-frequency coils for electronics, and for manufacture of the active ingredients of some radar absorbent materials (e.g. iron ball paint). It is famous as a chemical precursor for the synthesis of various iron-based nanoparticles.

Iron pentacarbonyl has been found to be a strong flame speed inhibitor in oxygen based flames.

=== Toluene ===
Toluene is a clear, water-insoluble liquid with a slightly sweet, highly volatile odor reminiscent of paint thinners or other organic solvents. It is an aromatic hydrocarbon that is widely used as an industrial feedstock and as a solvent. Like other solvents, toluene is also used as an inhalant drug for its intoxicating properties.

Toluene and benzene were used as octane rating boosters for aviation fuel by the Royal Air Force in the World War Two. Tetraethyl lead was manufactured in the USA and was on short supply, so Rolls-Royce engineers built the Rolls-Royce Merlin to work with fuel affed with benzene and toluene. This was called as "aromatic fuel". The Allison V-1710 engine would not run with the RAF fuels as it required tetraethyl lead for lubrication of its valvetrain, but the Packard-built Merlins would. This is why the Merlin-engine P-51 Mustangs had a text "Suitable for Aromatics" on their USAAF type description.

Toluene can be used as an octane booster in gasoline fuels used in internal combustion engines. Toluene at 86% by volume fueled all the turbo Formula 1 teams in the 1980s, first pioneered by the Honda team. The remaining 14% was a "filler" of n-heptane, to reduce the octane to meet Formula 1 fuel restrictions. Toluene at 100% can be used as a fuel for both two-stroke and four-stroke engines; however, due to the density of the fuel and other factors, the fuel does not vaporize easily unless preheated to 70 degrees Celsius (Honda accomplished this in their Formula 1 cars by routing the fuel lines through the exhaust system to heat the fuel). Toluene also poses similar problems as alcohol fuels, as it eats through standard rubber fuel lines and has no lubricating properties as standard gasoline does, which can break down fuel pumps and cause upper cylinder bore wear.

Toluene has also been used as a coolant for its good heat transfer capabilities in sodium cold traps used in nuclear reactor system loops.

Properties of xylenes and ethylbenzene are nearly identical to toluene, with the latter advertised by a refinery as "component of high performance fuels".

=== 2,2,4-Trimethylpentane (isooctane) ===
2,2,4-Trimethylpentane, also known as isooctane, is an octane isomer which defines the 100 point on the octane rating scale (the zero point is n-heptane). It is an important component of gasoline.

Isooctane is produced on a massive scale in the petroleum industry, usually as a mixture with related hydrocarbons. The alkylation process alkylates isobutane with isobutylene using a strong acid catalyst. In the NExOCTANE process, isobutylene is dimerized into isooctene and then hydrogenated to isooctane.

=== Xylidine ===
In World War II, xylidine was an important antiknock agent in very high performance aviation gasolines. Its purpose was to permit high levels of boost pressure in multiple-stage turbochargers, and thus high power at high altitudes, without causing detonation that would destroy the engine. The high pressures brought high temperatures of inlet air, making engines prone to knock. This use and storage stabilization methods were important military secrets.

== See also ==
- MTBE controversy
