= Dipropyltin dichloride =

Organotin compound

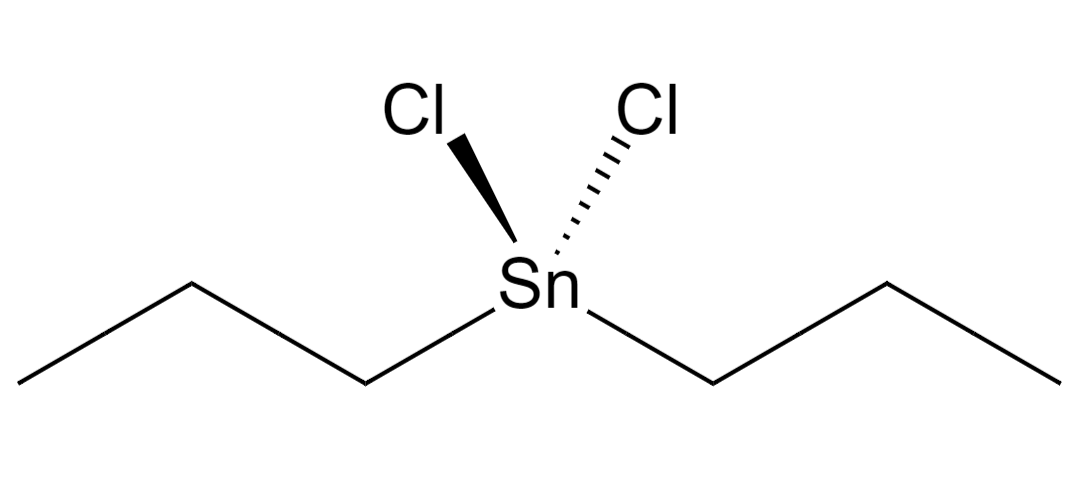

Names
- IUPAC name Dipropyltin dichloride
- Systematic IUPAC name Dichloro(dipropyl)stannane
- Other names: Dichlorodipropylstannane; Dichlorodipropyltin; Di-n-propyltin dichloride; Stannane, dichlorodipropyl-

Identifiers
CAS Number	867-36-7
3D model (JSmol)	Interactive image
ChemSpider	84462
ECHA InfoCard	100.225.824
EC Number	696-456-9
PubChem CID	93562
RTECS number	WH7255000
UNII	714O4P8M1O
UN number	UN3146
CompTox Dashboard (EPA)	DTXSID20235776
- InChI: InChI=1S/2C3H7.2ClH.Sn/c2*1-3-2;;;/h2*1,3H2,2H3;2*1H;/q;;;;+2/p-2 Key: CTRHCENQKGMZLE-UHFFFAOYSA-L
- SMILES: CCC[Sn](CCC)(Cl)Cl

Properties
Chemical formula	(CH_{3}CH_{2}CH_{2})_{2}SnCl_{2}
Molar mass	275.79 g·mol^{−1}
Appearance	White solid
Melting point	82–84 °C (180–183 °F; 355–357 K)
Solubility	Chloroform (sparingly); Ethyl acetate (Slightly); Methanol (Slightly)

Structure
Coordination geometry	Tetrahedral at Sn atom

Hazards
- Occupational safety and health (OHS/OSH)
Main hazards	Toxic
- GHS labelling
Pictograms	(GHS06: Toxic) (GHS07: Exclamation mark) (GHS08: Health hazard) (GHS09: Environmental hazard)
Signal word	Danger
Hazard statements	H301, H302, H311, H312, H315, H319, H330, H332, H335, H410
Precautionary statements	P260, P264, P270, P271, P273, P280, P284, P301+P316, P302+P352, P304+P340, P305+P351+P338, P312, P316, P320, P321, P330, P361+P364, P391, P403+P233, P405, P501
- Except where otherwise noted, data are given for materials in their standard state (at 25 °C [77 °F], 100 kPa). Infobox references

Dipropyltin dichloride is an organotin compound with the chemical formula (CH_{3}CH_{2}CH_{2})_{2}SnCl_{2}. It is a white solid. This chemical belongs to a subclass of organotin compounds called diorganotin dihalides (R_{2}SnX_{2}, where R is organyl and X is a halogen).

== Uses ==
Dipropyltin dichloride has broad applications in industry and laboratory. It can be used as a polyvinyl chloride stabilizer, fungicide and insecticide.

== Hazards and toxicity ==
Dipropyltin dichloride can be absorbed through skin, causing intoxication. It irritates skin, eyes and respiratory system. It is toxic if swallowed. It is suspected this chemical is a human mutagen and teratogen, and toxic to the reproductive system.

Dipropyltin dichloride may react violently with strong oxidizing agents. Upon catching fire, irritating and toxic fumes, gases and smokes are released, like carbon monoxide (CO), carbon dioxide (CO_{2}), tin(II) oxide (SnO), tin(IV) oxide (SnO_{2}) and hydrogen chloride (HCl).
