= Innospec =

Specialty chemical company

Innospec Inc.
- Type: Public
- Traded as: Nasdaq: IOSP; S&P 600 Component
- Industry: Oil and gas
- Founded: 1999; 27 years ago
- Headquarters: United States
- Products: Specialty chemicals
- Revenue: ▼US$1.78 billion (2025)
- Net income: ▲US$117 million (2025)
- Number of employees: 2,000
- Website: innospecinc.com

Innospec Inc., formerly known as Octel Corporation and Associated Octel Company, Ltd., is an American specialty chemical company. It comprises three business units:

- The Performance Chemicals business trades in the personal care, home care, agrochemical, mining and industrial markets.
- The Fuel Specialties business specializes in manufacturing and supplying fuel additives.
- The Oilfield Services business supplies drilling, completion and production chemicals.

The Octane Additives business ceased trading in 2020, and the manufacture of tetraethyllead (TEL) used in the manufacture of 100LL avgas was transferred to the Fuel Specialities segment. The company has ceased the sales of TEL for use in motor gasoline, which was previously sold from the UK to Algeria.

== Locations ==
Innospec is headquartered in Englewood, Colorado, and has major regional centers in the United Kingdom and Singapore, along with international offices and processing facilities.

Production plants are located in multiple countries including UK, France, Germany, Philippines, the United States, Italy and Spain.

The company has around 2,000 employees located in 20 countries.

== Acquisitions and divestments ==
Innospec has made the following recent acquisitions and divestments:

- Strata Control was acquired in December 2013 in Oilfield Drilling Specialties.
- Chemsil Silicones and Chemtec were acquired in September 2013 in Personal Care.
- Bachman Services was acquired in November 2013 in Oilfield Production Specialties.
- Independence Oilfield Chemicals was acquired in November 2014 in Oilfield Chemicals.
- Innospec divested its Aroma Chemicals business to Emerald Kalama in July 2015.
- As of January 1, 2016; Bachman, Strata and Independence Oilfield Chemicals have been reorganized into one company, Innospec Oilfield Specialties.
- On January 3, 2017, Innospec announced it had completed the acquisition of the European Differentiated Surfactants business from Huntsman

== Products ==
Innospec markets detergents, cold flow improvers, lubricity improvers, corrosion inhibitors, antioxidants, cetane improvers, TEL, and a range of other chemicals as fuel additives.

The Oilfield Services division provides products and services for drilling, fracturing & stimulation and production operations to the oil and gas industry

In Personal Care, the company makes a range of surfactants, emollients and silicone formulations.

== Criminal activities ==
In 2007 US authorities alerted the UK SFO to Innospec's activities which had come to their attention via a UN committee and a complaint filed with SEC involving their Iraqi agents and former company executives.

On March 10, 2010, Innospec pled guilty in the U.S. to a 12-count indictment for defrauding the United Nations using kickbacks under the UN Oil for Food Program (OFFP) and making bribe payments to officials in Iraqi Oil Ministry. In addition, the company further admitted to violating the U.S. embargo against Cuba, by previously selling chemicals to Cuban industrial plants. In a 2010 investigation by The Guardian and Guardian Films, published in June, Innospec, while trading as company Octel, was revealed to have been bribing officials in Iraq and Indonesia with millions of dollars in order to continue using TEL as a fuel additive. TEL causes brain damage in children through elevated lead levels. The investigations resulted in the convictions of four executives, three of whom were sentenced to prison. The company negotiated a global settlement, although this was condemned by Lord Justice Thomas of the UK during sentencing.

In October 2014 the convictions of Miltiades Papachristos, a sales executive in the Pacific region, and Dennis Kerrison, a former CEO, for conspiracy to corrupt were upheld against appeals. The other two execs had pled guilty. One of the executives, David Turner, received a suspended sentence for testifying against the other executives. The company was released from its Monitor supervision and successfully completed its parole period in early 2015.
