= Tetraethyllead =

Organolead compound

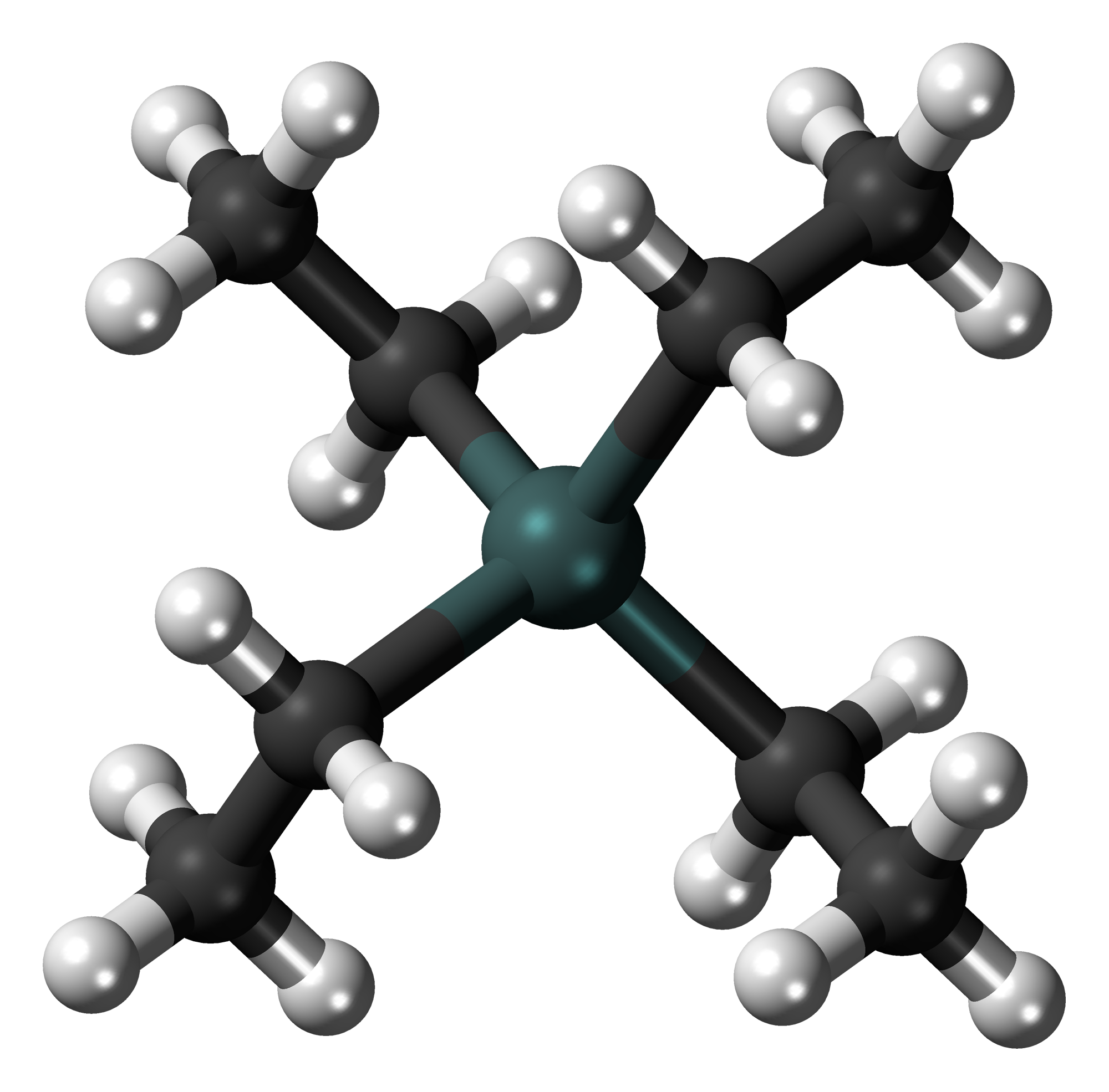

Names
- Preferred IUPAC name Tetraethylplumbane
- Other names Lead tetraethyl Tetraethyl lead Tetra-ethyl lead

Identifiers
CAS Number	78-00-2
3D model (JSmol)	Interactive image
Abbreviations	TEL
Beilstein Reference	3903146
ChEBI	CHEBI:30182
ChemSpider	6265
ECHA InfoCard	100.000.979
EC Number	201-075-4
Gmelin Reference	68951
MeSH	Tetraethyl+lead
PubChem CID	6511
RTECS number	TP4550000
UNII	13426ZWT6A
UN number	1649
CompTox Dashboard (EPA)	DTXSID7023801
- InChI: InChI=1S/4C2H5.Pb/c4*1-2;/h4*1H2,2H3; Key: MRMOZBOQVYRSEM-UHFFFAOYSA-N
- SMILES: CC[Pb](CC)(CC)CC

Properties
Chemical formula	C_{8}H_{20}Pb
Molar mass	323.4 g·mol^{−1}
Appearance	Colorless liquid
Odor	pleasant, sweet
Density	1.653 g cm^{−3}
Melting point	−136 °C (−213 °F; 137 K)
Boiling point	84 to 85 °C (183 to 185 °F; 357 to 358 K) 15 mmHg
Solubility in water	200 parts per billion (ppb) (20 °C)
Vapor pressure	0.2 mmHg (20 °C)
Refractive index (n_{D})	1.5198

Structure
Molecular shape	Tetrahedral
Dipole moment	0 D

Hazards
- Occupational safety and health (OHS/OSH)
Main hazards	Flammable, extremely toxic
- GHS labelling
Pictograms	(GHS06: Toxic) (GHS08: Health hazard) (GHS09: Environmental hazard)
Hazard statements	H300+H310+H330, H360, H373, H410
Precautionary statements	P201, P202, P260, P262, P264, P270, P271, P273, P280, P281, P284, P301+P310, P302+P350, P304+P340, P308+P313, P310, P314, P320, P321, P330, P361, P363, P391, P403+P233, P405, P501
NFPA 704 (fire diamond)	4 2 3
Flash point	73 °C (163 °F; 346 K)
Explosive limits	1.8%–?
- Lethal dose or concentration (LD, LC)
LD_{50} (median dose)	35 mg/kg (rat, oral); 17 mg/kg (rat, oral); 12.3 mg/kg (rat, oral)
LD_{Lo} (lowest published)	30 mg/kg (rabbit, oral); 24 mg/kg (rat, oral)
LC_{50} (median concentration)	850 mg/m^{3} (rat, 1 hr)
LC_{Lo} (lowest published)	650 mg/m^{3} (mouse, 7 hr)
- NIOSH (US health exposure limits)
PEL (Permissible)	TWA 0.075 mg/m^{3} [skin]
REL (Recommended)	TWA 0.075 mg/m^{3} [skin]
IDLH (Immediate danger)	40 mg/m^{3} (as Pb)

Related compounds
Related compounds	Tetramethyllead; Tetraethylmethane; Tetraethylsilane; Tetraethylgermanium; Tetraethyltin
- Except where otherwise noted, data are given for materials in their standard state (at 25 °C [77 °F], 100 kPa). verify (what is ?) Infobox references

Tetraethyllead (commonly styled tetraethyl lead), abbreviated TEL, is an organolead compound with the formula Pb(C_{2}H_{5})_{4}. It was widely used as a fuel additive for much of the 20th century, first being mixed with gasoline beginning in the 1920s. This "leaded gasoline" had an increased octane rating that allowed engine compression to be raised substantially and in turn increased vehicle performance and fuel economy. TEL was first synthesized by German chemist Carl Jacob Löwig in 1853. American chemical engineer Thomas Midgley Jr., who was working for the U.S. corporation General Motors, was the first to discover its effectiveness as a knock inhibitor on 9 December 1921, after spending six years attempting to find an additive that was both highly effective and inexpensive.

Of the some 33,000 substances in total screened, lead was found to be the most effective antiknock agent, in that it necessitated the smallest concentrations necessary; a treatment of 1 part TEL to 1300 parts gasoline by weight is sufficient to suppress detonation. The four ethyl groups in the compound served to dissolve the active lead atom within the fuel. When injected into the combustion chamber, tetraethyllead decomposed upon heating into ethyl radicals, lead, and lead oxide. The lead oxide scavenges radicals and therefore inhibits a flame from developing until full compression has been achieved, allowing the optimal timing of ignition, as well as the lowering of fuel consumption. Throughout the sixty year period from 1926 to 1985, an estimated 20 trillion liters of leaded gasoline at an average lead concentration of 0.4 g/L were produced and sold in the United States alone, or an equivalent of 8 million tons of inorganic lead, three quarters of which would have been emitted in the form of lead chloride and lead bromide. Estimating a similar amount of lead to have come from other countries' emissions, a total of more than 15 million tonnes of lead may have been released into the atmosphere.

In the 1950s, Clair Patterson discovered wide spread lead contamination including surfaces, blood, hair and the atmosphere during his experiments using lead dating to establish the age of the solar system, and determining it was a cause for alarm he began the campaign against lead poisoning in 1965. Lead poisoning was discovered during the second century BCE in Greece, but it wasn't until the mid-20th century, that scientists agreed that TEL contributed to lead poisoning and was highly neurotoxic to the human brain, especially in children. After a prolonged lobbying campaign headed by the Ethyl Corporation to continue using TEL unabated, the United States and many other countries finally began phasing out the use of TEL in automotive fuel in the 1970s with the total elimination of sales of leaded gasoline for on-road vehicles not occurring until on 1 January 1996. By the early 2000s, most countries had banned the use of TEL in gasoline. In July 2021, the sale of leaded gasoline for cars was completely phased out worldwide following the termination of production by Algeria, prompting the United Nations Environment Program (UNEP) to declare an "official end" of its use in cars on 30 August 2021. While TEL is no longer used in automobile gasoline, it remains in use for some specialized fuels such as aviation gasoline (Avgas). In 2011, researchers retroactively estimated the annual impact of tetraethyl lead worldwide to be 322 million lost IQ points, 60+ million crimes, and 4% of worldwide GDP (around 2.4 trillion United States dollars per year).

== Synthesis and properties ==
TEL is a viscous colorless liquid with a sweet odor.

TEL is produced on an industrial scale by reacting chloroethane (ethyl chloride) with a sodium–lead alloy.

4 NaPb + 4 CH_{3}CH_{2}Cl → Pb(CH_{3}CH_{2})_{4} + 4 NaCl + 3 Pb

The product is recovered by steam distillation, leaving a sludge of lead and sodium chloride.

Despite decades of research, no reactions were found to improve upon this process; it is rather difficult, involves reactive metallic sodium, and converts only 25% of the lead to TEL. A related compound, tetramethyllead, was commercially produced by a different electrolytic reaction. However, tetramethyllead was even more difficult to make, and it did not find use beyond niche applications. A highly efficient pathway utilizing ethyl chloride with a slight excess of lithium was developed, with a TEL yield over lead of over 90%. However, by then the fuel additive had started to fall out of favor and into disrepute, and the process was never put into practice.

== Reactions ==
A noteworthy feature of TEL is the weakness of its four C–Pb bonds. At the temperatures found in internal combustion engines, TEL decomposes completely into lead as well as combustible, short-lived ethyl radicals. Lead and lead oxide scavenge radical intermediates in combustion reactions. Engine knock is caused by a cool flame, an oscillating low-temperature combustion reaction that occurs before the proper, hot ignition. Lead quenches the pyrolyzed radicals and thus kills the radical chain reaction that would sustain a cool flame, preventing it from disturbing the smooth ignition of the hot flame front. Lead itself is the reactive antiknock agent, and the ethyl groups serve as a gasoline-soluble carrier.

When TEL burns, it produces not only carbon dioxide and water, but also lead and lead(II) oxide:
$$\ce{Pb(C2H5)4 + 13 O2 -> 8 CO2 + 10 H2O + Pb}$$
$$\ce{2 Pb(C2H5)4 + 27 O2 -> 16 CO2 + 20 H2O + 2 PbO}$$

Pb and PbO would quickly over-accumulate and foul an engine. For this reason, 1,2-dichloroethane and 1,2-dibromoethane were also added to gasoline as lead scavengers—these agents form volatile lead(II) chloride and lead(II) bromide, respectively, which flush the lead from the engine and into the air:
$$\ce{Pb(C2H5)4 + C2H4X2 + 16 O2 -> 10 CO2 + 12 H2O + PbX2}$$

== In motor fuel ==
TEL was extensively used as a gasoline additive beginning in the 1920s, wherein it served as an effective antiknock agent and reduced exhaust valve and valve seat wear. Concerns were raised in reputable journals of likely health outcomes of fine particles of lead in the atmosphere as early as 1924.

=== Valve wear preventive ===
Tetraethyllead helps cool intake valves and is an excellent buffer against microwelds forming between exhaust valves and their seats. Once these valves reopen, the microwelds pull apart and abrade the valves and seats, leading to valve recession. When TEL began to be phased out, the automotive industry began specifying hardened valve seats and upgraded materials which allow for high wear resistance without requiring lead.

=== Antiknock agent ===
A gasoline-fueled reciprocating engine requires fuel of sufficient octane rating to prevent uncontrolled combustion (pre-ignition and detonation). Antiknock agents allow the use of higher compression ratios for greater efficiency and peak power. Adding varying amounts of additives to gasoline allowed easy, inexpensive control of octane ratings. TEL offered the business advantage of being commercially profitable because its use for this purpose could be patented. Aviation fuels with TEL used in WWII reached octane ratings of 150 to enable turbocharged and supercharged engines such as the Rolls-Royce Merlin and Griffon to reach high horsepower ratings at altitude. In military aviation, TEL manipulation allowed a range of different fuels to be tailored for particular flight conditions.

In 1935 a license to produce TEL was given to IG Farben, enabling the newly formed German Luftwaffe to use high-octane gasoline for high altitude flight. A company, Ethyl GmbH, was formed that produced TEL at two sites in Germany with a government contract from 10 June 1936.

In 1938 the United Kingdom Air Ministry contracted with ICI for the construction and operation of a TEL plant. A site was chosen at Holford Moss, near Plumley in Cheshire. Construction started in April 1939 and TEL was being produced by September 1940.

=== "Ethyl Fluid" ===
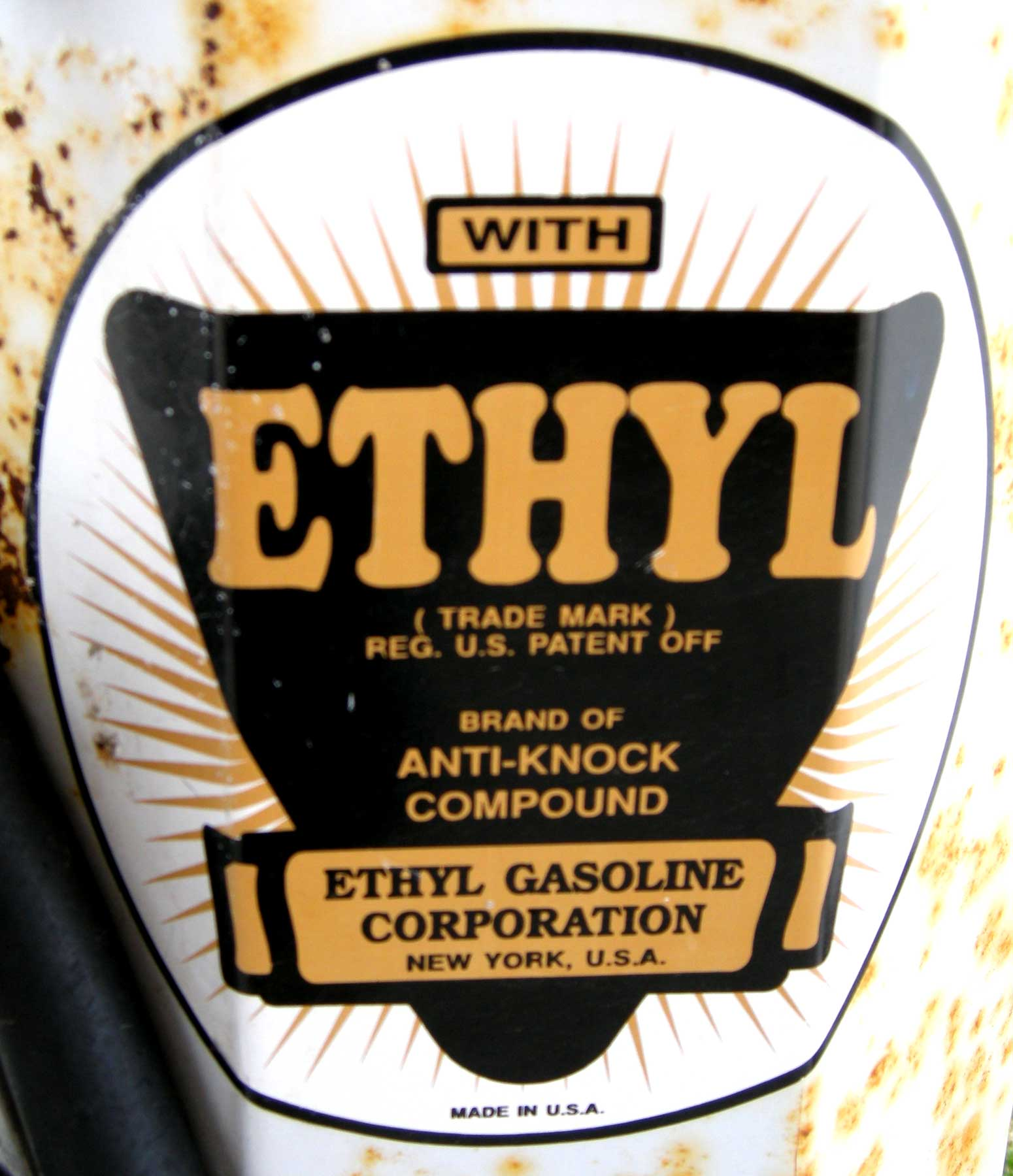
Sign on an antique gasoline pump advertising tetraethyllead by the Ethyl Corporation

For mixing with raw gasoline, TEL was most commonly supplied in the form of "Ethyl Fluid", consisting of TEL blended with 1,2-dichloroethane and 1,2-dibromoethane, which prevent lead from building up in the engine. Ethyl Fluid also contained a reddish dye to distinguish treated from untreated gasoline and discourage the use of leaded gasoline for other purposes such as cleaning.

In the 1920s, before safety procedures were strengthened, 17 workers for the Ethyl Corporation, DuPont, and Standard Oil died from the effects of exposure to lead. The grim news was not well received by US legislators and a brief ban was put into place. However, it was lifted on recommendation of the United States Surgeon General and a panel of scientists in 1929, after extensive lobbying efforts by the aforementioned companies. It would be another half century until a similar effort was made to rein in the additive, spearheaded by the EPA in the 1980s. This time, concerns for health and the environment were aided by the increasing use of catalytic converters, which cannot tolerate TEL.

Ethyl Fluid's formulation consisted of:

- 61.45% tetraethyllead
- 18.80% 1,2-dichloroethane
- 17.85% 1,2-dibromoethane
- 1.90% inerts, preservatives, and dyes

It was found that dichloroethane and dibromoethane act in a synergistic manner, in that approximately equal quantities of both provide the best scavenging ability, thus preventing engines from fouling up due to deposits of inorganic lead within the pistons and exhausts.

=== Phaseout and ban ===
In most industrialized countries, a phaseout of TEL from road vehicle fuels was completed by the early 2000s because of concerns over air and soil lead levels and the accumulative neurotoxicity of lead. In the European Union, tetraethyllead has been classified as a Substance of Very High Concern and placed on the Candidate List for Authorization under Registration, Evaluation, Authorization and Restriction of Chemicals (REACH). Potential use of TEL would need to be authorized through the REACH authorization procedure. While not a complete ban, it introduces significant obligations such as a mandatory analysis of alternatives and socioeconomic analysis.

The use of catalytic converters, mandated in the United States for 1975 and later model-year cars to meet tighter emissions regulations, started a gradual phase-out of leaded gasoline in the U.S. The need for TEL was lessened by several advances in automotive engineering and petroleum chemistry. Safer methods for making higher-octane blending stocks such as reformate and iso-octane reduced the need to rely on TEL, as did other antiknock additives of varying toxicity including metallic compounds such as methylcyclopentadienyl manganese tricarbonyl (MMT) as well as oxygenates including methyl tert-butyl ether (MTBE), tert-amyl methyl ether (TAME), and ethyl tert-butyl ether (ETBE).

The first country to completely ban leaded gasoline was Japan in 1986.

Since January 1993, all gasoline powered cars sold in the European Union and the United Kingdom have been required to use unleaded fuel. This was to comply with the Euro 1 emission standards which mandated that all new cars to be fitted with a catalytic converter. Unleaded fuel was first introduced in the United Kingdom in June 1986.

Leaded gasoline was removed from the forecourts in the United Kingdom on 1 January 2000, and a Lead Replacement Petrol was introduced although this was largely withdrawn by 2003 due to dwindling sales. An exemption to the ban exists for owners of classic cars.

Vehicles designed and built to run on leaded fuel often require modification to run on unleaded gasoline. These modifications fall into two categories: those required for physical compatibility with unleaded fuel, and those performed to compensate for the relatively low octane of early unleaded fuels. Physical compatibility requires the installation of hardened exhaust valves and seats, or by use of additives. Compatibility with reduced octane was addressed by reducing compression, generally by installing thicker cylinder head gaskets and/or rebuilding the engine with compression-reducing pistons (although modern high-octane unleaded gasoline has eliminated the need to decrease compression ratios), and/or by retarding ignition timing.

Leaded gasoline for road vehicles remained legal as of late 2014 in parts of Algeria, Iraq, Yemen, Myanmar, North Korea, and Afghanistan. North Korea and Myanmar purchased their TEL from China, while Algeria, Iraq, and Yemen purchased it from the specialty chemical company Innospec, the world's sole remaining legal manufacturer of TEL. In 2011 several Innospec executives were charged and imprisoned for bribing various government state-owned oil companies to approve the sale of their TEL products.

As of June 2016 the UNEP-sponsored phase-out was nearly complete: only Algeria, Iraq, and Yemen continued widespread use of leaded gasoline, although not exclusively. In July 2021, Algeria had halted its sale. Leaded aviation gasoline remains in widespread use.

==== Leaded-fuel bans ====
Interactive map of the phase-out of leaded gasoline from 1972 to 2021. Click on the image to explore interactivity

Leaded-fuel bans for road vehicles came into effect as follows:

===== Europe =====
- Armenia: 2001
- Austria: 1989
- Belarus: 1998
- Bulgaria: 2002
- Bosnia and Herzegovina: 2009
- Croatia: 2006
- Cyprus: 2004
- Czech Republic: 2001
- Denmark: 1994
- European Union: 1 January 2000
- Finland: 1994
- France: 2000
- Germany: 1996
- Gibraltar: 2001
- Greece: 2002
- Hungary: 1999
- Ireland: 1 January 2000
- Italy: 1 January 2002
- Malta: 2003
- Monaco: 2000
- Netherlands: 1998
- Norway: 1997
- Poland: December 2000
- Slovenia: 2001
- Spain: 1 August 2001
- Portugal: 1999
- Romania: 2005
- Russia: 2003
- Serbia: 2010
- Sweden: 1995
- Switzerland: 2000
- Ukraine: 2003
- United Kingdom: 1 January 2000

===== North America =====
- Anguilla: 1998
- Antigua and Barbuda: 1991
- Aruba: 1997
- Bahamas: 1996
- Belize: 1997
- Bermuda: 1990
- Cayman Islands: 1999
- Canada: December 1990
- Costa Rica: 1996
- Dominican Republic: 1999
- El Salvador: 1992
- Guatemala: 1991
- Haiti: 1998
- Honduras: 1996
- Jamaica: 2000
- Mexico: 1998
- Nicaragua: 1995
- Panama: 2002
- Trinidad and Tobago: 2000
- United States (including Puerto Rico): 1 January 1996
  - California: 1992

===== South America =====
- Argentina: 1998
- Bolivia: 1995
- Brazil: 1989 or 1991
- Chile: 2001 or 2005
- Colombia: 1991
- Guyana: 2000
- Peru: 2004
- Suriname: 2001
- Uruguay: 2004
- Venezuela: 2005

===== Asia =====
- Afghanistan: 2016
- Bangladesh: 1999
- China: 2000
- Hong Kong: 1999
- India: March 2000
- Saudi Arabia: 2001
- Indonesia: 2006
- Iran: 2003
- Iraq: 2018
- Japan: 1986
- Malaysia: 2000
- Myanmar: 2016
- Nepal: 2000
- North Korea: 2016
- Pakistan: 2001
- Philippines: 2000
- Singapore: 1998
- South Korea: 1993
- Sri Lanka: 1999
- Taiwan: 2000
- Thailand: 1996
- Turkey: 2006
- United Arab Emirates: 2003
- Vietnam: 2001
- Yemen: 2018

===== Oceania =====
- Australia: 2002
- New Zealand: 1996
- Guam: 1 January 1996 (USA)
- Samoa: 2001

===== Africa =====
- Egypt: 1999
- South Africa: 2006
- Leaded petrol was supposed to be completely phased out continent-wide on 1 January 2006, following a ban initiated from the 2002 Earth Summit. However, in Algeria refineries needed to be altered; as a result, leaded fuel remained available in parts of Algeria, with phaseout scheduled for 2016. After the Algerian Government outlawed the sale of leaded petrol throughout all of Algeria, leaded petrol was finally phased out by July 2021.

==== In motor racing ====
Leaded fuel was commonly used in professional motor racing, until its phase out beginning in the 1990s. In 1992, the FIA decided it would be illegal to use any substance in fuel that was not found in commercial gasoline so starting in 1992, Formula One racing cars have been required to use fuel containing no more than 13 mg/L of lead, with the limit lowering to no more than 5 mg/L since 1994.

NASCAR began experimentation in 1998 with an unleaded fuel, and in 2006 began switching the national series to unleaded fuel, completing the transition at the Fontana round in February 2007 when the premier class switched. This was influenced after blood tests of NASCAR teams revealed elevated blood lead levels.

==== Aviation gasoline ====
TEL remains an ingredient of 100 octane avgas for piston-engine aircraft. The current formulation of 100LL (low lead, blue) aviation gasoline contains 2.12 grams per US gallon (0.56 g/L) of TEL, half the amount of the previous 100/130 (green) octane avgas (at 4.24 grams per gallon), and twice as much as the 1 gram per gallon permitted in regular automotive leaded gasoline prior to 1988 and substantially greater than the allowed 0.001 grams per gallon in automotive unleaded gasoline sold in the United States today. The United States Environmental Protection Agency, FAA, and others are working on economically feasible replacements for leaded avgas, which still releases 100 tons of lead every year.

==== Alternative antiknock agents ====
Antiknock agents are classed as high-percentage additives, such as alcohol, and low-percentage additives based on heavy elements. Since the main problem with TEL is its lead content, many alternative additives that contain less poisonous metals have been examined. A manganese-carrying additive, methylcyclopentadienyl manganese tricarbonyl (MMT or methylcymantrene), was used for a time as an antiknock agent, though its safety is controversial and it has been the subject of bans and lawsuits. Ferrocene, an organometallic compound of iron, is also used as an antiknock agent although with some significant drawbacks.

High-percentage additives are organic compounds that do not contain metals, but require much higher blending ratios, such as 20–30% for benzene and ethanol. It had been established by 1921 that ethanol was an effective antiknock agent, but TEL was introduced instead mainly for commercial reasons. Oxygenates such as tert-amyl methyl ether derived from natural gas, MTBE made from methanol, and ethanol-derived ETBE, have largely supplanted TEL. MTBE has environmental risks of its own and there are also bans on its use.

Improvements to gasoline itself decrease the need for antiknock additives. Synthetic iso-octane and alkylate are examples of such blending stocks. Benzene and other high-octane aromatics can be also blended to raise the octane number, but they are disfavored today because of toxicity and carcinogenicity.

== Toxicity ==
6 mL of tetraethyllead is enough to induce severe lead poisoning. The hazards of TEL content are heightened due to the compound's volatility and high lipophilicity, enabling it to easily cross the blood–brain barrier.

Because TEL is charge neutral and contains an exterior of alkyl groups, it is highly lipophilic and soluble in petrol (gasoline). This property, which allows it to dissolve so evenly and effectively in motor fuel, also allowed easy absorption by body fats and lipids and diffusion through the blood–brain barrier (BBB). The lead (II) ions (Pb^{2+}) would accumulate within the limbic forebrain, frontal cortex, and hippocampus. Practically speaking, TEL is a "central nervous system toxin which produces an acute toxic psychosis."

There is no cure for direct poisoning by TEL. Inorganic lead compounds, such as those present in engine exhausts, could be removed from the system through the administration of chelating agents, which bind to the inorganic lead and flush them out of the body. However, highly lipid-soluble TEL cannot be removed this way, and treatments are of a supportive nature.

Early symptoms of acute exposure to tetraethyllead can manifest as irritation of the eyes and skin, sneezing, fever, vomiting, and a metallic taste in the mouth. Later symptoms of acute TEL poisoning include pulmonary edema, anemia, ataxia, convulsions, severe weight loss, delirium, irritability, hallucinations, nightmares, fever, muscle and joint pain, swelling of the brain, coma, and damage to cardiovascular and renal organs. Chronic exposure to TEL can cause long-term negative effects such as memory loss, delayed reflexes, neurological problems, insomnia, tremors, psychosis, loss of attention, and an overall decrease in IQ and cognitive function.

The carcinogenity of tetraethyllead is debatable. It is believed to harm the male reproductive system and cause birth defects.

Concerns over the toxicity of lead eventually led to the ban on TEL in automobile gasoline in many countries. Some neurologists have speculated that the lead phaseout may have caused average IQ levels to rise by several points in the US (by reducing cumulative brain damage throughout the population, especially in the young). For the entire US population, during and after the TEL phaseout, the mean blood lead level dropped from 16 μg/dL in 1976 to only 3 μg/dL in 1991. The U.S. Centers of Disease control previously labelled children with 10 μg/dL or more as having a "blood lead level of concern". In 2021, the level was lowered in accordance with the average lead level in the U.S. decreasing to 3.5 μg/dL or more as having a "blood lead level of concern".

== History ==
In 1853, German chemist Karl Jacob Löwig (1803–1890) first prepared what he claimed was Pb_{2}(C_{2}H_{5})_{3} from ethyl iodide and an alloy of lead and sodium. In 1859, English chemist George Bowdler Buckton (1818–1905) reported what he claimed was Pb(C_{2}H_{5})_{2} from zinc ethyl (Zn(C_{2}H_{5})_{2}) and lead(II) chloride. Later authors credit both methods of preparation with producing tetraethyl lead.

=== In fuel ===
TEL remained unimportant commercially until the 1920s. In 1921, at the direction of DuPont Corporation, which manufactured TEL, it was found to be an effective antiknock agent by Thomas Midgley Jr., working under Charles Kettering at General Motors Corporation Research. General Motors patented the use of TEL as an antiknock agent and used the name "Ethyl" that had been proposed by Kettering in its marketing materials, thereby avoiding the negative connotation of the word "lead". Early research into "engine knocking" (also called "pinging" or "pinking") was also led by A.H. Gibson and Harry Ricardo in England and Thomas Boyd in the United States. The discovery that lead additives modified this behavior led to the widespread adoption of their use in the 1920s, and therefore more powerful, higher-compression engines. In 1924, Standard Oil of New Jersey (ESSO/EXXON) and General Motors created the Ethyl Gasoline Corporation to produce and market TEL. Deepwater, New Jersey, across the river from Wilmington, was the site for production of some of DuPont's most important chemicals, particularly TEL. After TEL production at the Bayway Refinery was shut down, Deepwater was the only plant in the Western hemisphere producing TEL up to 1948, when it accounted for the bulk of the Dupont/Deepwater's production.

=== Initial controversy ===
The toxicity of concentrated TEL was recognized early on, as lead had been recognized since the 19th century as a dangerous substance that could cause lead poisoning. In 1924, a public controversy arose over the "loony gas", after five workers died, and many others were severely injured, in Standard Oil refineries in New Jersey. There had also been a private controversy for two years prior to this controversy; several public health experts, including Alice Hamilton and Yandell Henderson, engaged Midgley and Kettering with letters warning of the dangers to public health. After the death of the workers, dozens of newspapers reported on the issue. The New York Times editorialized in 1924 that the deaths should not interfere with the production of more powerful fuel.

To settle the issue, the U.S. Public Health Service conducted a conference in 1925, and the sales of TEL were voluntarily suspended for one year to conduct a hazard assessment. The conference was initially expected to last for several days, but reportedly the conference decided that evaluating presentations on alternative anti-knock agents was not "its province", so it lasted a single day. Kettering and Midgley stated that no alternatives for anti-knocking were available, although private memos showed discussion of such agents. One commonly discussed agent was ethanol. The Public Health Service created a committee that reviewed a government-sponsored study of workers and an Ethyl lab test, and concluded that while leaded gasoline should not be banned, it should continue to be investigated. The low concentrations present in gasoline and exhaust were not perceived as immediately dangerous. A U.S. Surgeon General committee issued a report in 1926 that concluded there was no real evidence that the sale of TEL was hazardous to human health but urged further study. In the years that followed, research was heavily funded by the lead industry; in 1943, Randolph Byers found children with lead poisoning had behavior problems, but the Lead Industries Association threatened him with a lawsuit and the research ended.

In the late 1920s, Robert A. Kehoe of the University of Cincinnati was the Ethyl Corporation's chief medical consultant and one of the lead industry's staunchest advocates, who would not be discredited until decades later by Dr. Clair Patterson's work on human lead burdens (see below) and other studies. In 1928, Dr. Kehoe expressed the opinion that there was no basis for concluding that leaded fuels posed any health threat. He convinced the Surgeon General that the dose–response relationship of lead had "no effect" below a certain threshold. As the head of Kettering Laboratories for many years, Kehoe would become a chief promoter of the safety of TEL, an influence that did not begin to wane until about the early 1960s. But by the 1970s, the general opinion of the safety of TEL would change, and by 1976 the U.S. government would begin to require the phaseout of this product.

In the late 1940s and early 1950s, Clair Cameron Patterson accidentally discovered the pollution caused by TEL in the environment while determining the age of the Earth. As he attempted to measure lead content of very old rocks, and the time it took uranium to decay into lead, the readings were made inaccurate by lead in the environment that contaminated his samples. He was then forced to work in a cleanroom to keep his samples uncontaminated by environmental pollution of lead. After coming up with a fairly accurate estimate of the age of the Earth, he turned to investigating the lead contamination problem by examining ice cores from countries such as Greenland. He realized that the lead contamination in the environment dated from about the time that TEL became widely used as a fuel additive in gasoline. Being aware of the health dangers posed by lead and suspicious of the pollution caused by TEL, he became one of the earliest and most effective proponents of removing it from use.

In the 1960s, the first clinical works were published proving the toxicity of this compound in humans, e.g. by Mirosław Jan Stasik.

=== Modern findings ===
In the 1970s, Herbert Needleman found that higher lead levels in children were correlated with decreased school performance. Needleman was repeatedly accused of scientific misconduct by individuals within the lead industry, but he was eventually cleared by a scientific advisory council. Needleman also wrote the average US child's blood lead level was 13.7 μg/dL in 1976 and that Patterson believed that everyone was to some degree poisoned by TEL in gasoline.

In the U.S. in 1973, the United States Environmental Protection Agency issued regulations to reduce the lead content of leaded gasoline over a series of annual phases, which therefore came to be known as the "lead phasedown" program. EPA's rules were issued under section 211 of the Clean Air Act, as amended 1970. The Ethyl Corp challenged the EPA regulations in federal court. Although the EPA's regulation was initially invalidated, the EPA won the case on appeal, so the TEL phasedown began to be implemented in 1976. Leaded gas was banned in vehicles with catalytic converters in 1975 due to damage of catalytic converters but it continued to be sold for vehicles without catalytic converters. Additional regulatory changes were made by EPA over the next decade (including adoption of a trading market in "lead credits" in 1982 that became the precursor of the Acid Rain Allowance Market, adopted in 1990 for SO_{2}), but the decisive rule was issued in 1985. The EPA mandated that lead additive be reduced by 91 percent by the end of 1986. A 1994 study had indicated that the concentration of lead in the blood of the U.S. population had dropped 78% from 1976 to 1991. The U.S. phasedown regulations also were due in great part to studies conducted by Philip J. Landrigan.

In Europe, Derek Bryce-Smith was among the first to highlight the potential dangers of TEL and became a leading campaigner for removal of lead additives from petrol.

From 1 January 1996, the U.S. Clean Air Act banned the sale of leaded fuel for use in on-road vehicles although that year the US EPA indicated that TEL could still be used in aircraft, racing cars, farm equipment, and marine engines. Thus, what had begun in the U.S. as a phase down ultimately ended in a phase-out for on-road vehicle TEL. Similar bans in other countries have resulted in lowering levels of lead in people's bloodstreams.

Taking cue from the domestic programs, the U.S. Agency for International Development undertook an initiative to reduce tetraethyl lead use in other countries, notably its efforts in Egypt begun in 1995. In 1996, with the cooperation of the U.S. AID, Egypt took almost all of the lead out of its gasoline. The success in Egypt provided a model for AID efforts worldwide.

By 2000, the TEL industry had moved the major portion of their sales to developing countries whose governments they lobbied against phasing out leaded gasoline. Leaded gasoline was withdrawn entirely from the European Union market on 1 January 2000, although it had been banned earlier in most member states. Other countries also phased out TEL. India banned leaded petrol in March 2000.

By 2011, the United Nations announced that it had been successful in phasing out leaded gasoline worldwide. "Ridding the world of leaded petrol, with the United Nations leading the effort in developing countries, has resulted in $2.4 trillion in annual benefits, 1.2 million fewer premature deaths, higher overall intelligence and 58 million fewer crimes", the United Nations Environmental Program said. The announcement was slightly premature, as a few countries still had leaded gasoline for sale as of 2017. On 30 August 2021 the United Nations Environment Program announced that leaded gasoline had been eliminated. The final stocks were used up in Algeria, which had continued to produce leaded gasoline until July 2021.

=== Effect on crime rates ===
Reduction in the average blood lead level is believed to have been a major cause for falling violent crime rates in the United States. A statistically significant correlation has been found between the usage rate of leaded gasoline and violent crime: the violent crime curve virtually tracks the lead exposure curve with a 22-year time lag. After the ban on TEL, blood lead levels in U.S. children dramatically decreased. Researchers including Amherst College economist Jessica Wolpaw Reyes, Department of Housing and Urban Development consultant Rick Nevin, and Howard Mielke of Tulane University say that declining exposure to lead is responsible for an up to 56% decline in crime from 1992 to 2002. Taking into consideration other factors that are believed to have increased crime rates over that period, Reyes found that the reduced exposure to lead led to an actual decline of 34% over that period.

=== Lingering issues over time ===
Although leaded gasoline has long since ended its history of regular use in U.S. transportation, it has left high concentrations of lead in the soil adjacent to roads that were heavily used prior to its phaseout. These contaminated materials present health dangers even when merely touched or when components of it get breathed in. Children, especially those in poverty inside of the U.S., are particularly at risk.

== See also ==
- Elmer Keiser Bolton
- Lead abatement
- List of petrol additives
