= Georgeite =

Amorphous copper hydroxycarbonate mineral

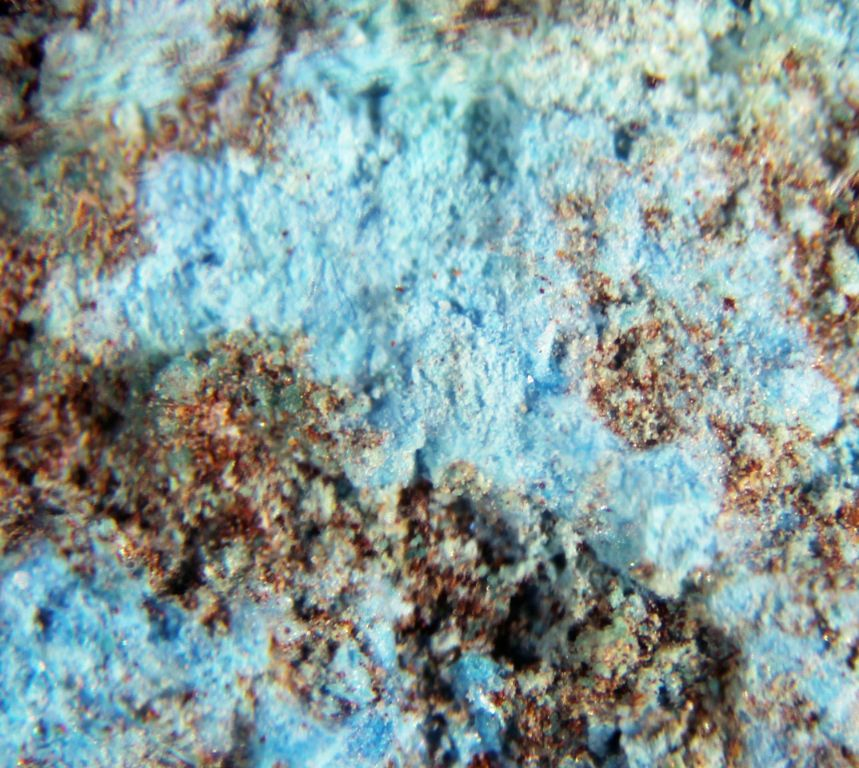
- Sky blue georgeite associated to blue chalconatronite, found in Western Australia

General
- Category: Carbonate mineral
- Formula: [Cu(OH)_{2−x}(H_{2}O)_{x}][CO_{3}]_{x/2}
- IMA symbol: Gg
- Strunz classification: 5.BA.10
- Crystal system: Amorphous
- Crystal class: Amorphous / gel-like

Identification
- Color: Sky-blue to bluish
- Fracture: Sub-conchoidal
- Mohs scale hardness: 1–2
- Luster: Vitreous to earthy
- Streak: Pale blue
- Diaphaneity: Transparent to opaque
- Specific gravity: ~2.55
- Optical properties: Isotropic

Georgeite is an extremely rare, X-ray amorphous copper hydroxycarbonate mineral, related to crystalline copper carbonates such as malachite. It occurs as pale blue, powdery or gel-like coatings in the oxidation zones of copper-bearing ores and was first identified in 1979.

== Discovery and nomenclature ==
Georgeite was named after the late George Herbert Payne, Western Australia Government Chemical Laboratories former mineral division chief. It was first described in 1979, found within the Carr Boyd nickel mine in Western Australia. The mineral was confirmed as a new species after being found to be amorphous to X-rays, distinguishing it from crystalline copper carbonates.

The holotype material is held at the Western Australian Museum.

== Chemical composition and structure ==
Georgeite is a copper hydroxycarbonate, with early analyses giving an approximate empirical composition similar to Cu_{5}(CO_{3})_{3}(OH)_{4}·6H_{2}O in hydrated form, but the current accepted formula is [Cu(OH)_{2−x}(H_{2}O)_{x}][CO_{3}]_{x/2}, permitting variable structural water. Georgeite is X-ray and electron-beam amorphous, lacking long-range crystallographic order.

== Occurrence and associated minerals ==
Georgeite forms in supergene environments—oxidation zones of copper (or copper-nickel) sulphide deposits—often where carbonate or alkaline fluids are present. The type locality is Carr Boyd dump in Western Australia. It is also known to exist in Britannia Mine, Snowdonia, Wales. Associated minerals include malachite and chalconatronite, both of which georgeite can recrystallize into.

Because of this tendency to recrystallize, natural occurrences of georgeite are scarce and delicate. However, synthetic georgeite is now of interest in catalysis and materials science, expanding the relevance of georgeite beyond pure mineralogical description.

== Synthesis ==
Despite natural georgeite's rarity, amorphous copper hydroxycarbonate is relatively simple to create in laboratory settings. An early reproducible synthesis was described in 1991, which demonstrated that the amorphous blue precipitate would rapidly recrystallize into more stable crystalline malachite and chalconatronite, especially when agitated. At the time, this instability hindered its detailed study and application.

A significant breakthrough was published to the journal Nature in 2016, where researchers successfully implemented a novel process to create stable georgeite.

== Industrial significance ==
The primary industrial interest in synthetic georgeite is its role as a superior precursor material for copper-zinc oxide (Cu/ZnO) catalysts. These catalysts are critical for two major industrial processes:

- Methanol synthesis: The production of methanol is a multi-billion dollar industry, as it is a key chemical feedstock and an emerging clean fuel.
- Low temperature water-gas shift (LTS): This reaction is used to produce high-purity hydrogen for the synthesis of ammonia and other processes.

The conventional catalysts for these reactions are made from crystalline precursors like zincian malachite. However, a 2016 study showed that catalysts derived from their stable amorphous georgeite precursor exhibit significantly higher activity and stability. The development of these more efficient catalysts could lead to improved productivity and energy efficiency in these vital chemical industries.

== Environmental and geochemical significance ==
Georgeite-like precipitates have been observed in controlled laboratory precipitations relevant to copper in water and pipe corrosion systems. Such studies shed light on copper solubility, transport, and potential for forming amorphous phases under environmental conditions.

== See also ==
- Azurite
- Carbonate mineral
- Chalconatronite
- Malachite
