= DOCO =

DOCO, doco, or DoCo may refer to:

- DoCo (pop group), an in-character band composed of voice actors from the Ranma ½ anime series
- Downtown Commons, an urban district in Sacramento, California sometimes referred to as “DoCo”
- Martin "Doco" Doherty (1958–1994), Irish member of the Provisional Irish Republican Army
- DOCO, a chemical formula for the deuterated form of hydrocarboxyl
- Famous (TV channel), an Australian subscription television channel focusing on HBO documentaries, formerly known as Docos
- An abbreviation for software documentation
- A slang term for a documentary film
