= HOCO =

HOCO or hoco or HoCo may refer to:

- Hydrocarboxyl, in chemistry, an unstable molecular radical important in combustion
- Howard County, Maryland, informal abbreviation for the U.S. county
- Homecoming
