= Benzotriazole =

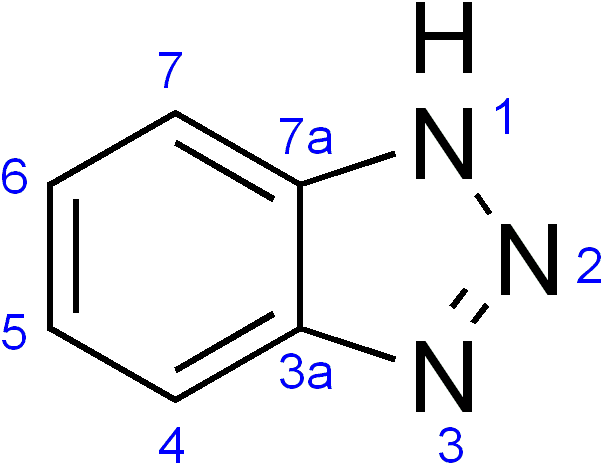

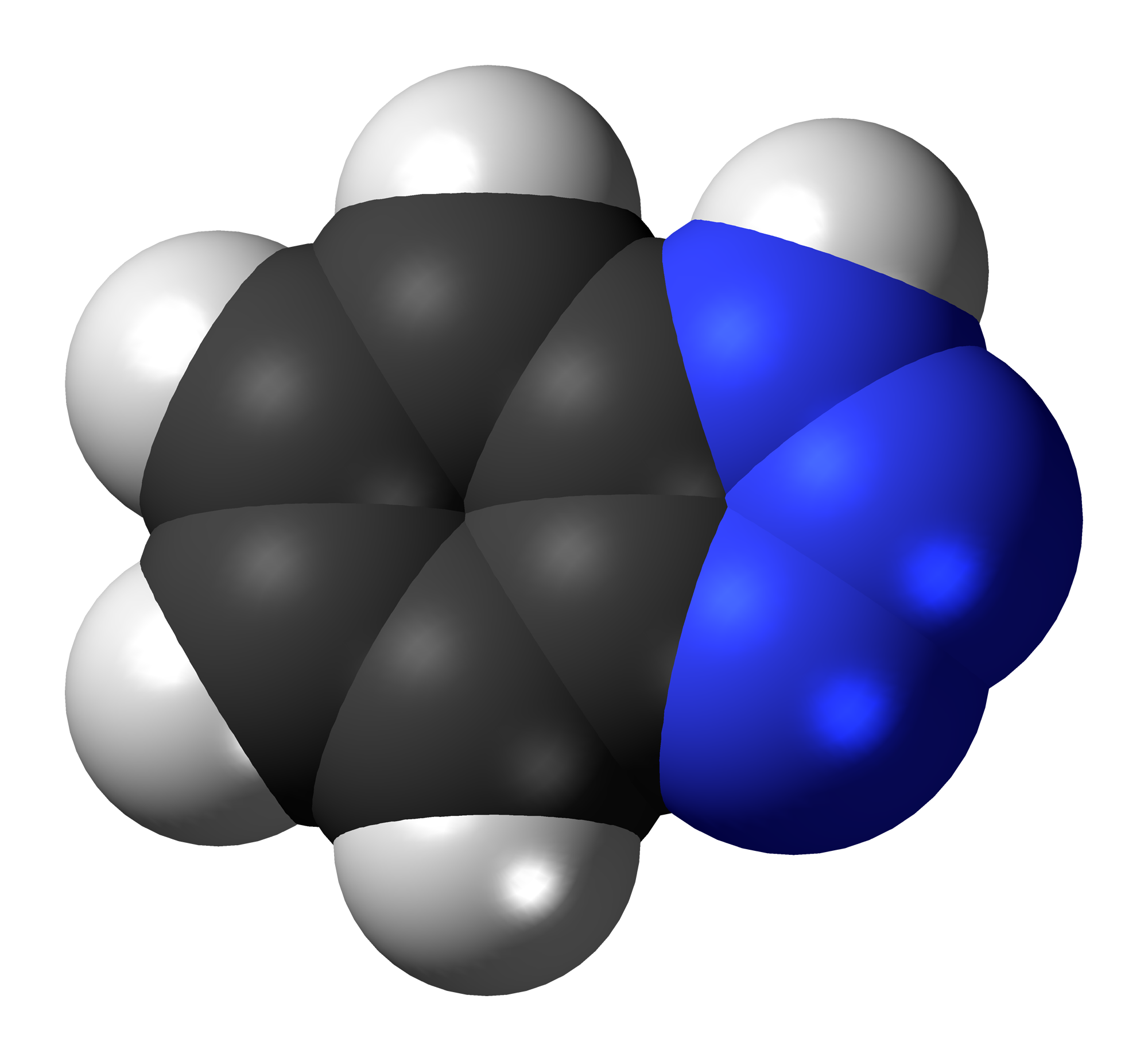

Names
- Preferred IUPAC name 1H-1,2,3-Benzotriazole
- Other names: 1H-Benzotriazole; 1,2,3-Benzotriazole

Identifiers
CAS Number	95-14-7
3D model (JSmol)	Interactive image
Abbreviations	BTA; BtaH
ChEBI	CHEBI:75331
ChEMBL	ChEMBL84963
ChemSpider	6950
ECHA InfoCard	100.002.177
EC Number	202-394-1
PubChem CID	7220
RTECS number	DM1225000
UNII	86110UXM5Y
CompTox Dashboard (EPA)	DTXSID6020147
- InChI: InChI=1S/C6H5N3/c1-2-4-6-5(3-1)7-9-8-6/h1-4H,(H,7,8,9) Key: QRUDEWIWKLJBPS-UHFFFAOYSA-N; InChI=1/C6H5N3/c1-2-4-6-5(3-1)7-9-8-6/h1-4H,(H,7,8,9) Key: QRUDEWIWKLJBPS-UHFFFAOYAH
- SMILES: n1c2ccccc2[nH]n1

Properties
Chemical formula	C_{6}H_{5}N_{3}
Molar mass	119.127 g·mol^{−1}
Appearance	Light yellow solid
Density	1.369 g/cm^{3}
Melting point	98.5 °C (209.3 °F; 371.6 K)
Boiling point	204 °C (399 °F; 477 K) (15 mmHg (2.0 kPa))
Solubility in water	1.9 g/100mL
log P	1.34
Vapor pressure	0.053 hPa (0.00077 psi)
Acidity (pK_{a})	8.2
Basicity (pK_{b})	> 14

Structure
Crystal structure	triclinic
Space group	P1̅, No. 2
Point group	1̅
Lattice constant	a = 4.2422(11) Å, b = 17.827(6) Å, c = 20.685(7) Å α = 72.63(3)°, β = 87.15(2)°, γ = 86.23(3)°
Lattice volume (V)	1489.0(8) Å^{3}
Formula units (Z)	10

Hazards
- GHS labelling
Pictograms	(GHS07: Exclamation mark) (GHS09: Environmental hazard)
Signal word	Warning
Hazard statements	H302, H319, H411
Precautionary statements	P264, P270, P273, P280, P301+P312+P330, P305+P351+P338, P337+P313, P391, P501
NFPA 704 (fire diamond)	2 1 2
Flash point	170 °C (338 °F; 443 K)
Autoignition temperature	400 °C (752 °F; 673 K)
Explosive limits	2.4%-?
- Lethal dose or concentration (LD, LC)
LD_{50} (median dose)	500 mg/kg (oral, rat)

Related compounds
Related compounds	Benzimidazole; Tolyltriazole
- Except where otherwise noted, data are given for materials in their standard state (at 25 °C [77 °F], 100 kPa). verify (what is ?) Infobox references

Benzotriazole (BTA) is a heterocyclic compound with the chemical formula C_{6}H_{4}N_{3}H. It can be viewed as the fusion of a benzene and triazole rings. It is a white solid, although impure samples can appear tan. It is used as a corrosion inhibitor for copper and silver.

== Structure and synthesis ==
Benzotriazole features two fused rings. It can in principle exist as tautomers, but X-ray crystallography establishes the structure with hydrogen at the 1 position. The N=N and HN−N distances are 1.306 Å and 1.340 Å.

Benzotriazole can be prepared by the reaction of o-phenylenediamine with a mixture sodium nitrite and acetic acid (a portion of this reaction mechanism is shown below):

== Reactions ==
=== Acid-base behavior ===
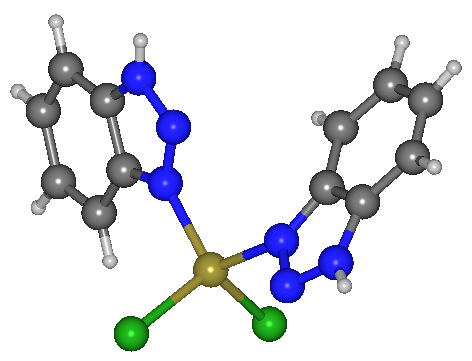
Structure of ZnCl_{2}(BTA)_{2}

BTA is a weak Bronsted acid with a pK_{a} = 8.2. It is a weak Brønsted base, as indicated by the low pK_{a} < 0 of its conjugate acid, [HBTA]^{+}.

It is also a Lewis base, binding Lewis acids at the C−N=N center. A variety coordination complexes are known such as the tetrahedral 2:1 derivative with zinc chloride, ZnCl_{2}(BTA)_{2}. In some complexes, BTA binds metals as its conjugate base forming polymers and oligomers. It binds to copper surfaces, serving as a corrosion inhibitor.

=== N-alkylation ===

Deprotonation of BTA followed by treatment with alkyl halides gives a mixture of 1- and 2-alkyl derivatives. Aromatic aldehydes (ArCHO) in the presence of ethanol gives benzotriazole-based N,O-acetals:

ArCHO + BtH + EtOH → ArCH(OEt)(Bt) + H_{2}O

These acetals are susceptible to deprotonation, giving access to acylsilanes and acylboranes.

N-amination of BTA with hydroxylamine-O-sulfonic acid gives 1-aminobenzotriazole. Oxidation of this amine with lead(IV) acetate affords benzyne, which rapidly dimerises to biphenylene.

== Applications ==
Benzotriazole has been used as a restrainer (or anti-fogging agent) in photographic emulsions or developing solutions, and as a reagent for the analytical determination of silver. More importantly, it has been extensively used as a corrosion inhibitor in the atmosphere and underwater. BTA can be used in antifreezes, heating and cooling systems, hydraulic fluids, and vapor-phase inhibitors as well.

=== Corrosion inhibition ===
Benzotriazole is an corrosion inhibitor for non-ferrous metals like copper and silver. It is known that a passive layer, consisting of a complex between copper and benzotriazole, is formed when copper is immersed in a solution containing benzotriazole. The passive layer is insoluble in aqueous and many organic solutions. There is a positive correlation between the thickness of the passive layer and the efficiency of preventing corrosion. BTA is used in heritage conservation, notably for the treatment of bronze disease, and in dishwashing detergents for silver protection.

Chemical structure of the coordination polymer from benzotriazolate and copper(I), the active ingredient in the BT-derived corrosion inhibition

== Environmental relevance ==
Benzotriazole is fairly water-soluble, is not readily degraded, and has a limited sorption tendency. It is only partly removed in wastewater treatment plants and a substantial fraction reaches surface water such as rivers and lakes. It is of low toxicity and a low health hazard to humans although exhibiting some antiestrogenic properties. Benzotriazole (and tolyltriazole) is a common "polar organic persistent pollutant", often detected at >0.1 μg/L. One source of this pollution is their use in deicing agents in airports. Another source is dishwasher detergents, and some manufacturers are moving away from benzotriazole to address pollution concerns.

== Benzotriazole derivatives ==
Many modifications of benzotriazole have been reported. Alizapride is a commercial drug containing a benzotriazole ring system.

Tolyltriazole is a mixture of isomers or congeners that differ from benzotriazole by the addition of one methyl group attached somewhere on the benzene ring. Tolyltriazole has similar uses, but has higher solubility in some organic solvents.
