= Acylsilane =

Class of chemical compounds

The general structure of an acylsilane

Acylsilanes are a group of chemical compounds sharing a common functional group with the general structure RC(O)-SiR_{3}.

== Synthesis ==
Acylsilanes can be synthesized by treating acyl anion equivalents with silyl halides (typically trimethylsilyl chloride, tmsCl). Silylation of 2-lithio-1,3-dithiane, followed by hydrolysis of the dithioacetal group with mercury(II) chloride. Analogous methods has also been used to produce acylgermanes.

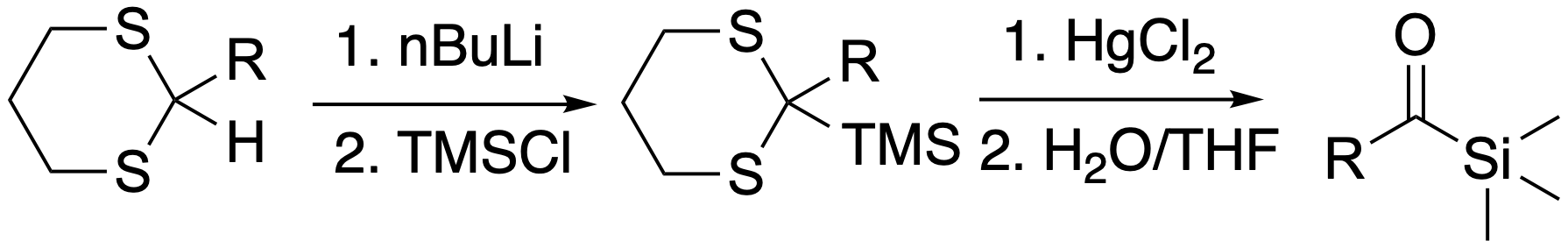
Brook acylsilane synthesis scheme.

Several approaches to acylsilanes start with carboxylic acid derivatives. Esters undergo reductive silylation en route to acylsilanes:

RCO_{2}Me + 2 tmsCl + Mg → RC(OMe)(Otms)(tms) + MgCl_{2}
RC(OMe)(Otms(tms) + → RC(O)tms + MeOtms

Tertiary amides react with silyl lithium reagents:

RCONR'_{2} + Litms → RC(O)tms + LiNR'_{2}

Acid chlorides are converted using hexamethyldisilane:

RCOCl + tms−tms → RC(O)tms + tmsCl

Some acyl silanes are prepared by oxidation of a suitable silanes.

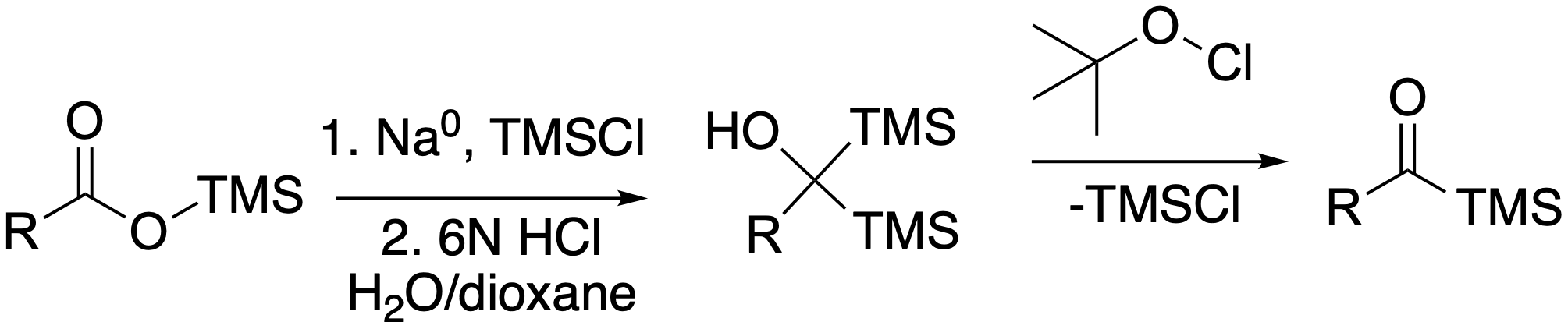
Kuwajima acylsilane synthesis, with the method to make the 1,1-bis(trimethylsilyl)alkan-1-ol.

== Reactions ==
Acylsilanes are starting compounds in the Brook rearrangement with vinyl lithium compounds to silyl enol ethers.

Acyl silanes and aryl bromides are coupling partners in Pd-catalyzed cross coupling reactions:
