= TMSI =

TMSI may refer to:

- Temporary Mobile Subscriber Identity, data sent between a mobile phone and its network
- Trimethylsilyl iodide, a chemical compound
