= Trimethylgermanium chloride =

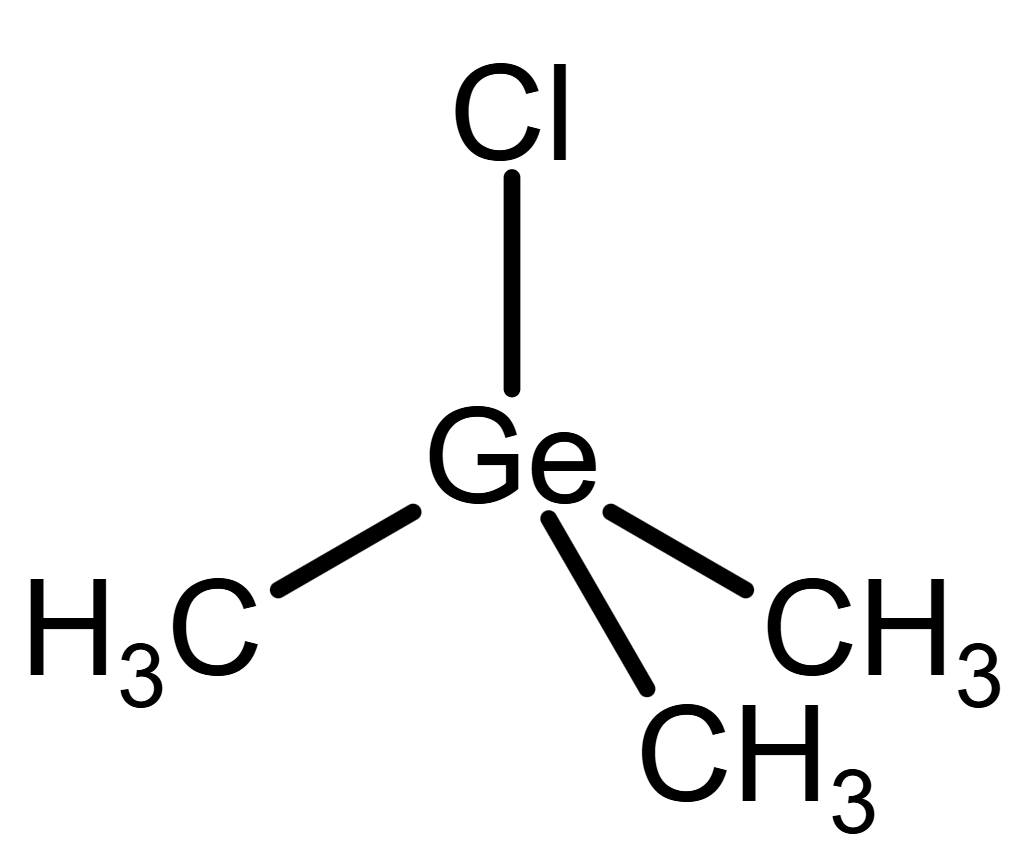

Names
- IUPAC name Chloro(trimethyl)germane
- Other names: Chlorotrimethylgermane; Trimethylchlorogermane

Identifiers
CAS Number	1529-47-1
3D model (JSmol)	Interactive image
ChemSpider	66366
ECHA InfoCard	100.014.741
EC Number	216-214-4
PubChem CID	73723
CompTox Dashboard (EPA)	DTXSID70165155
- InChI: InChI=1S/C3H9ClGe/c1-5(2,3)4/h1-3H3 Key: ZZBNZZCHSNOXOH-UHFFFAOYSA-N
- SMILES: Cl[Ge](C)(C)C

Properties
Chemical formula	(CH_{3})_{3}GeCl
Molar mass	153.19 g·mol^{−1}
Appearance	Colorless liquid
Density	1.24 g/cm^{3}
Melting point	−13 °C (9 °F; 260 K)
Boiling point	102 °C (216 °F; 375 K)
Solubility in water	Insoluble
Solubility	Miscible with diethyl ether, tetrahydrofuran, hexanes, benzene, dichloromethane and chloroform.
Refractive index (n_{D})	1.433

Structure
Molecular shape	Tetrahedral at Ge

Hazards
- Occupational safety and health (OHS/OSH)
Main hazards	Serious eye damage
- GHS labelling
Pictograms	(GHS02: Flammable) (GHS05: Corrosive)
Signal word	Danger
Hazard statements	H225, H314
Precautionary statements	P210, P233, P240, P241, P242, P243, P260, P264, P280, P301+P330+P331, P302+P361+P354, P303+P361+P353, P304+P340, P305+P354+P338, P316, P321, P363, P370+P378, P403+P235, P405, P501
NFPA 704 (fire diamond)	3 3 1
Flash point	1 °C (34 °F)

Related compounds
Related compounds	tert-Butyl chloride; Trimethylsilyl chloride; Trimethyltin chloride; Trimethyllead chloride
- Except where otherwise noted, data are given for materials in their standard state (at 25 °C [77 °F], 100 kPa). Infobox references

Trimethylgermanium chloride is an organogermanium compound with the chemical formula (CH_{3})_{3}GeCl. It is a colorless liquid.

== Synthesis ==
Trimethylgermanium chloride can be synthesized in high yield by reacting tetramethylgermanium with hydrogen chloride in the presence of aluminium trichloride as a catalyst.

Ge(CH_{3})_{4} + HCl → (CH_{3})_{3}GeCl + CH_{4}

It can also be synthesized by reaction of tetramethylgermanium with dimethylgermanium dichloride in a 1:1 molar ratio, with methylgermanium trichloride in a 2:1 molar ratio, or with germanium tetrachloride in a 3:1 molar ratio, in the presence of gallium trichloride as a catalyst.

Ge(CH_{3})_{4} + (CH_{3})_{2}GeCl_{2} → 2 (CH_{3})_{3}GeCl
2 Ge(CH_{3})_{4} + CH_{3}GeCl_{3} → 3 (CH_{3})_{3}GeCl
3 Ge(CH_{3})_{4} + GeCl_{4} → 4 (CH_{3})_{3}GeCl

== Uses ==
Trimethylgermanium chloride can be used to make trimethyl(2-thienyl)germane. It is also used as a methylating agent and precursor to prepare Grignard reagents in organic synthesis. It can be used as a precursor to germanium-masked dienolates for regioselective C-C bond formation, germanium enolates and α-germanate esters for aldol condensation reactions, Claisen rearrangements, and Peterson-type reactions.

== Reactions ==
Trimethylgermanium chloride is sensitive to moisture. It reacts slowly with water, producing trimethylgermanol and hydrogen chloride.

(CH_{3})_{3}GeCl + H_{2}O → (CH_{3})_{3}GeOH + HCl

It reacts with tris(trimethylsilyl)antimony to give tris(trimethylgermyl)antimony and trimethylsilyl chloride.

3 (CH_{3})_{3}GeCl + ((CH_{3})_{3}Si)_{3}Sb → ((CH_{3})_{3}Ge)_{3}Sb + 3 (CH_{3})_{3}SiCl

== Safety ==
When it burns, it releases toxic and irritating smoke and gases including carbon monoxide, carbon dioxide, hydrogen chloride, germanium monoxide and germanium dioxide.
