= Trimethylsilyl bromide =

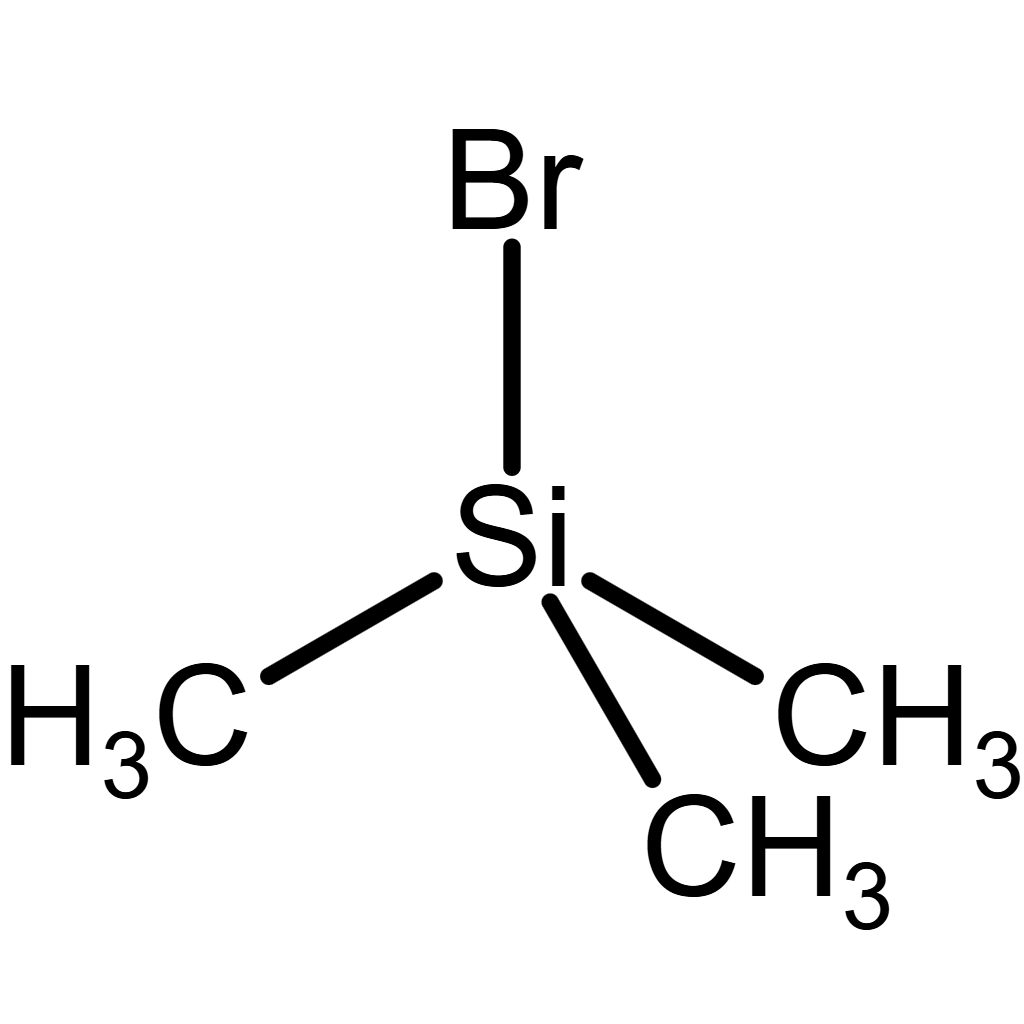

Names
- IUPAC name Bromo(trimethyl)silane
- Other names: Bromotrimethylsilane; TMSBr

Identifiers
CAS Number	2857-97-8
3D model (JSmol)	Interactive image
ChemSpider	68599
ECHA InfoCard	100.018.793
EC Number	220-672-0
PubChem CID	76113
UNII	JHH5G299BX
CompTox Dashboard (EPA)	DTXSID1062671
- InChI: InChI=1S/C3H9BrSi/c1-5(2,3)4/h1-3H3 Key: IYYIVELXUANFED-UHFFFAOYSA-N
- SMILES: Br[Si](C)(C)C

Properties
Chemical formula	(CH_{3})_{3}SiBr
Molar mass	153.094 g·mol^{−1}
Appearance	Colorless liquid
Density	1.16 g/cm^{3}
Melting point	−43 °C (−45 °F; 230 K)
Boiling point	79 °C (174 °F; 352 K)
Solubility in water	Reacts
Solubility	Soluble in carbon tetrachloride, chloroform, dichloromethane, 1,2-dichloroethane, toluene, hexanes Reactive with alcohols, ethers and esters.
Refractive index (n_{D})	1.4240

Hazards
- Occupational safety and health (OHS/OSH)
Main hazards	Causes severe skin burns and eye damage
- GHS labelling
Pictograms	(GHS02: Flammable) (GHS05: Corrosive) (GHS07: Exclamation mark) (GHS09: Environmental hazard)
Signal word	Danger
Hazard statements	H225, H226, H314, H410
Precautionary statements	P210, P233, P240, P241, P242, P243, P260, P264, P280, P301+P330+P331, P302+P361+P354, P303+P361+P353, P304+P340, P305+P354+P338, P316, P321, P363, P370+P378, P403+P235, P405, P501
NFPA 704 (fire diamond)	3 3 2
Flash point	32 °C

Related compounds
Related compounds	tert-Butyl bromide; Trimethylsilyl fluoride; Trimethylsilyl chloride; Trimethylsilyl iodide
- Except where otherwise noted, data are given for materials in their standard state (at 25 °C [77 °F], 100 kPa). Infobox references

Trimethylsilyl bromide is an organosilicon compound with formula (CH_{3})_{3}SiBr. It is a colorless liquid.

== Synthesis ==
Trimethylsilyl bromide can be synthesized by halogen exchange between trimethylsilyl chloride and either magnesium bromide in diethyl ether or sodium bromide in acetonitrile.

2 (CH_{3})_{3}SiCl + MgBr_{2} → 2 (CH_{3})_{3}SiBr + MgCl_{2}
(CH_{3})_{3}SiCl + NaBr → (CH_{3})_{3}SiBr + NaCl

It can also be synthesized by reaction between hexamethyldisilane and bromine in benzene, with no byproducts.

(CH_{3})_{3}Si−Si(CH_{3})_{3} + Br_{2} → 2 (CH_{3})_{3}SiBr

Trimethylsilyl bromide can be prepared in a laboratory scale from trimethylsilyl-4-bromo-2-alkenoates in almost quantitative yield.

It can also be synthesized by reaction of hexamethyldisiloxane and aluminium bromide.

== Characteristics ==
Trimethylsilyl bromide is a colorless liquid very sensitive to light, air and moisture. It fumes in air upon hydrolysis, producing hydrobromic acid. Upon prolonged storage it becomes yellow to orange because of releasing of bromine. Reacts violently with water.

== Uses ==
Trimethylsilyl bromide is used as a mild and selective reagent for cleavage of lactones, epoxides, acetals, phosphonate esters and certain ethers. It is effective reagent for formation of silyl enol ethers. Trimethylsilyl bromide is as a mild, stereoselective anomeric brominating agent. Stereoselective bromination of anomeric glycosyl acetates is achieved with trimethylsilyl bromide under mild conditions and in the presence of various protecting groups commonly employed in carbohydrate chemistry.
