= Trimethyltin hydroxide =

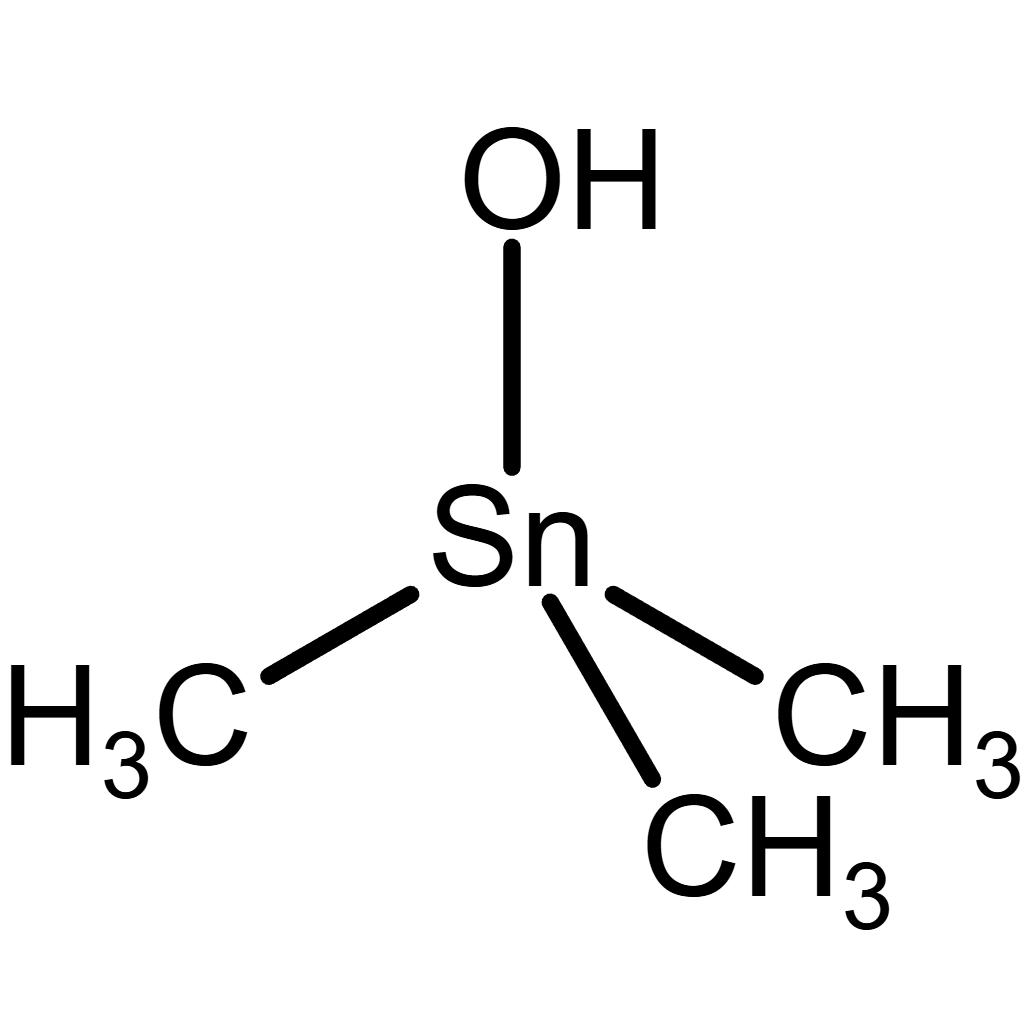

Names
- IUPAC name Trimethyltin hydroxide
- Other names: Hydroxytrimethylstannane; Hydroxytrimethyltin; Trimethylstannanol; Trimethylstannyl hydroxide

Identifiers
CAS Number	56-24-6
3D model (JSmol)	Interactive image
ChemSpider	21241881
ECHA InfoCard	100.202.818
EC Number	677-697-9
PubChem CID	11217597
UNII	10ALT8DJ2V
CompTox Dashboard (EPA)	DTXSID9032240
- InChI: InChI=1S/3CH3.H2O.Sn/h3*1H3;1H2;/q;;;;+1/p-1 Key: OJZNYUDKNVNEMV-UHFFFAOYSA-M
- SMILES: O[Sn](C)(C)C

Properties
Chemical formula	(CH_{3})_{3}SnOH
Molar mass	180.822 g·mol^{−1}
Appearance	White crystalline solid
Melting point	118 °C (244 °F; 391 K) (sublimes)
Solubility in water	Soluble
Solubility	Soluble in organic solvents

Hazards
- Occupational safety and health (OHS/OSH)
Main hazards	Highly toxic
- GHS labelling
Pictograms	(GHS06: Toxic) (GHS09: Environmental hazard)
Signal word	Danger
Hazard statements	H300, H310, H330, H410
Precautionary statements	P260, P262, P264, P270, P271, P273, P280, P284, P301+P316, P302+P352, P304+P340, P316, P320, P321, P330, P361+P364, P391, P403+P233, P405, P501

Related compounds
Related compounds	tert-Butyl alcohol; Trimethylsilanol
- Except where otherwise noted, data are given for materials in their standard state (at 25 °C [77 °F], 100 kPa). Infobox references

Trimethyltin hydroxide is an organotin compound with the chemical formula (CH_{3})_{3}SnOH. It is a white crystalline solid.

== Synthesis ==
Trimethyltin hydroxide can be synthesized by reaction of trimethyltin chloride with a strong base in methanol.

(CH_{3})_{3}SnCl + KOH → (CH_{3})_{3}SnOH + KCl

It can also be synthesized by hydrolysis of trimethyltin chloride and purification by sublimation.

== Structure ==
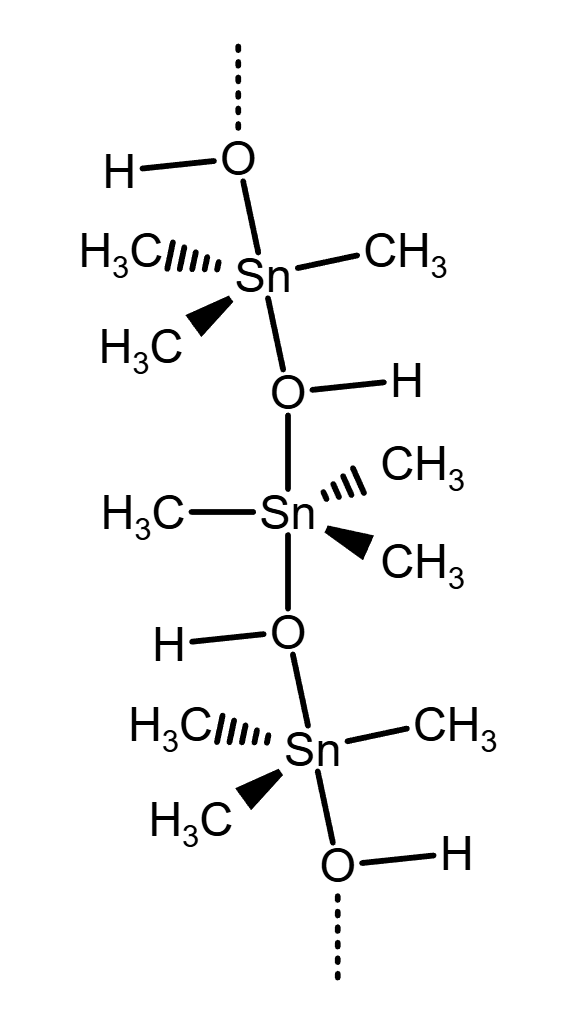
Structure of solid trimethyltin hydroxide.

Solid trimethyltin hydroxide is a coordination polymer. It forms orthorhombic crystals. The room temperature crystal structure of trimethyltin hydroxide comprises a total of 32 crystallographically independent (CH_{3})_{3}SnOH units arranged in four independent coordination polymer strands. Each strand is an infinite linear chain of (CH_{3})_{3}SnOH units, where in each unit Sn is approximately trigonal bipyramidal, surrounded by three methyl groups at the equator and two hydroxyl groups at the poles, where oxygens are shared between the units. The hydroxide groups play role as bridges between the units. Below 160 K (−113 °C; −172 °F) the crystal structure undergoes phase transition.

== Uses ==
Trimethyltin hydroxide is a reagent used for the cleavage of nonhindered alkyl esters. It is a method that is used for mild, efficient and selective hydrolysis of esters to produce corresponding carboxylic acids. Trimethyltin hydroxide is used in the synthesis of modified thymines, which is useful as inhibitors of RNase A. It reacts with 2,2-disubstituted benzothiazolines to produce trialkyltin derivatives of sulfur containing Schiff base complexes.
