= Chalconatronite =

Carbonate mineral

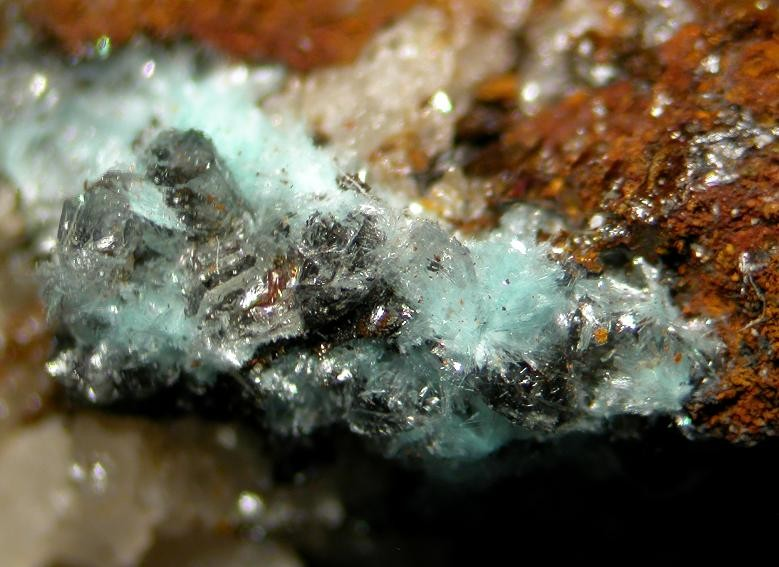
- Chalconatronite crystals found in Bastenberg Mine, Germany

General
- Category: Carbonate mineral
- Formula: Na_{2}[Cu(CO_{3})_{2}]·3H_{2}O
- IMA symbol: Chna
- Strunz classification: 5.CB.40
- Crystal system: Monoclinic

Identification
- Color: Blue-green, pale blue
- Mohs scale hardness: 1 to 2
- Streak: Pale blue-green
- Specific gravity: 2.27

Chalconatronite is a carbonate mineral and rare secondary copper mineral that contains copper, sodium, carbon, oxygen, and hydrogen, its chemical formula is Na_{2}[Cu(CO_{3})_{2}]·3H_{2}O. Chalconatronite is partially soluble in water, and only decomposes, although chalconatronite is soluble while cold, in dilute acids. The name comes from the mineral's compounds, copper ("chalcos" in Greek) and natron, naturally forming sodium carbonate. The mineral is thought to be formed by water carrying alkali carbonates (possibly from soil) reacting with bronze. Similar minerals include malachite, azurite, and other copper carbonates. Chalconatronite has also been found and recorded in Australia, Germany, and Colorado.

== Bronze Disease ==
Most chalconatronite formed on bronze and silver that have been treated with either sodium sesquicarbonate or sodium cyanide to prevent corrosion and bronze disease. The mineral has also been proven to form on the surface of copper artifacts after being treated with aqueous sodium carbonate. This formation by using sodium sesquicarbonate is undesirable by many antique collectors, as the mineral changes the patinas of copper artifacts. When the mineral forms, it can replace copper salts within the patina, and turn the color from a rich green to a blue-green or even black.

== Historical Occurrence ==
The mineral was recorded in 1955 on three bronze artifacts from ancient Egypt, which were being held in the Fogg Art Museum at Harvard. Chalconatronite was found inside of two bronze figures (one depicting a seated Sekhmet, and another one depicting a group of cats and kittens) from around the late Nubian Dynasty or early Saite Period. Another chalconatronite specimen was found under a bronze censer from the late Coptic Period. The chalconatronite found on the censer formed over cuprite and some atacamite crystals, which are associated minerals.

Chalconatronite was also found on iron and copper Roman armor in 1982 at a site in Chester, England. Some of the mineral was found on a copper pin in St. Mark's Basilica, Venice and in two different Mayan paintings. Along with pseudomalachite, chalconatronite was found on an illuminated manuscript from the sixteenth century. Synthetic chalconatronite could have possibly been made in ancient China as a form of pigment, named "synthetic malachite". It was made by taking copper oxide and boiling it with white alum in a "sufficient amount of water". After the result is cooled, a natron solution would be added to precipitate a synthetic form of chalconatronite, as sodium copper carbonate.

== See also ==
- Atacamite
- Cuprite
- Patina
- Botallackite
- Bronze disease
