= Trimethyltin chloride =

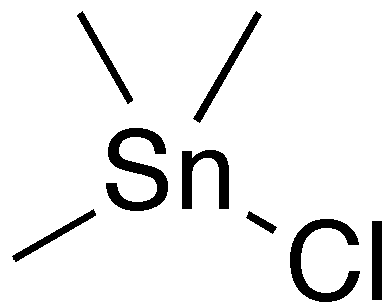

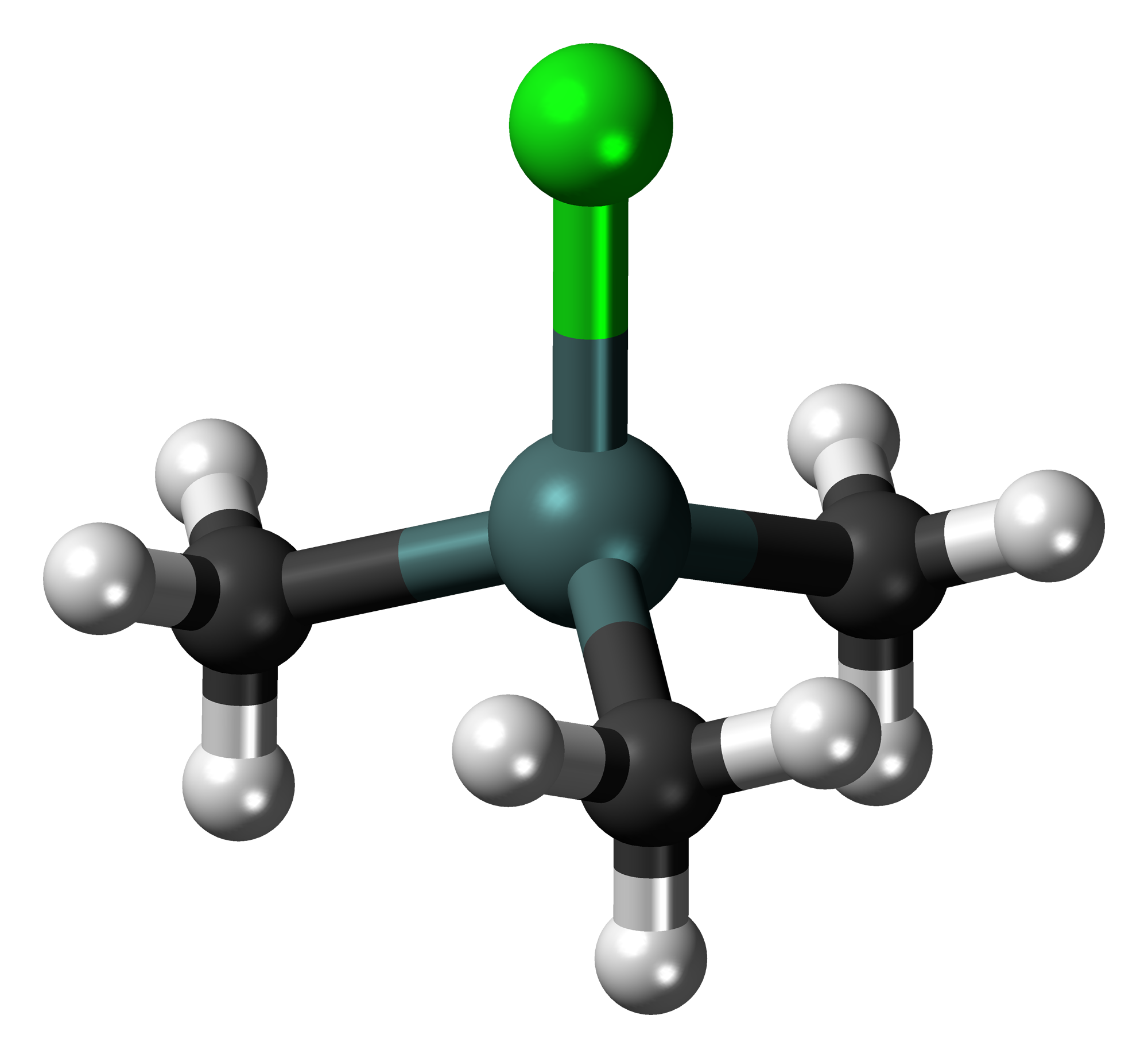

Names
- Preferred IUPAC name Chlorotri(methyl)stannane
- Other names: Chlorotrimethylstannane; Chlorotrimethyltin; Trimethyl chlorostannane; Trimethylchlorotin; Trimethylstannyl chloride; Trimethyltin chloride; Trimethyltin monochloride

Identifiers
CAS Number	1066-45-1
3D model (JSmol)	Interactive image
ChemSpider	13398
ECHA InfoCard	100.012.653
EC Number	213-917-8
PubChem CID	14016
UNII	9E3BCA3684
UN number	3146 2786
CompTox Dashboard (EPA)	DTXSID6042496
- InChI: InChI=1S/3CH3.ClH.Sn/h3*1H3;1H;/q;;;;+1/p-1 Key: KWTSZCJMWHGPOS-UHFFFAOYSA-M; InChI=1/3CH3.ClH.Sn/h3*1H3;1H;/q;;;;+1/p-1/rC3H9ClSn/c1-5(2,3)4/h1-3H3 Key: KWTSZCJMWHGPOS-KMTPXCBSAM
- SMILES: C[Sn](C)(C)Cl

Properties
Chemical formula	(CH_{3})_{3}SnCl
Molar mass	199.27 g·mol^{−1}
Appearance	White solid
Odor	Malodorous
Melting point	38.5 °C (101.3 °F; 311.6 K)
Boiling point	148 °C (298 °F; 421 K)

Hazards
- GHS labelling
Pictograms	(GHS06: Toxic) (GHS09: Environmental hazard)
Signal word	Danger
Hazard statements	H300, H310, H330, H410
Precautionary statements	P260, P262, P264, P270, P271, P273, P280, P284, P301+P310, P302+P350, P304+P340, P310, P320, P330, P361, P363, P391, P403+P233, P405
NFPA 704 (fire diamond)	4 1 0
Flash point	97 °C (207 °F; 370 K)
- Lethal dose or concentration (LD, LC)
LD_{50} (median dose)	12.6 mg/kg (oral, rat)
Safety data sheet (SDS)	External MSDS

Related compounds
Related compounds	tert-Butyl chloride; Trimethylsilyl chloride; Trimethylgermanium chloride; Trimethyllead chloride
- Except where otherwise noted, data are given for materials in their standard state (at 25 °C [77 °F], 100 kPa). verify (what is ?) Infobox references

Trimethyltin chloride is an organotin compound with the formula (CH_{3})_{3}SnCl. It is a white solid that is highly toxic and malodorous. It is susceptible to hydrolysis.

== Synthesis ==
Trimethyltin chloride can be prepared by the redistribution reaction of tetramethyltin with tin tetrachloride.

SnCl_{4} + 3 Sn(CH_{3})_{4} → 4 (CH_{3})_{3}SnCl

This redistribution reaction is typically performed with no solvent because high temperatures are required and purification is simplified.

A second route to (CH_{3})_{3}SnCl involves treating the corresponding hydroxide or oxide (in the following reaction, trimethyltin hydroxide (CH_{3})_{3}SnOH) with a halogenating agent such as hydrogen chloride or thionyl chloride (SOCl_{2}):

(CH_{3})_{3}SnOH + HCl → (CH_{3})_{3}SnCl + H_{2}O

== Uses ==
Trimethyltin chloride is used as a source of the trimethylstannyl group ((CH_{3})_{3}Sn−). For example, it is a precursor to vinyltrimethylstannane ((CH_{3})_{3}SnCH=CH_{2}) and indenyltrimethylstanane (CH_{3})_{3}SnC_{9}H_{7} (see Transition metal indenyl complex):

CH_{2}=CHMgBr + (CH_{3})_{3}SnCl → (CH_{3})_{3}SnCH=CH_{2} + MgBrCl
LiC_{9}H_{7} + (CH_{3})_{3}SnCl → (CH_{3})_{3}SnC_{9}H_{7} + LiCl

An example of an organolithium reagent reacting with (CH_{3})_{3}SnCl to form a tin-carbon bond is:

LiCH(Si(CH_{3})_{3})(Ge(CH_{3})_{3}) + (CH_{3})_{3}SnCl → (CH_{3})_{3}SnCH(Si(CH_{3})_{3})(Ge(CH_{3})_{3}) + LiCl

Organotin compounds derived from Me_{3}SnCl are useful in organic synthesis, especially in radical chain reactions. (CH_{3})_{3}SnCl is a precursor to compounds used in PVC stabilization. Reduction of trimethyltin chloride with sodium gives hexamethylditin:

2 Na + 2 (CH_{3})_{3}SnCl → (CH_{3})_{3}Sn−Sn(CH_{3})_{3} + 2 NaCl

== Toxicity ==
The ototoxicity of trimethyltin chloride in humans is not conclusively known. In guinea pigs, administered intraperitoneally, it is acutely and persistently ototoxic at 2 mg/kg (mechanisms may include damage to hair cells and vasculature of the cochlea), but in rats no such effect occurred.
