= Brook rearrangement =

Rearrangement in organic chemistry

(1,n) Brook rearrangement

In organic chemistry the Brook rearrangement refers to any [1,n] carbon to oxygen silyl migration. The rearrangement was first observed in the late 1950s by Canadian chemist Adrian Gibbs Brook (1924–2013), after which the reaction is named. These migrations can be promoted in a number of different ways, including thermally, photolytically or under basic/acidic conditions. In the forward direction, these silyl migrations produce silyl ethers as products which is driven by the stability of the oxygen-silicon bond.

The silyl substituents can be aliphatic or aromatic, and if the silicon is a center of chirality, the migration occurs with retention at this center. This migration occurs through a transition state where silicon is penta-coordinate and bears a partial negative charge. If a center of chirality is present at the carbon center to which the silyl group is attached, then inversion occurs at this center. As an example, if (trimethylsilyl)methanol were to be deprotonated, a [1,2]-Brook rearrangement would occur.

== Reaction mechanism ==
The reaction mechanism for this rearrangement depends on the conditions employed and the nature of the starting material. Anionic rearrangements are the most common Brook rearrangements observed. In the simplest case, proton abstraction from a nearby hydroxyl group generates an alkoxide. The alkoxide then displaces a methylene group from the nearby silicon atom; and a free proton quenches the methylene carbanion.

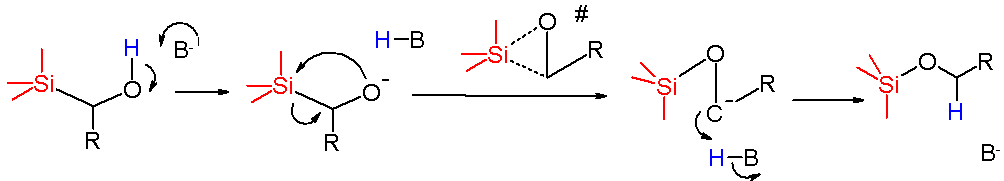
The Brook rearrangement reaction mechanism

A second category of anionic Brook rearrangements involves nucleophilic addition to a carbonyl group, generating an oxyanion β to the silicon atom. The reaction then proceeds much like the first category of Brook rearrangement, but the final fate of the carbanion often depends on the substrate in question. For example, attempting to perform a Wittig reaction on acylsilane results in the formation of a silyl enol ether instead of the expected alkene, due to elimination by the carbanion instead of protonation as seen above.

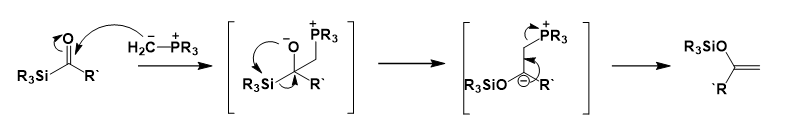

The proposed transition state for the nucleophilic displacement is a three-membered ring, with significant negative partial charge on the carbon atom and the silicon atom. This configuration is supported three ways:

- by Hammett sigma and rho studies.
- by the low activation energy and large negative entropy of activation, indicating a transition state considerably more ordered than the starting state.
- by retention of configuration at the silicon center, as demonstrated with a Walden Cycle (below). This supports a trigonal bipyramidal silicon, with one of the O or C axial and the other equatorial.

The proposed mechanism also proceeds with inversion at the carbon center.

=== Stereopreservation ===
The Brook rearrangement has been shown to occur with retention of configuration at the silicon center as demonstrated in the following Walden cycle:

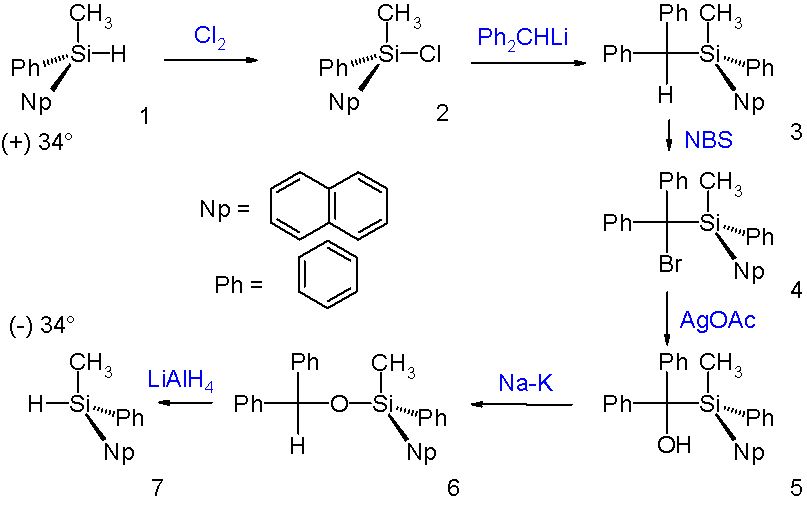
The Brook rearrangement Walden cycle

All steps in this cycle proceed with retention of configuration except for attack of the lithium reagent (which proceeded by inversion).

By starting with a chiral silicon of known configuration, the stereochemistry of the reaction could be determined by looking at the specific rotation of the recovered silane. Since it is known that attack by the lithium reagent proceeds with inversion, the recovered silane should be the opposite enantiomer of the starting silane (single inversion) if the Brook Rearrangement proceeds with retention, and the same enantiomer if the reaction proceeds with inversion (double inversion). Experimentally, the recovered silane was the opposite enantiomer, showing that the reaction occurred with retention at the silicon center.

== Scope ==
Brook rearrangements are common in acylsilanes. Beyond that, acylsilanes are well known for their hydrolysis in basic solution to a silanol and an aldehyde. This occurs through a Brook-rearrangement initiated by attack at the carbonyl group. A related reaction, involving initial attack at the silicon center, causes migration of one of the silicon groups to the carbonyl carbon, which initiates a Brook-Rearrangement. If the silicon group was chiral, the end product is a chiral silyl ether, as the migration occurs stereospecifically.

Rearrangements analogous to the Brook rearrangement are known for many other types of atoms. These include nitrogen, phosphorus, and sulfur as the nucleophilic component, with boron and germanium analogous known as the electrophilic component.

Brook rearrangements are known to be reversible. Depending on the relative stabilities of the carbanion and oxyanion formed, a silyl ether is perfectly capable of rearranging to a species with the silicon bonded to the carbon atom, and the free alcohol being present. This would be termed a retro-Brook rearrangement.
