= Trimethylsilyl chloride =

Organosilicon compound with the formula (CH3)3SiCl

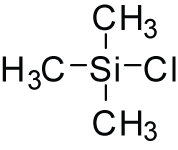
- TMSCl

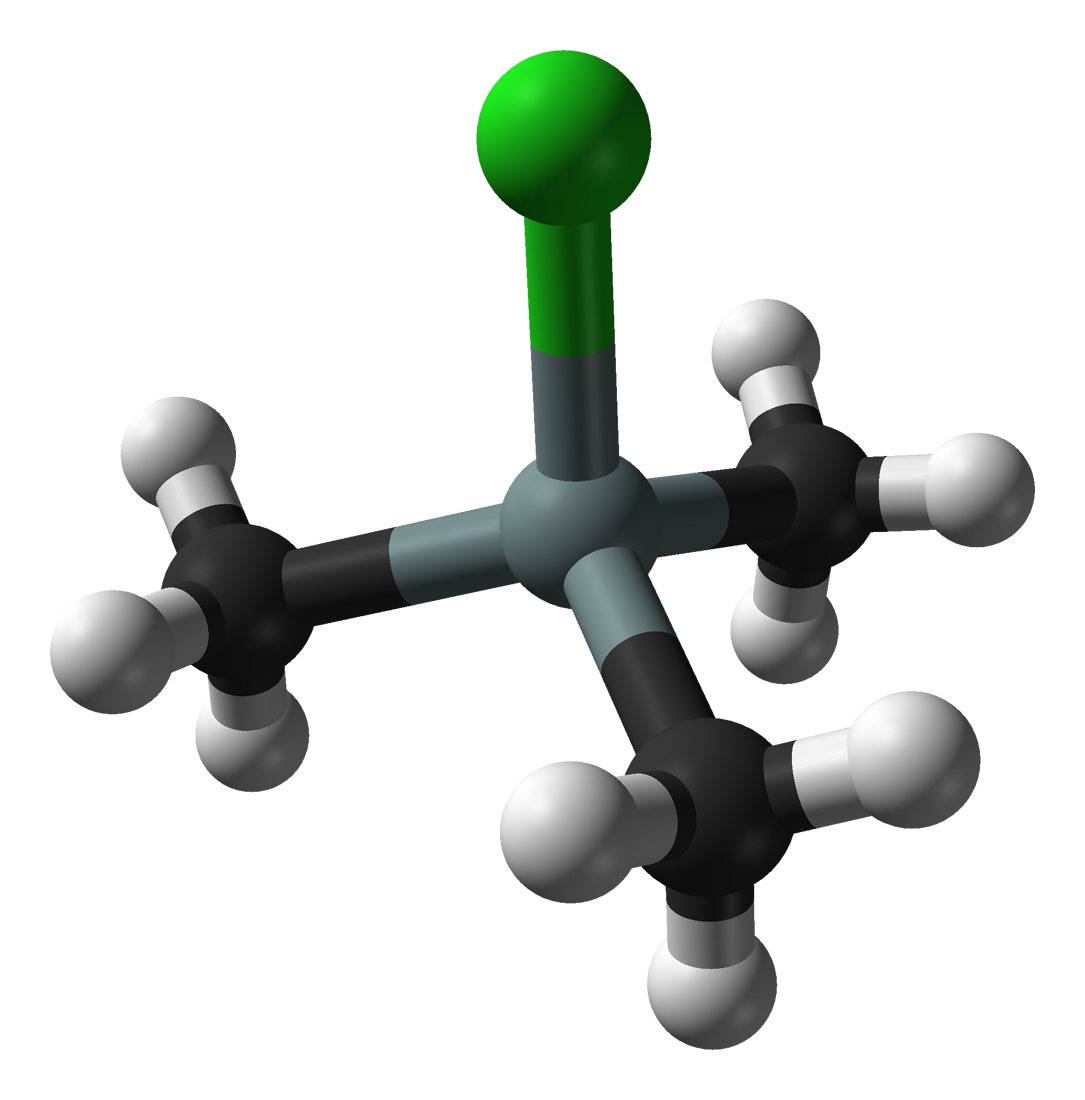
Ball-and-stick model of the trimethylsilyl chloride molecule
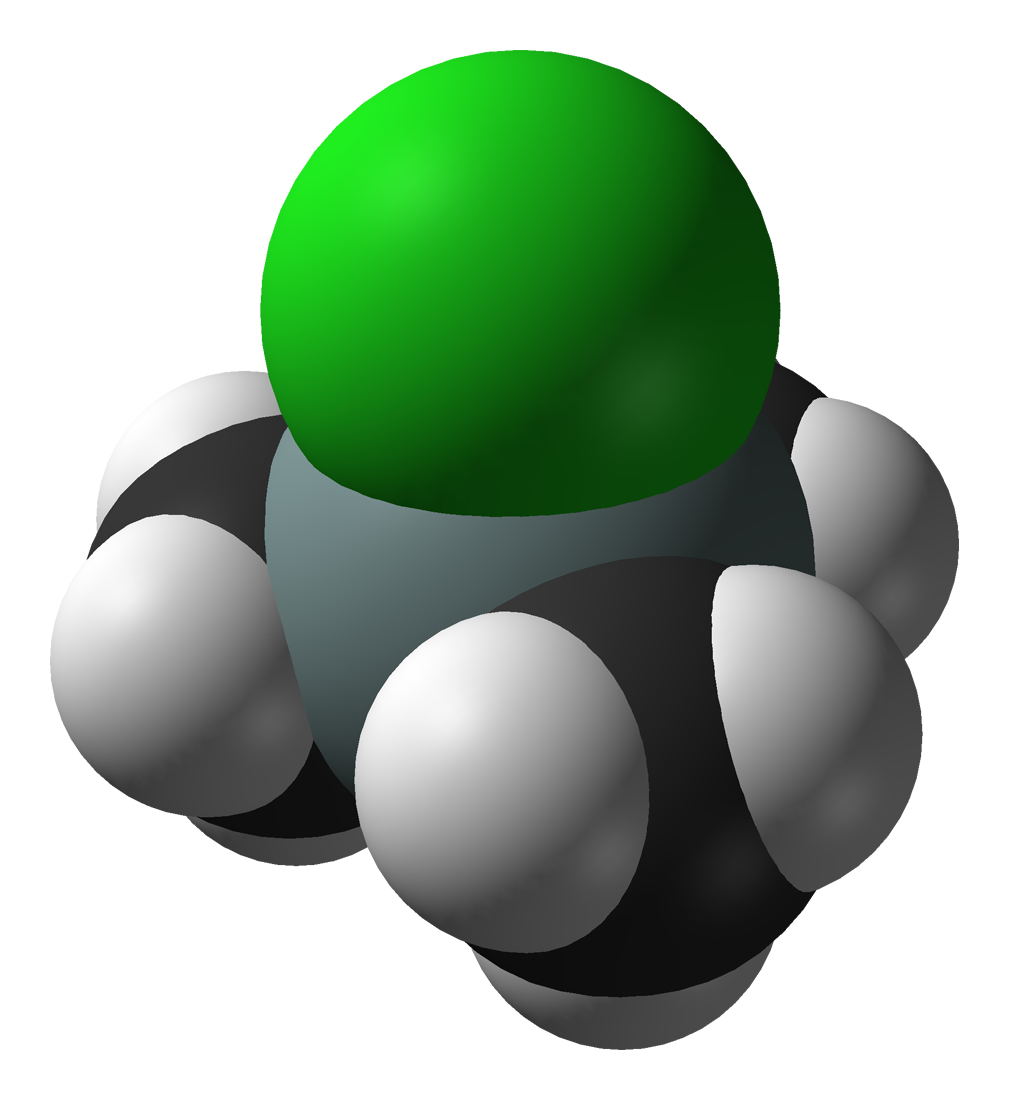
Space-filling model of the trimethylsilyl chloride molecule

Names
- Preferred IUPAC name Chlorotri(methyl)silane
- Other names Trimethylsilyl chloride Chlorotrimethylsilane; TMSCl; Trimethylchlorosilane; TMCS

Identifiers
CAS Number	75-77-4
3D model (JSmol)	Interactive image
ChemSpider	6157
ECHA InfoCard	100.000.819
EC Number	200-900-5
PubChem CID	6397
RTECS number	VV2710000
UNII	62UO4690X6
UN number	1298
CompTox Dashboard (EPA)	DTXSID2024822
- InChI: InChI=1S/C3H9ClSi/c1-5(2,3)4/h1-3H3 Key: IJOOHPMOJXWVHK-UHFFFAOYSA-N
- SMILES: C[Si](C)(C)Cl

Properties
Chemical formula	C_{3}H_{9}SiCl
Molar mass	108.64 g/mol
Appearance	Colorless liquid, fumes in moist air
Density	0.856 g/cm^{3}, liquid
Melting point	−40 °C (−40 °F; 233 K)
Boiling point	57 °C (135 °F; 330 K)
Solubility in water	Reacts
Magnetic susceptibility (χ)	−77.36·10^{−6} cm^{3}/mol

Structure
Molecular shape	Tetrahedral at Si

Hazards
- GHS labelling
Pictograms	(GHS02: Flammable) (GHS05: Corrosive) (GHS06: Toxic) (GHS07: Exclamation mark) (GHS08: Health hazard)
Signal word	Danger
Hazard statements	H225, H301, H312, H314, H331, H351
Precautionary statements	P201, P202, P210, P233, P240, P241, P242, P243, P260, P264, P270, P271, P280, P281, P301+P310, P301+P330+P331, P302+P352, P303+P361+P353, P304+P340, P305+P351+P338, P308+P313, P310, P311, P312, P321, P322, P330, P363, P370+P378, P403+P233, P403+P235, P405, P501
NFPA 704 (fire diamond)	3 3 2 W
Flash point	−28 °C (−18 °F; 245 K)
Autoignition temperature	400 °C (752 °F; 673 K)

Related compounds
Related halosilanes	Trimethylsilyl fluoride; Trimethylsilyl bromide; Trimethylsilyl iodide
Related compounds	tert-Butyl chloride; Trimethylgermanium chloride; Trimethyltin chloride; Trimethyllead chloride
- Except where otherwise noted, data are given for materials in their standard state (at 25 °C [77 °F], 100 kPa). verify (what is ?) Infobox references

Trimethylsilyl chloride, also known as chlorotrimethylsilane, is an organosilicon compound (silyl halide), with the formula (CH_{3})_{3}SiCl, often abbreviated Me_{3}SiCl or TMSCl. It is a colourless volatile liquid that is stable in the absence of water. It is widely used in organic chemistry.

== Preparation ==
TMSCl is prepared on a large scale by the direct process, the reaction of methyl chloride with a silicon-copper alloy. The principal target of this process is dimethyldichlorosilane, but substantial amounts of the trimethyl and monomethyl products are also obtained. The relevant reactions are (Me = methyl, CH_{3}):
$$x\ \ce{MeCl + Si} \longrightarrow \begin{cases}
\ce{Me3SiCl}, \\[2pt]
\ce{Me2SiCl2}, \\[2pt]
\ce{MeSiCl3},\\[2pt]
\text{etc.}
\end{cases}$$

Typically about 2–4% of the product stream is the monochloride, which forms an azeotrope with MeSiCl_{3}.

== Reactions and uses ==
TMSCl is reactive toward nucleophiles, resulting in the replacement of the chloride. In a characteristic reaction of TMSCl, the nucleophile is water, resulting in hydrolysis to give the hexamethyldisiloxane:
$$\ce{2 Me3SiCl + H2O  ->  Me3Si-O-SiMe3 + 2 HCl}$$
The related reaction of trimethylsilyl chloride with alcohols can be exploited to produce anhydrous solutions of hydrochloric acid in alcohols, which find use in the mild synthesis of esters from carboxylic acids and nitriles as well as, acetals from ketones. Similarly, trimethylsilyl chloride is also used to silanize laboratory glassware, making the surfaces more lipophilic.

=== Silylation in organic synthesis ===
By the process of silylation, polar functional groups such as alcohols and amines readily undergo reaction with trimethylsilyl chloride, giving trimethylsilyl ethers and trimethylsilyl amines. These new groups "protect" the original functional group by removing the labile protons and decreasing the basicity of the heteroatom. The lability of the Me_{3}Si−O and Me_{3}Si−N groups allow them to be easily removed afterwards ("deprotected"). Trimethylsilylation can also be used to increase the volatility of a compound, enabling gas chromatography of normally nonvolatile substances such as glucose.

Trimethylsilyl chloride also reacts with carbanions to give trimethylsilyl derivatives. Lithium acetylides react to give trimethylsilylalkynes such as bis(trimethylsilyl)acetylene. Such derivatives are useful protected forms of alkynes.

In the presence of triethylamine and lithium diisopropylamide, enolisable aldehydes, ketones and esters are converted to trimethylsilyl enol ethers. Despite their hydrolytic instability, these compounds have found wide application in organic chemistry; oxidation of the double bond by epoxidation or dihydroxylation can be used to return the original carbonyl group with an alcohol group at the alpha carbon. The trimethylsilyl enol ethers can also be used as masked enolate equivalents in the Mukaiyama aldol addition.

=== Dehydrations ===
Dehydration of metal chlorides with trimethylsilyl chloride in THF gives the solvate as illustrated by the case of chromium trichloride:
$$\ce{CrCl3 * 6 H2O  + 3 THF +  12 Me3SiCl  ->   CrCl3(THF)3  +  6 (Me3Si)2O  +  12 HCl}$$

=== Other reactions ===
Trimethylsilyl chloride is used to prepare other trimethylsilyl halides and pseudohalides, including trimethylsilyl fluoride, trimethylsilyl bromide, trimethylsilyl iodide, trimethylsilyl cyanide, trimethylsilyl azide, and trimethylsilyl trifluoromethanesulfonate (TMSOTf). These compounds are produced by a salt metathesis reaction between trimethylsilyl chloride and a salt of the (pseudo)halide (MX):
$$\ce{MX + Me3Si-Cl -> MCl + Me3Si-X}$$
TMSCl, lithium, and nitrogen molecule react to give tris(trimethylsilyl)amine, under catalysis by nichrome wire or chromium trichloride:
$$\ce{3 Me3SiCl  +  3 Li}  +  \tfrac{1}{2} \, \ce{N2  ->  (Me3Si)3N  +  3 LiCl}$$
Using this approach, atmospheric nitrogen can be introduced into organic substrate. For example, tris(trimethylsilyl)amine reacts with α,δ,ω-triketones to give tricyclic pyrroles.

Reduction of trimethylsilyl chloride give hexamethyldisilane:
$$\ce{2 Me3SiCl  +  2 Na  ->  2 NaCl  +  Me3Si-SiMe3}$$
