= Trimethyllead chloride =

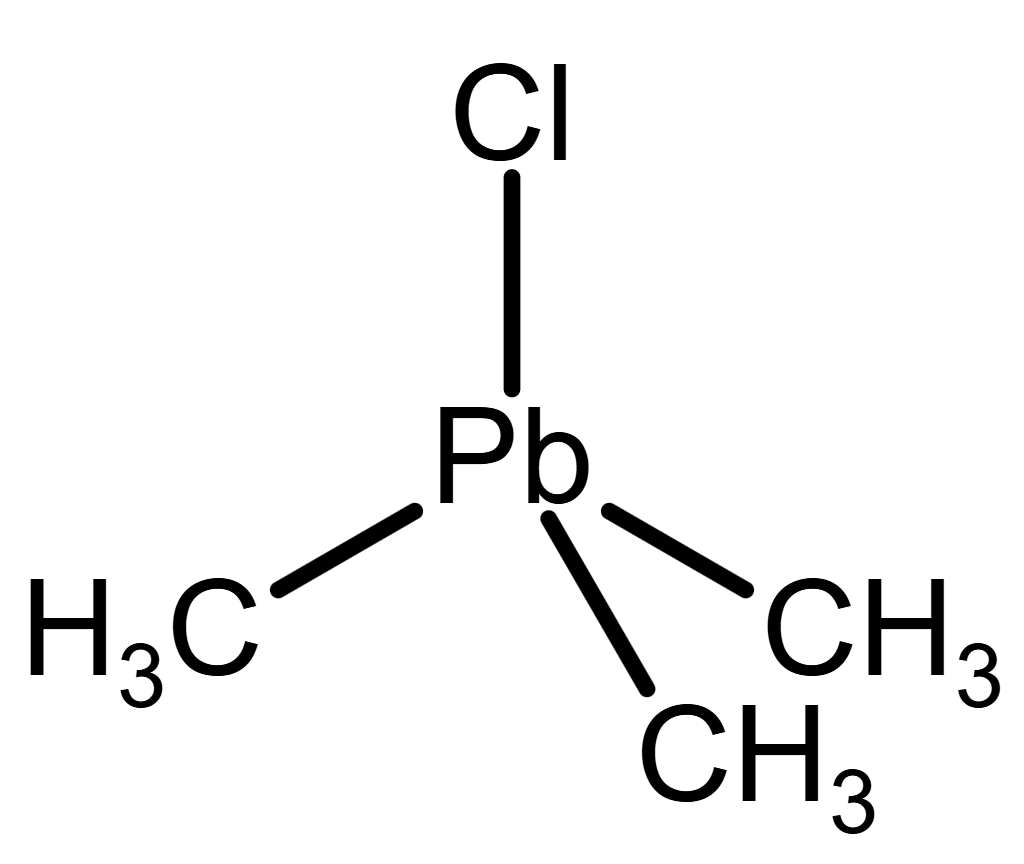

Names
- IUPAC name Chloro(trimethyl)plumbane
- Other names: Chlorotrimethylplumbane; Chlorotrimethyllead; Trimethylchlorolead; Trimethylchloroplumbane; Lead, chlorotrimethyl-

Identifiers
CAS Number	1520-78-1
3D model (JSmol)	Interactive image
ChemSpider	194572
ECHA InfoCard	100.014.716
EC Number	216-187-9
PubChem CID	223969
CompTox Dashboard (EPA)	DTXSID00858740
- InChI: InChI=1S/3CH3.ClH.Pb/h3*1H3;1H;/q;;;;+1/p-1 Key: HPQRSQFZILKRDH-UHFFFAOYSA-M
- SMILES: Cl[Pb](C)(C)C

Properties
Chemical formula	(CH_{3})_{3}PbCl
Molar mass	287.8 g·mol^{−1}
Appearance	Colorless liquid
Solubility in water	Limited
Solubility	Highly soluble in organic solvents

Hazards
- Occupational safety and health (OHS/OSH)
Main hazards	Highly toxic
- GHS labelling
Pictograms	(GHS06: Toxic) (GHS08: Health hazard) (GHS09: Environmental hazard)
Signal word	Danger

Related compounds
Related compounds	tert-Butyl chloride; Trimethylsilyl chloride; Trimethylgermanium chloride; Trimethyltin chloride
- Except where otherwise noted, data are given for materials in their standard state (at 25 °C [77 °F], 100 kPa). Infobox references

Trimethyllead chloride is an organolead compount with formula (CH_{3})_{3}PbCl. It is a highly toxic colorless liquid.

== Synthesis ==
Trimethyllead chloride can be synthesized by reacting tetramethyllead with hydrogen chloride.

Pb(CH_{3})_{4} + HCl → (CH_{3})_{3}PbCl + CH_{4}

== Uses ==
Trimethyllead chloride is primarily used in organic synthesis and as a reagent in various chemical reactions, particularly in the preparation of organolead compounds.

== Biochemistry ==
Trimethyllead chloride inhibits δ‐aminolevulinic acid dehydratase (ALAD) in vitro, although to a lesser extent than triethyllead chloride.

== Reactions ==
Trimethyllead chloride reacts with hexamethyldilead to yield tetramethyllead and lead(II) chloride.

== Hazards ==
As typical of organolead compounds, trimethyllead chloride is a poison. It is highly toxic to the environment, with long-lasting effects.
