= Tolyltriazole =

- 5-Methyl-1H-benzotriazole, one of the isomers in tolyltriazole

Names
- Other names _-Methyl-1H-benzotriazole (4, 5, 6, 7, mixture)

Identifiers
CAS Number	29385-43-1; 5-methyl: 136-85-6
3D model (JSmol)	4-methyl: Interactive image; 5-methyl: Interactive image
ChEBI	5-methyl: CHEBI:83455
ChEMBL	5-methyl: ChEMBL2148100
ChemSpider	4-methyl: 109219; 5-methyl: 8381
ECHA InfoCard	100.045.073
EC Number	5-methyl: 205-265-8
PubChem CID	5-methyl: 8705
UNII	O9DI72TU6U
CompTox Dashboard (EPA)	DTXSID0026171
- InChI: 4-methyl: InChI=1S/C7H7N3/c1-5-3-2-4-6-7(5)9-10-8-6/h2-4H,1H3,(H,8,9,10) Key: CMGDVUCDZOBDNL-UHFFFAOYSA-N; 5-methyl: InChI=1S/C7H7N3/c1-5-2-3-6-7(4-5)9-10-8-6/h2-4H,1H3,(H,8,9,10) Key: LRUDIIUSNGCQKF-UHFFFAOYSA-N
- SMILES: 4-methyl: Cc1cccc2[nH]nnc12; 5-methyl: Cc1ccc2nn[nH]c2c1

Properties
Chemical formula	C_{7}H_{7}N_{3}
Molar mass	133.154 g·mol^{−1}

Hazards
- GHS labelling
Pictograms	(GHS07: Exclamation mark) (GHS09: Environmental hazard)
Signal word	Warning

Related compounds
Related compounds	Benzotriazole
- Except where otherwise noted, data are given for materials in their standard state (at 25 °C [77 °F], 100 kPa). Infobox references

Tolyltriazole is a mixture of isomers or congeners that differ from benzotriazole by the addition of one methyl group attached somewhere on the benzene ring. "The term tolyltriazole (CAS 29385-43-1) generally [refers to] the commercial mixture composed of approximately equal amounts of 4- and 5-methylbenzotriazole, with small quantities of [their respective 7- and 6-methyl tautomers]".

== Synthesis and reactions ==
Synthesis is much like that of benzotriazole, but starting with methyl-o-phenylenediamine instead of o-phenylenediamine. Isomers of methyl-o-phenylenediamine include 3-methyl-o-phenylenediamine, 4-methyl-o-phenylenediamine, and N-methyl-o-phenylenediamine (not involved here).

== Applications ==
Tolyltriazole has uses similar to benzotriazole, but has better solubility in some organic solvents.

== Environmental relevance ==
Tolyltriazole (and benzotriazole) is a common "polar organic persistent pollutant", often detected at >0.1 μg/L.

== Related compounds ==
Hydroxybenzotriazole
