= Trimethylsilyl fluoride =

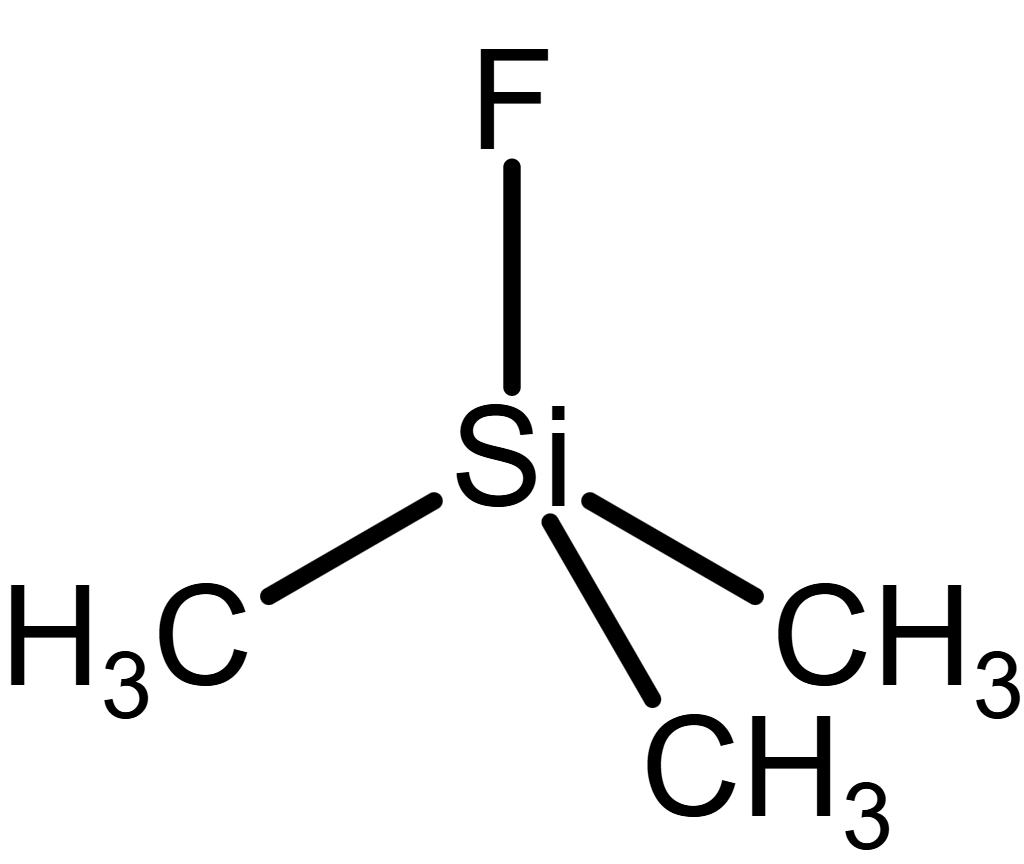

Names
- IUPAC name Fluoro(trimethyl)silane
- Other names: Trimethylsilyl fluoride; Trimethylfluorosilane; Fluorotrimethylsilane; TMSF

Identifiers
| CAS Number | 420-56-4 |
| 3D model (JSmol) | Interactive image |
| ChemSpider | 9485 |
| ECHA InfoCard | 100.006.362 |
| EC Number | 206-997-0 |
| PubChem CID | 9869 |
| CompTox Dashboard (EPA) | DTXSID5059959 |
- InChI: InChI=1S/C3H9FSi/c1-5(2,3)4/h1-3H3 Key: CTIKAHQFRQTTAY-UHFFFAOYSA-N
- SMILES: F[Si](C)(C)C

Properties
| Chemical formula | (CH_{3})_{3}SiF |
| Molar mass | 92.188 g·mol^{−1} |
| Appearance | Colorless gas |
| Density | 0.793 g/cm^{3} at 0 °C |
| Melting point | −74 °C (−101 °F; 199 K) |
| Boiling point | 16 °C (61 °F; 289 K) |
| Solubility in water | Reacts |
| Solubility | Soluble in most organic solvents, except the protic ones with which it reacts. |

Hazards
- Occupational safety and health (OHS/OSH)
| Main hazards | Skin burns and serious eye damage |
- GHS labelling
| Pictograms | (GHS02: Flammable) (GHS04: Compressed Gas) (GHS07: Exclamation mark) |
| Signal word | Danger |
| Hazard statements | H224, H280, H315, H319, H335 |
| Precautionary statements | P210, P233, P240, P241, P242, P243, P261, P264, P264+P265, P271, P280, P302+P352, P303+P361+P353, P304+P340, P305+P351+P338, P319, P321, P332+P317, P337+P317, P362+P364, P370+P378, P403+P233, P403+P235, P405, P410+P403, P501 |
| Flash point | -30 °C |

Related compounds
| Related compounds | Trimethylsilyl chloride; Trimethylsilyl bromide; Trimethylsilyl iodide |
- Except where otherwise noted, data are given for materials in their standard state (at 25 °C [77 °F], 100 kPa). Infobox references

Trimethylsilyl fluoride is an organosilicon compound with the formula (CH_{3})_{3}SiF. It is a colorless gas.

== Synthesis ==
Trimethylsilyl fluoride can be synthesized from trimethylsilyl chloride and potassium fluoride in the presence of a phase-transfer catalyst and a few drops of water. It can also be synthesized by the reaction of trimethylsilyl trifluoromethanesulfonate with potassium fluoride in dimethylformamide containing 18-crown-6 ether. It can be synthesized from trimethylsilyl chloride by treatment with hydrogen fluoride.

(CH_{3})_{3}SiCl + HF → (CH_{3})_{3}SiF + HCl

It can also be generated in situ by reaction of ethyl trimethylsilylacetate and tetra-n-butylammonium fluoride.

== Uses ==
Trimethylsilyl fluoride is used as a protecting group during synthesis of certain chemicals and during certain reactions (e.g. silylation). Its applications are in pharmaceutical industry and organic synthesis.

== Reactions ==
Trimethylsilyl fluoride reacts with norbornyllithium to give trimethylsilylnorbornane. Trimethylsilyl fluoride can silylate ketones, alcohols, and terminal alkynes.

== Safety ==
Trimethylsilyl fluoride is a dermatotoxin. Cause skin, eye and respiratory system irritation. It causes skin burns and serious eye damage. It can cause chemical pneumonitis. It is extremely flammable and its vapors can form explosive mixtures with air.
