= Trimethylsilyl iodide =

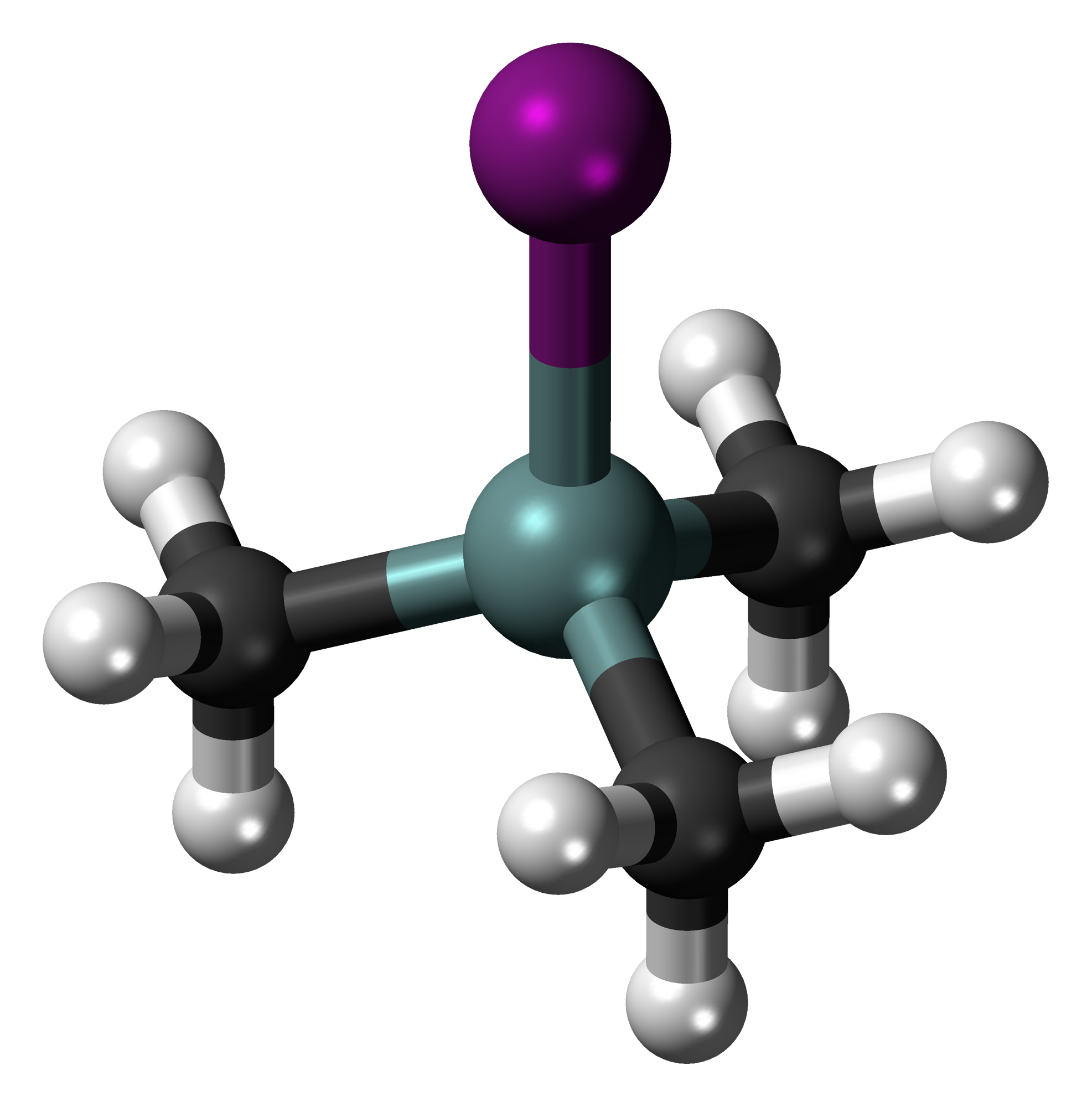

Names
- Preferred IUPAC name Iodotri(methyl)silane
- Other names Iodotrimethylsilane; TMSI; TMS-I; Jung reagent

Identifiers
CAS Number	16029-98-4
3D model (JSmol)	Interactive image
ChemSpider	76879
ECHA InfoCard	100.036.503
PubChem CID	85247
UNII	7A65KRZ6NV
CompTox Dashboard (EPA)	DTXSID4065997
- InChI: InChI=1S/C3H9ISi/c1-5(2,3)4/h1-3H3 Key: CSRZQMIRAZTJOY-UHFFFAOYSA-N; InChI=1/C3H9ISi/c1-5(2,3)4/h1-3H3 Key: CSRZQMIRAZTJOY-UHFFFAOYAB
- SMILES: I[Si](C)(C)C

Properties
Chemical formula	C_{3}H_{9}ISi
Molar mass	200.094 g·mol^{−1}
Appearance	Clear colorless liquid
Density	1.406 g/mL
Boiling point	106–109 °C (223–228 °F; 379–382 K)

Hazards
Flash point	−31 °C (−24 °F; 242 K)

Related compounds
Related compounds	Trimethylsilyl fluoride; Trimethylsilyl chloride; Trimethylsilyl bromide
- Except where otherwise noted, data are given for materials in their standard state (at 25 °C [77 °F], 100 kPa). Infobox references

Trimethylsilyl iodide (iodotrimethylsilane or TMSI) is an organosilicon compound with the chemical formula (CH_{3})_{3}SiI. It is a colorless, volatile liquid at room temperature.

== Preparation ==
Trimethylsilyl iodide may be prepared by the oxidative cleavage of hexamethyldisilane by iodine or by the cleavage of hexamethyldisiloxane with aluminium triiodide.

(CH_{3})_{3}Si−Si(CH_{3})_{3} + I_{2} → 2 (CH_{3})_{3}SiI
3 (CH_{3})_{3}Si−O−Si(CH_{3})_{3} + 2 AlI_{3} → 6 (CH_{3})_{3}SiI + Al_{2}O_{3}

== Applications ==
Trimethylsilyl iodide is used to introduce the trimethylsilyl group onto alcohols (ROH):

R−OH + (CH_{3})_{3}SiI → R−O−Si(CH_{3})_{3} + HI

This type of reaction may be useful for gas chromatography analysis; the resultant silyl ether is more volatile than the underivatized original materials. However, for the preparation of bulk trimethylsilylated material, trimethylsilyl chloride may be preferred due to its lower cost.

TMSI reacts with alkyl ethers (ROR′), forming silyl ethers (ROSi(CH_{3})_{3}) and iodoalkanes (RI) that can be hydrolyzed to alcohols (ROH).

Trimethylsilyl iodide is also used for the removing of the Boc protecting group, especially where other deprotection methods are too harsh for the substrate.
