= Tetramethylgermanium =

Names
- IUPAC name Tetramethylgermane
- Other names: Germane, tetramethyl-; Germanium, tetramethyl-; Tetramethyl germanium; Tetra-methyl-germanium; TMG

Identifiers
CAS Number	865-52-1
3D model (JSmol)	Interactive image
ChEBI	CHEBI:231506
ChemSpider	63268
ECHA InfoCard	100.011.587
EC Number	212-745-0
PubChem CID	70079
CompTox Dashboard (EPA)	DTXSID70235600
- InChI: InChI=1S/C4H12Ge/c1-5(2,3)4/h1-4H3 Key: ZRLCXMPFXYVHGS-UHFFFAOYSA-N
- SMILES: C[Ge](C)(C)C

Properties
Chemical formula	Ge(CH_{3})_{4}
Molar mass	132.770 g·mol^{−1}
Appearance	Colorless oily liquid
Odor	Sweetish, chloroform-like
Density	0.978 g/cm^{3}
Melting point	−88 °C (−126 °F; 185 K)
Boiling point	43.4 °C (110.1 °F) at 987 hPa
Solubility	Soluble in ethanol, diethyl ether
Vapor pressure	464.572 hPa at 20 °C (68 °F); 1458.51 hPa at 55 °C (131 °F)
Refractive index (n_{D})	1.389 at 20 °C (68 °F)

Structure
Molecular shape	Tetrahedral at Ge and C

Hazards
- Occupational safety and health (OHS/OSH)
Main hazards	Toxic, flammable, can cause serious eye damage
- GHS labelling
Pictograms	(GHS02: Flammable) (GHS07: Exclamation mark)
Signal word	Danger
Hazard statements	H225, H302, H312, H319, H332
Precautionary statements	P210, P233, P240, P241, P242, P243, P261, P264, P264+P265, P270, P271, P280, P301+P317, P302+P352, P303+P361+P353, P304+P340, P305+P351+P338, P317, P321, P330, P337+P317, P362+P364, P370+P378, P403+P235, P501
Flash point	−37 °C (−35 °F)

Related compounds
Related compounds	Neopentane; Tetramethylsilane; Tetramethyltin; Tetramethyllead
- Except where otherwise noted, data are given for materials in their standard state (at 25 °C [77 °F], 100 kPa). Infobox references

Tetramethylgermanium or tetramethylgermane is an organogermanium compound with the chemical formula Ge(CH_{3})_{4}, often abbreviated as GeMe_{4}, where Me stands for methyl. It is a colorless liquid. It is the simplest tetraorganogermane.

== Synthesis ==
Tetramethylgermanium can be synthesized by reaction between germanium tetrachloride and a Grignard reagent methylmagnesium chloride in diethyl ether.

GeCl_{4} + 4 CH_{3}MgCl → Ge(CH_{3})_{4} + 4 MgCl_{2}

Tetramethylgermanium can also be synthesized by reaction between germanium tetrachloride and dimethylzinc or dimethylcadmium. The latter is more easily separated from the resulting product due to its higher boiling point. The reaction proceeds almost quantitatively at room temperature.

GeCl_{4} + 2 Zn(CH_{3})_{2} → Ge(CH_{3})_{4} + 2 ZnCl_{2}

Tetramethylgermanium can be also synthesized by heating germanium with methyl chloride in the presence of copper.

Ge + 4 CH_{3}Cl + 2 Cu → Ge(CH_{3})_{4} + 2 CuCl_{2}

== Characteristics ==
Tetramethylgermanium is a colorless oily liquid with a sweetish odor, similar to chloroform. It dissolves without decomposition in ethanol and diethyl ether. It reacts slowly with nitric acid at 0 °C.

== Structure ==
The tetramethylgermanium molecule is tetrahedral at the germanium and carbon atoms. The germanium atom is connected to four methyl groups by a single bond in a tetrahedral fashion, thus, tetramethylgermanium is a heavy analog of neopentane, where the central carbon atom is replaced by germanium.

== Uses ==
Tetramethylgermanium is useful as a NMR chemical shift reference compound and in production of thin films composed of germanium element and germanium-containing polymers using plasma polymerization technique. The colorless polymer films formed from tetramethylgermanium were investigated by elemental analysis and infrared spectroscopy. Those polymers contain −CH_{3}, −CH_{2}−, Ge−CH_{3}, Ge−O−C, and Ge−O−Ge groups and germanium element. Most Ge species present at the outermost layers of the films are oxidized by air, while the Ge species at the inner layers exist as germanium element.

Tetramethylgermanium can be used as a methylating agent in transmetallation reactions. The following reaction should be done below 20 °C (68 °F):

Ge(CH_{3})_{4} + GaCl_{3} → (CH_{3})_{3}GeCl + CH_{3}GaCl_{2}

== Safety ==
Upon contact with eyes, tetramethylgermanium can cause serious eye damage and serious eye irritation. It is harmful in contact with skin, causing skin irritation. It is a neurotoxin. It is flammable. Its vapors may form explosive mixtures with air. Vapors of tetramethylgermanium are heavier than air and may spread along floors. While it burns, it releases toxic and irritating smoke and gases containing germanium oxides, carbon monoxide and carbon dioxide.
