= Bronze disease =

Effect of chlorides on copper alloys

Bronze disease is an irreversible and nearly inexorable corrosion process that occurs when chlorides come into contact with bronze or other copper-bearing alloys. It can occur as either a dark green coating or a much lighter whitish fuzzy or furry green coating. It is not a bacterial infection, but the result of a chemical reaction with the chlorides that usually occurs by contamination of the bronze object by saltwater or burial in specific types of soil where chloride salts are present. If not treated, it may destroy the affected artifact, but treatment is very difficult, costly, and not always effective. Transfer of chlorides from the contaminated artifact to other artifacts can spread the condition.

== Description ==
Bronze disease is the chloride corrosion of cuprous (copper-based) artifacts. It was originally thought to be caused by bacteria. It is contagious in that the chlorides which cause it can spread the condition if they are brought into contact with another cuprous object. Despite its name, bronze disease can affect any copper-bearing alloy, not just bronze. It is not reserved for antique objects but can affect contemporary metals like modern cupro-nickel coins.

Bronze disease ranges from vivid green to pastel green. It is commonly present in all colors in this range due to the series of reactions that causes it and there may also be tiny, possibly microscopic, blue crystals. Bronze disease typically affects isolated patches of the object in severe cases being a visibly and tactilely raised bloom of microscopic crystals as well as being associated with pitting. The patches of bronze disease can be scraped off the surface using a fingernail or a wooden pick. These properties are all in comparison with verdigris, which is normally a duller shade, uniform across the whole of the affected object, and cannot be scratched off with wood or fingernails. Unlike bronze disease, verdigris serves to protect the metal.

As it relies upon the presence of chlorides, water, and oxygen, the absence of one of these three halts the progress, although any damage done is irreversible. Treatment for the condition typically involves physical removal of the chlorides (through scrubbing), chemical or electrochemical removal, and then isolating the object from oxygen, water, and future chloride contamination using an airtight container or a wax coating. These treatments may also remove any patina, loss of which is often seen as undesirable to collectors and conservators but is preferable to loss of the object.

Bronze disease is common or even ubiquitous on artefacts recovered from a marine environment due to the presence of chlorides in seawater. Coastal areas may also be hazardous due to salt carried in the atmosphere as well as the humidity. Absence of dissolved chlorides and oxygen in the soil means buried objects may not be affected while interred (similarly, lack of soluble salts and oxygen means that buried metals may not develop a patina or that oxidation of the metal may be reversed). When an artefact is recovered, surface encrustations may hide and/or protect bronze disease.

Chlorides may occur in or on the metal due to contamination from soil, water (especially seawater), the atmosphere, human sweat, or be present as impurities when the object was created. In many cases chlorides may be present within the interior of the artefact; the disease may reoccur if not isolated from water and/or oxygen.

== Reaction ==
Initially, copper is oxidized to the cuprous ion: (1) Cu → Cu^{+} + e^{−}

The cuprous ion reacts with the chloride ion to form the insoluble white colored salt cuprous chloride: (2) Cu^{+} + Cl^{−} → CuCl

The cuprous chloride reacts with atmospheric moisture and oxygen to form a green cupric chloride/cupric hydroxide compound and hydrochloric acid: (3) 4 CuCl + 4 H_{2}O + O_{2} → CuCl_{2}·3 Cu(OH)_{2} + 2 HCl

The remaining copper is oxidised by air to the cuprous ion: (4) Cu → Cu^{+} + e^{−}

The cuprous ion reacts with the chloride ion in the hydrochloric acid to form the insoluble white colored salt cuprous chloride: (5) Cu^{+} + Cl^{−} → CuCl

The reaction then repeats from equation (3). It is the presence of two different white and green salts that lead to the fuzzy green appearance.

== Treatment ==
Initial treatment can involve placing the object in a desiccating environment. Deprived of water, the reaction cannot continue. However, re-exposure of the object to even atmospheric water can restart the process. Bronze disease remains an active area of research within object conservation.

=== Surface ===
Formation of harmless unidentified sodium carbonate crystals on an ancient Roman bronze coin that has been treated in carbonate solution for bronze disease for four weeks and has been removed and rinsed several times. Video has been accelerated to ten times normal speed.

Removal of the chlorides is essential. In practice this first involves physical cleaning (with a wooden or even metal pick) to remove the bulk of the chlorides and then chemical treatment. One chemical treatment is soaking the object in a 5% sodium sesquicarbonate solution. This serves to neutralize the acid that attacks the metal as well as converting the reactive cuprous chloride to largely inert cuprous oxide. The oxide may coat the artefact with unsightly but harmless black spots or generally darken the metal.

The duration of soaking may be days to weeks or even a year for severely contaminated objects. The sesquicarbonate may remove copper from the artefact as it forms a complex ion with copper. Amateurs report that the patina may be stripped from the artefact but this is when the solution is boiled so that the carbonate rinse removes the chlorides in hours rather than the cool bath of long duration used by professional conservators.

Soaking in sodium carbonate—which does not form a complex ion with copper and is unlikely to affect the patina but is slower than the sesquicarbonate—or benzotriazole aqueous solutions may also be used. The carbonate is similar in effect to the sesquicarbonate. The benzotriazole does not remove the chlorides or neutralize the acid present but acts as a physical barrier to water, oxygen, and chlorides and so can be used as a final step in all cases but as a first or only step in only minor cases.

Use of tap water for initial carbonate rinses is fine as any chloride content in the water is low compared to the content found when the chlorides from the contaminated artefact have dissolved into the water. Later rinses should be with distilled water though the chlorine of a chlorinated town water supply is likely to have evaporated from tap water inside 24 hours and therefore will not further contaminate the object.

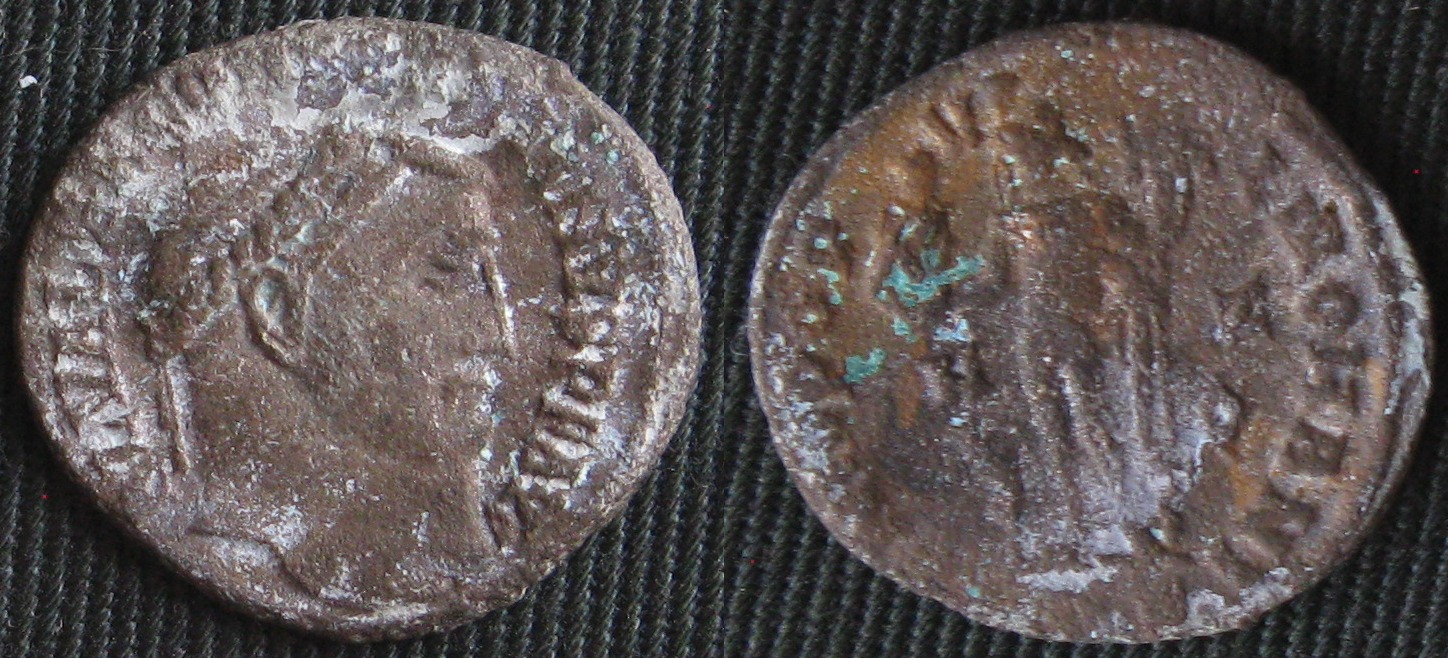
Unidentified sodium carbonate crystals (white) formed on the same Roman coin treated for bronze disease. The green masses on the coin's reverse are a copper carbonate which formed in the region where the bronze disease was most prevalent. It will be physically removed to ensure that the chlorides have also been removed prior to further conservation efforts. The photos were taken some 20 minutes after rinsing and surface drying.

Instead of rinses, electrolysis may be used, often with sodium carbonate as the electrolyte and mild or stainless steel as the anode. This converts the cuprous ions to elemental copper. Elemental copper released from the chlorides may be redeposited on the artefact as a pinkish coating. A coin may take only hours, whereas a large artefact, such as a cannon, may take months.

Once treated, the specimen should be held in a dry environment and periodically inspected for recurrence of bronze disease as no long-term treatment has been confirmed.

=== Internal ===
If chloride ions have penetrated beyond the surface more rigorous treatment is required.

This typically involves soaking in acetone to displace any water in the specimen. Then soaking in a benzotriazole (BTA)–ethanol solution to chelate the copper and make it unreactive. Pits and holes may be filled with zinc powder, which is then painted over with shellac coloured to look like the specimen.

== Prevention ==
Waxes prepared with BTA are available commercially, the idea being that the BTA will prevent any reaction by chelating the surface copper and the wax acting as a physical barrier reducing exposure to water, oxygen, and chlorides; but coating an infected object with wax will not stop the problem. Storing the object in a completely dry or oxygen free environment will also prevent bronze disease as will isolation from contact with chlorides.
