= Hexamethyldisilane =

- Skeletal formula of hexamethyldisilane

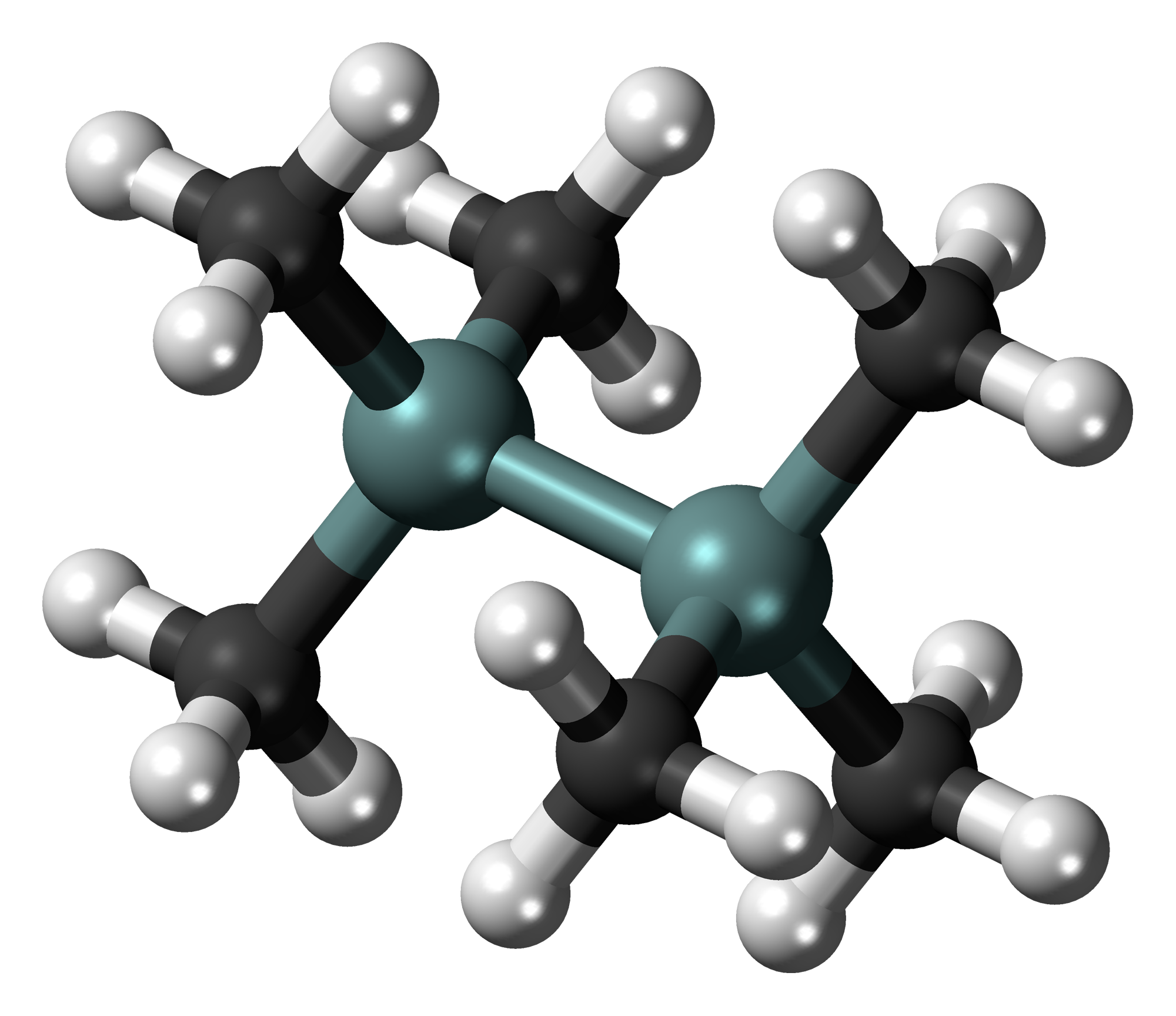

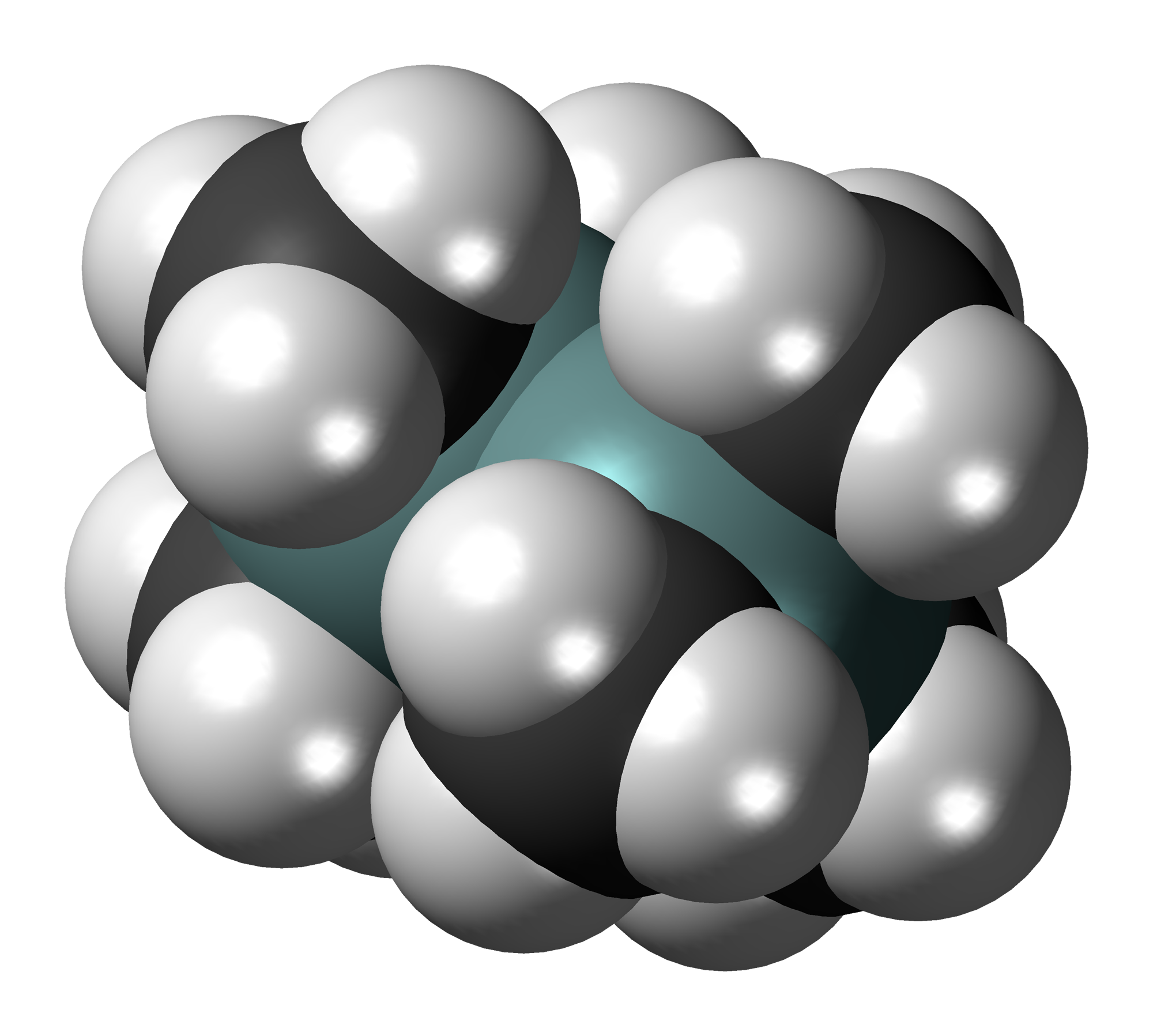

Names
- Preferred IUPAC name Hexamethyldisilane

Identifiers
CAS Number	1450-14-2
3D model (JSmol)	Interactive image
Beilstein Reference	1633463
ChemSpider	66675
ECHA InfoCard	100.014.465
EC Number	215-911-0
PubChem CID	74057
RTECS number	JM9170000
UNII	A7HH2E9DUB
UN number	1993
CompTox Dashboard (EPA)	DTXSID2061698
- InChI: InChI=1S/C6H18Si2/c1-7(2,3)8(4,5)6/h1-6H3 Key: NEXSMEBSBIABKL-UHFFFAOYSA-N
- SMILES: C[Si](C)(C)[Si](C)(C)C

Properties
Chemical formula	Si_{2}C_{6}H_{18}
Molar mass	146.39 g mol^{−1}
Appearance	Colourless liquid
Density	0.715 g/cm^{3}
Melting point	14 °C; 57 °F; 287 K
Boiling point	113 °C; 235 °F; 386 K
Refractive index (n_{D})	1.422

Thermochemistry
Std molar entropy (S^{⦵}_{298})	255.89 J K^{−1} mol^{−1} (at 22.52 °C)

Hazards
- GHS labelling
Pictograms	(GHS02: Flammable) (GHS07: Exclamation mark) (GHS08: Health hazard)
Signal word	Danger
Hazard statements	H225, H319, H334, H335
Precautionary statements	P210, P261, P305+P351+P338, P342+P311
Flash point	11 °C (52 °F; 284 K)

Related compounds
Related alkylsilanes	Tetramethylsilane Triethylsilane
- Except where otherwise noted, data are given for materials in their standard state (at 25 °C [77 °F], 100 kPa). verify (what is ?) Infobox references

Hexamethyldisilane (TMS_{2}) is the organosilicon compound with the formula Si_{2}(CH_{3})_{6}, abbreviated Si_{2}Me_{6}. It is a colourless liquid, soluble in organic solvents.

== Synthesis and reactions ==
Hexamethyldisilane can be produced by Wurtz-like coupling of trimethylsilyl chloride in the presence of a reducing agent such as potassium graphite:

2 Me_{3}SiCl + 2 K → Me_{3}Si−SiMe_{3} + 2 KCl

With an excess of the reductant, the alkali metal silyl derivative is produced:

Me_{3}Si−SiMe_{3} + 2 K → 2 Me_{3}SiK

The Si-Si bond in hexamethyldisilane is cleaved by strong nucleophiles and electrophiles. Alkyl lithium compounds react as follows:

Si_{2}Me_{6} + RLi → RSiMe_{3} + LiSiMe_{3}

Iodine gives trimethylsilyl iodide.

Me_{3}Si−SiMe_{3} + I_{2} → 2 SiMe_{3}I
