= Hydrocarboxyl =

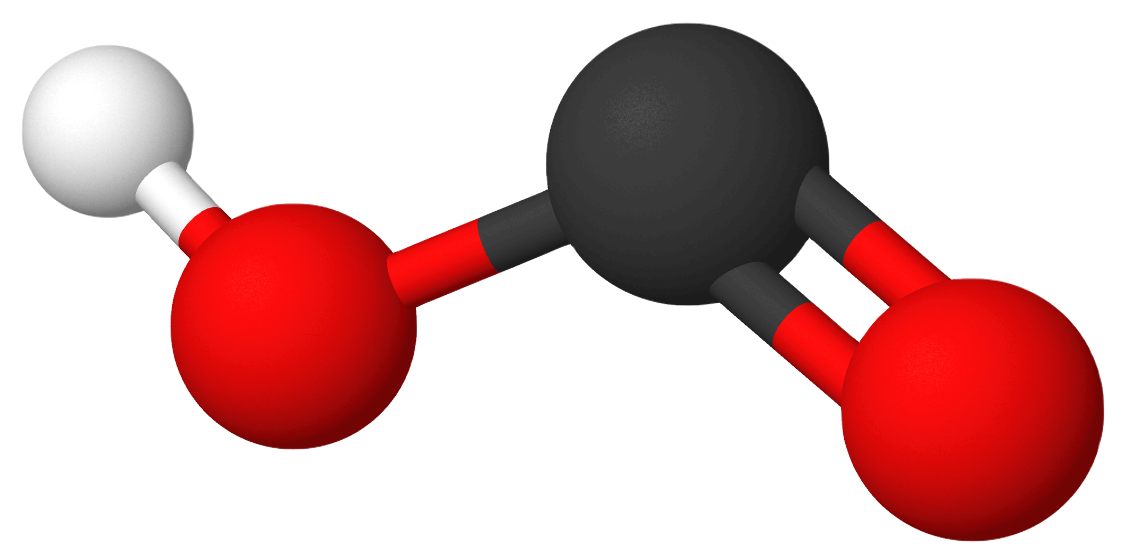

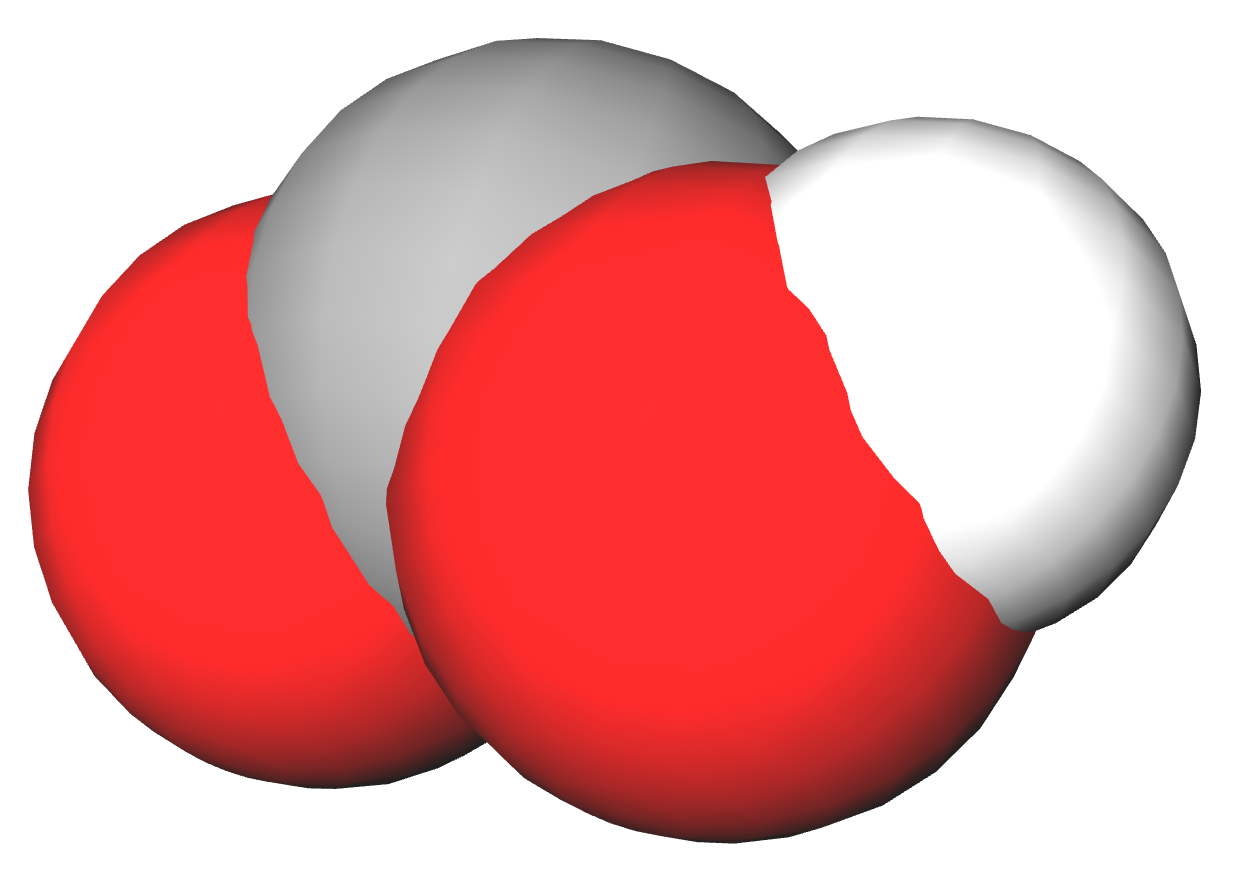

Names
- Other names hydroxycarbonyl;hydroxidooxidocarbon(.);formyloxidanyl

Identifiers
CAS Number	2564-86-5
3D model (JSmol)	Interactive image
Beilstein Reference	1901013
ChEBI	CHEBI:29326
ChemSpider	4574108
PubChem CID	137640
CompTox Dashboard (EPA)	DTXSID30180329
- InChI: : InChI=1S/CHO2/c2-1-3/h(H,2,3) Key: ORTFAQDWJHRMNX-UHFFFAOYSA-N
- SMILES: O=[C]O

Properties
Chemical formula	HOC^{*}O
Molar mass	45.0174 g/mol
- Except where otherwise noted, data are given for materials in their standard state (at 25 °C [77 °F], 100 kPa). Infobox references

The hydrocarboxyl radical, HOCO, is an unstable molecular radical important in combustion. It is formed by the reaction of the hydroxyl radical with carbon monoxide. Hydrocarboxyl then breaks up to form carbon dioxide and atomic hydrogen. Much of the carbon dioxide on Earth and Mars has been produced via the hydrocarboxyl radical. HOCO formed from OH and CO initially is in an excited state. It can transfer energy to other molecules such as N_{2} or other carbon monoxide molecules.

The production of this radical during combustion was originally predicted by Ian W. M. Smith and Reinhard Zellner in 1973. The HOCO radical was detected in its deuterated form DOCO by Bryce J. Bjork, Thinh Q. Bui, and Jun Ye in 2016.
