= Gasoline gallon equivalent =

Amount of an alternative fuel with equal energy content

Gasoline gallon equivalent (GGE) or gasoline-equivalent gallon (GEG) is the amount of an alternative fuel it takes to equal the energy content of one liquid gallon of gasoline. GGE allows consumers to compare the energy content of competing fuels against a commonly known fuel, namely gasoline.

It is difficult to compare the cost of gasoline with other fuels if they are sold in different units and physical forms. GGE attempts to solve this. One GGE of CNG and one GGE of electricity have exactly the same energy content as one gallon of gasoline. In this way, GGE provides a direct comparison of gasoline with alternative fuels, including those sold as a gas (natural gas, propane, hydrogen) and as metered electricity.

== Definition ==
In 1994, the US National Institute of Standards and Technology (NIST) defined "gasoline gallon equivalent (GGE) [as] 5.660 pounds of natural gas." Compressed natural gas (CNG), for example, is a gas rather than a liquid. It can be measured by its volume in standard cubic feet (ft^{3}) at atmospheric conditions, by its weight in pounds (lb), or by its energy content in joules (J), British thermal units (BTU), or kilowatt-hours (kW·h). CNG sold at filling stations in the US is priced in dollars per GGE.

Using GGE as a measure to compare the stored energy of various fuels for use in an internal combustion engine is only one input for consumers, who typically are interested in the annual cost of driving a vehicle, which requires considering the amount of useful work that can be extracted from a given fuel. This is measured by the car's overall efficiency. In the context of GGE, a real world measure of overall efficiency is the fuel economy or fuel consumption advertised by motor vehicle manufacturers.

=== Efficiency and consumption ===
To start, only a fraction of the stored energy of a given fuel (measured in BTU or kW-hr) can be converted to useful work by the vehicle's engine. The measure of this is engine efficiency, often called thermal efficiency in the case of internal combustion engines. A diesel cycle engine can be as much as 40% to 50% efficient at converting fuel into work, where a typical automotive gasoline engine's efficiency is about 25% to 30%.

In general, an engine is designed to run on a single fuel source and substituting one fuel for another may affect the thermal efficiency. Each fuel–engine combination requires adjusting the mix of air and fuel. This can be a manual adjustment using tools and test instruments or done automatically in computer-controlled fuel injected and multi-fuel vehicles. Forced induction for an internal combustion engine using supercharger or turbocharger may also affect the optimum fuel–air mix and thermal efficiency.

The overall efficiency of converting a unit of fuel to useful work (rotation of the driving wheels) includes consideration of thermal efficiency along with dynamic losses that are inherent and specific to the design of a given vehicle. Thermal efficiency is affected by both friction and heat losses; for internal combustion engines, some of the stored energy is lost as heat through the exhaust or cooling system. In addition, friction inside the engine happens along the cylinder walls, crankshaft rod bearings and main bearings, camshaft bearings, drive chains or gears, plus other miscellaneous and minor bearing surfaces. Other dynamic losses can be caused by friction outside the motor/engine, including loads from the generator / alternator, power steering pump, A/C compressor, transmission, transfer case (if four-wheel-drive), differential(s) and universal joints, plus rolling resistance of the pneumatic tires. The vehicle's external styling affects its aerodynamic drag, which is another dynamic loss that must be considered for overall efficiency.

In battery or electric vehicles, calculating the vehicle's overall efficiency of useful work begins with the charge–discharge rate of the battery pack, generally 80% to 90%. Next is the conversion of stored energy to distance traveled under power. Generally speaking, an electrical motor is far more efficient than an internal combustion engine at converting the stored potential energy into useful work; in an electric vehicle, traction motor efficiency can approach 90%, as there is minimal waste heat coming off the motor parts, and zero heat cast off by the coolant radiator and out of the exhaust. An electric motor typically has internal friction only at the main axle bearings. Additional losses will affect the overall efficiency, similar to a conventional internal combustion car, including rolling resistance, aerodynamic drag, accessory power, climate control, and drivetrain losses. See table below translating retail electricity costs for a GGE in BTU.

Overall efficiency is measured and reported, typically by government testing, through operating the vehicle in a standardized driving cycle designed to replicate typical use, while providing a consistent basis for comparison between vehicles. Cars sold in the United States are advertised by their measured overall efficiency (fuel economy) in miles per gallon (mpg). The MPG of a given vehicle starts with the thermal efficiency of the fuel and engine, less all of the above elements of friction. The fuel consumption is an equivalent measure for cars sold outside the United States, typically measured in litres per 100 km traveled; in general, the fuel consumption and miles per gallon would be reciprocals with appropriate conversion factors, but because different countries use different driving cycles to measure fuel consumption, fuel economy and fuel consumption are not always directly comparable.

=== Miles per gallon of gasoline equivalent (MPGe) ===
The MPGe metric was introduced in November 2010 by EPA in the Monroney label of the Nissan Leaf electric car and the Chevrolet Volt plug-in hybrid. The ratings are based on EPA's formula, in which 33.7 kilowatt hours of electricity is equivalent to one gallon of gasoline (giving a heating value of 115,010 BTU/US gal), and the energy consumption of each vehicle during EPA's five standard drive cycle tests simulating varying driving conditions. All new cars and light-duty trucks sold in the U.S. are required to have this label showing the EPA's estimate of fuel economy of the vehicle.

== Gasoline gallon equivalent tables ==
GGE calculated for gasoline in US gallons at 114,000 British thermal units per US gallon (7,594 kcal/L)
Fuel: liquid, US gallons	GGE	GGE %	BTU/gal	kWh/gal	HP-hr/gal	kcal/litre
Gasoline (base)	1.0000	100.00%	114,000	33.41	44.80	7,594.1
Gasoline (conventional, summer)	0.9956	100.44%	114,500	33.56	45.00	7,627.4
Gasoline (conventional, winter)	1.0133	98.68%	112,500	32.97	44.21	7,494.2
Gasoline (reformulated gasoline, E10 - ethanol)	1.0193	98.1%	111,836	32.78	43.95	7,449.9
Gasoline (reformulated gasoline, ETBE)	1.0196	98.08%	111,811	32.77	43.94	7,448.3
Gasoline (reformulated gasoline, MTBE)	1.0202	98.02%	111,745	32.75	43.92	7,443.9
Gasoline (10% MTBE)	1.0179	98.25%	112,000	32.82	44.02	7,460.9
Diesel #2	0.8803	113.6%	129,500	37.95	50.90	8,626.6
Biodiesel (B100)	0.9536	104.87%	119,550	35.04	46.98	7,963.8
Biodiesel (B20)	0.8959	111.62%	127,250	37.29	50.01	8,476.7
Liquid natural gas (LNG)	1.52	65.79%	75,000	21.98	29.48	4,996.1
Liquefied petroleum gas (propane / autogas) (LPG)	1.2459	80.26%	91,500	26.82	35.96	6,095.3
Methanol fuel (M100)	2.007	49.82%	56,800	16.65	22.32	3,783.7
Ethanol fuel (E100)	1.498	66.75%	76,100	22.30	29.91	5,069.4
Ethanol (E85)	1.3936	71.75%	81,800	23.97	32.15	5,449.1
Jet fuel (naphtha)	0.9604	104.12%	118,700	34.79	46.65	7,907.2
Jet fuel (kerosene)	0.8899	112.37%	128,100	37.54	50.35	8,533.4

GGE calculated on non-liquid fuels
Fuel: non-liquid	Gasoline gallon equivalent	Unit	Stored energy density
Gasoline (base)	1.0000	gallons (US)	114,000 BTU (33.41 kWh)/gal_{US}
Compressed natural gas (CNG) at standard conditions	123.57 ft^{3} (3.499 m^{3})	pound	20,160 BTU (5.91 kWh)/lb
Compressed natural gas (CNG) at 2,400 psi (17 MPa)	0.77 ft^{3} (0.022 m^{3})	pound	20,160 BTU (5.91 kWh)/lb
Hydrogen at atmospheric conditions, 101.325 kPa (14.6959 psi)	357.37 ft^{3} (10.120 m^{3})	ft^{3}	319 BTU (0.09 kWh)/ft^{3}
Hydrogen by weight	1 kg (2.205 lb)	kg	119.9 MJ (113,600 BTU; 33.3 kWh)/kg
Electricity	33.40 kilowatt-hours	kWh	3,413 BTU (1.00 kWh)

Electricity costs for 1 GGE
1 GGE = 33.40 kWh
For local rate per kWh	$/gallon equivalent
$0.03	$1.000
$0.04	$1.333
$0.05	$1.667
$0.06	$2.000
$0.07	$2.338
$0.08	$2.670
$0.09	$3.006
$0.10	$3.340
$0.11	$3.674
$0.12	$4.000
$0.13	$4.342
$0.14	$4.670
$0.15	$5.010
$0.16	$5.344
$0.17	$5.678
$0.18	$6.012
$0.19	$6.346
$0.20	$6.680
$0.25	$8.350
$0.27	$9.018
$0.28	$9.352
$0.29	$9.686
$0.30	$10.020

Rates per kWh for residential electricity in the USA range from $0.0728 (Idaho) to $0.166 (Alaska), $0.22 (San Diego Tier 1, while Tier 2 is $.40) and $0.2783 (Hawaii).

== Specific fuels ==
=== Compressed natural gas ===
One GGE of natural gas is 126.67 cubic feet (3.587 m^{3}) at standard conditions. This volume of natural gas has the same energy content as one US gallon of gasoline (based on lower heating values: 900 BTU/ft^{3} (9.3 kWh/m^{3}) of natural gas and 114,000 BTU/US gal (8.8 kWh/L) for gasoline).

One GGE of CNG pressurized at 2,400 psi (17 MPa) is 0.77 cubic feet (22 litres; 5.8 US gallons). This volume of CNG at 2,400 psi has the same energy content as one US gallon of gasoline (based on lower heating values: 148,144 BTU/ft^{3} (1,533.25 kWh/m^{3}) of CNG and 114,000 BTU/US gal (8.8 kWh/L) of gasoline. Using Boyle's law, the equivalent GGE at 3,600 psi (25 MPa) is 0.51 cubic feet (14 litres; 3.8 US gallons).

The National Conference of Weights & Measurements (NCWM) has developed a standard unit of measurement for compressed natural gas, defined in the NIST Handbook 44 Appendix D as follows: "1 Gasoline [US] gallon equivalent (GGE) means 2.567 kg (5.660 lb) of natural gas."

When consumers refuel their CNG vehicles in the US, the CNG is usually measured and sold in GGE units. This is fairly helpful as a comparison to gallons of gasoline.

=== Ethanol and blended fuels (E85) ===
1.5 US gallons (5.7 litres) of ethanol has the same energy content as 1.0 US gal (3.8 L) of gasoline.

The energy content of ethanol is 76,100 BTU/US gal (5.89 kilowatt-hours per litre), compared to 114,100 BTU/US gal (8.83 kWh/L) for gasoline. (see chart above)

A flex-fuel vehicle will experience about 76% of the fuel mileage MPG when using E85 (85% ethanol) products as compared to 100% gasoline. Simple calculations of the BTU values of the ethanol and the gasoline indicate the reduced heat values available to the internal combustion engine. Pure ethanol provides 2/3 of the heat value available in pure gasoline.

In the most common calculation, that is, the BTU value of pure gasoline vs gasoline with 10% ethanol, the latter has just over 96% BTU value of pure gasoline. Gasoline BTU varies relating to the Reid vapor pressure (causing easier vaporization in winter blends containing ethanol (ethanol is difficult to start a vehicle on when it is cold out) and anti-knock additives. Such additives offer a reduction in BTU value.

== See also ==
- Engine efficiency
- Thermal efficiency
- Potential energy
- Work (thermodynamics)
- Work (physics)
- Diesel cycle engines
- Efficiency
- Friction
- Kilowatt hour
