= Gasoline =

Liquid fuel derived from petroleum

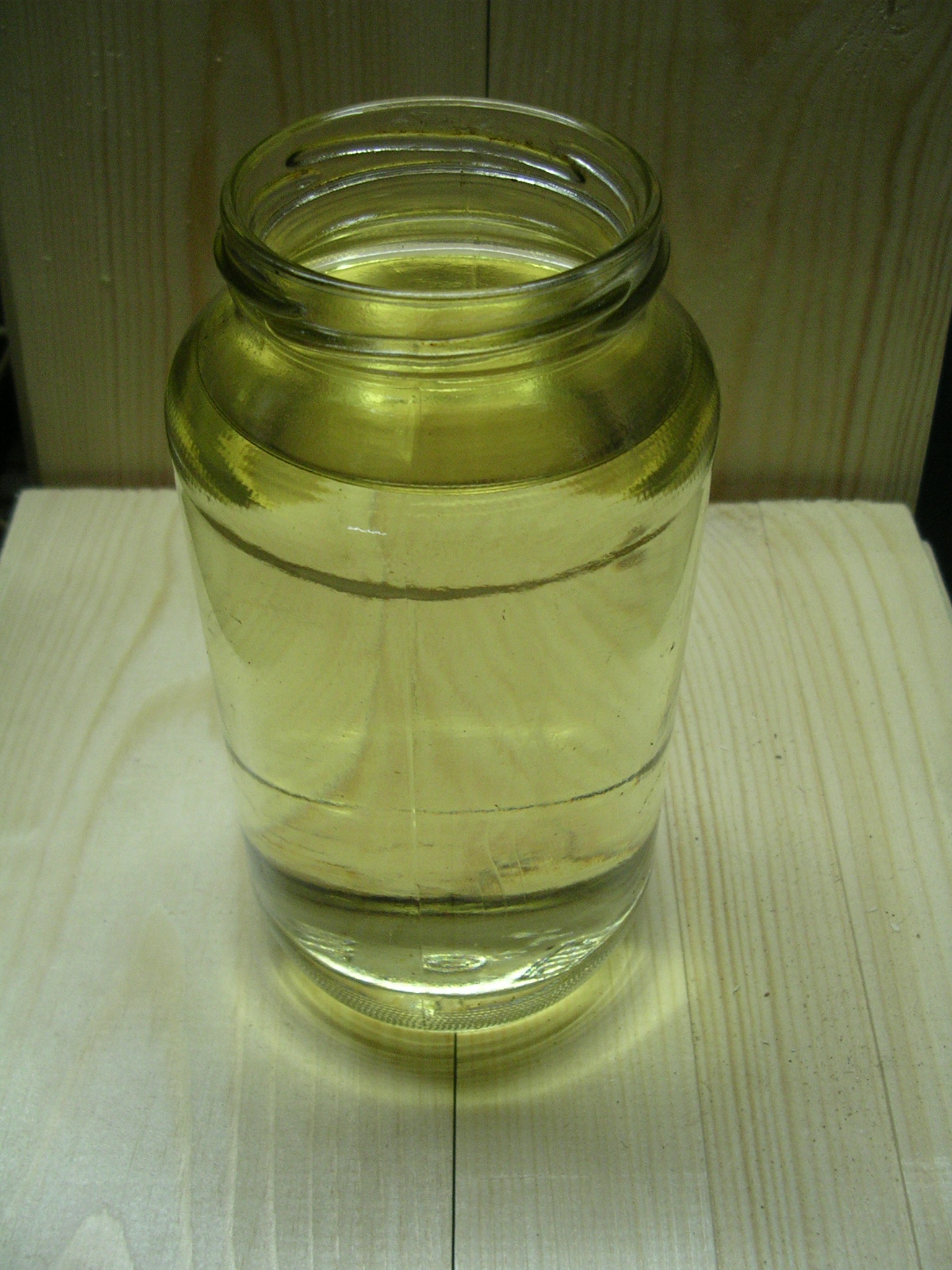
Gasoline in a glass jar

Gasoline (North American English) or petrol (in other English-speaking countries) is a petrochemical product, a transparent, yellowish and flammable liquid normally used as a fuel for spark-ignited internal combustion engines (ICEs). It is chemically composed of organic compounds derived from the fractional distillation of petroleum and later chemically enhanced with gasoline additives. It is a high-volume profitable product produced in crude oil refineries.

The ability of a particular gasoline blend to resist premature ignition (which causes knocking and reduces efficiency in reciprocating engines) is measured by its octane rating or performance number. Tetraethyl lead was once widely used to increase the octane rating but is not used in modern automotive gasoline due to the health hazard. Aviation, off-road motor vehicles, and some racing car engines still use leaded gasolines. Other substances are frequently added to gasoline to improve chemical stability and performance characteristics, control corrosion, and provide fuel system cleaning. Gasoline may contain oxygen-containing chemicals such as ethanol, MTBE, or ETBE to improve combustion.

== History and etymology ==
English dictionaries show that the term gasoline originates from gas plus the chemical suffixes -ole and -ine. Petrol derives from the Medieval Latin word petroleum (L. petra, rock + oleum, oil).

Interest in gasoline-like fuels started with the invention of internal combustion engines (ICEs) suitable for use in transportation applications. The so-called Otto engines were developed in Germany during the last quarter of the 19th century. The fuel for these early engines was a relatively volatile hydrocarbon obtained initially from coal gas. With a boiling point near 85 °C (185 °F) (n-octane boils at 125.62 °C (258.12 °F)), it was well suited for early carburettors (evaporators). By 1900, fuel in the UK had been standardised as being distilled from petroleum and having specific gravity 0.680; it would have been a mixture mainly of C4–C8 alkanes and cycloalkanes with an octane far below those of modern fuels. (Note: The low octane of early fuels led to the search for a cheap additive which would improve it. Tetraethyl lead was found in the 1920s to do this and was used until phased out from the 1970s.)

The development of the "spray nozzle" carburettor by Wilhelm Maybach from 1892 enabled the use of less volatile, richer fuels. Further improvements in engine efficiency were attempted at higher compression ratios, but early attempts were blocked by the premature explosion of fuel, known as knocking. In 1891, the Shukhov cracking process became the world's first commercial method to break down heavier hydrocarbons in crude oil to increase the percentage of lighter products compared to simple distillation.

== Chemical analysis and production ==
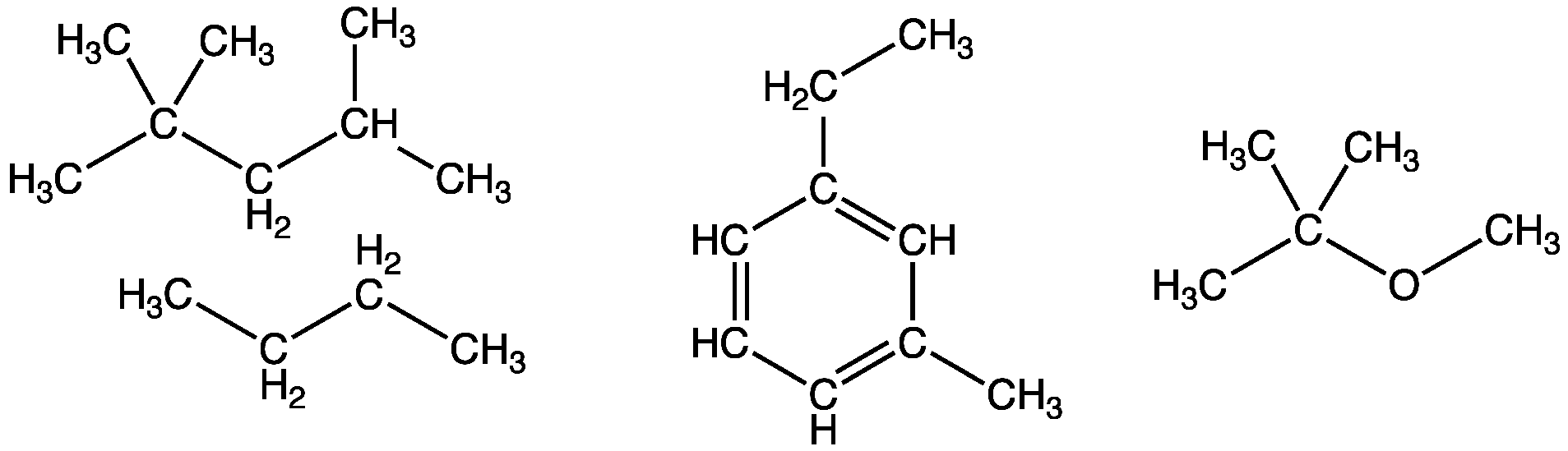
Some of the components of gasoline: isooctane, butane, 3-ethyltoluene, and the octane enhancer MTBE

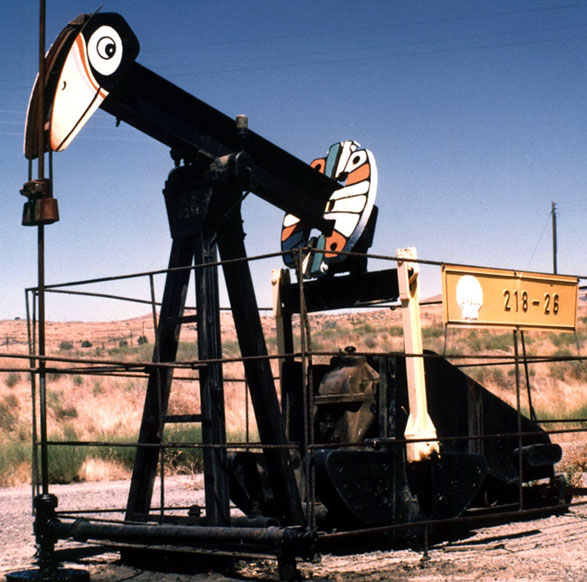
A pumpjack in the United States

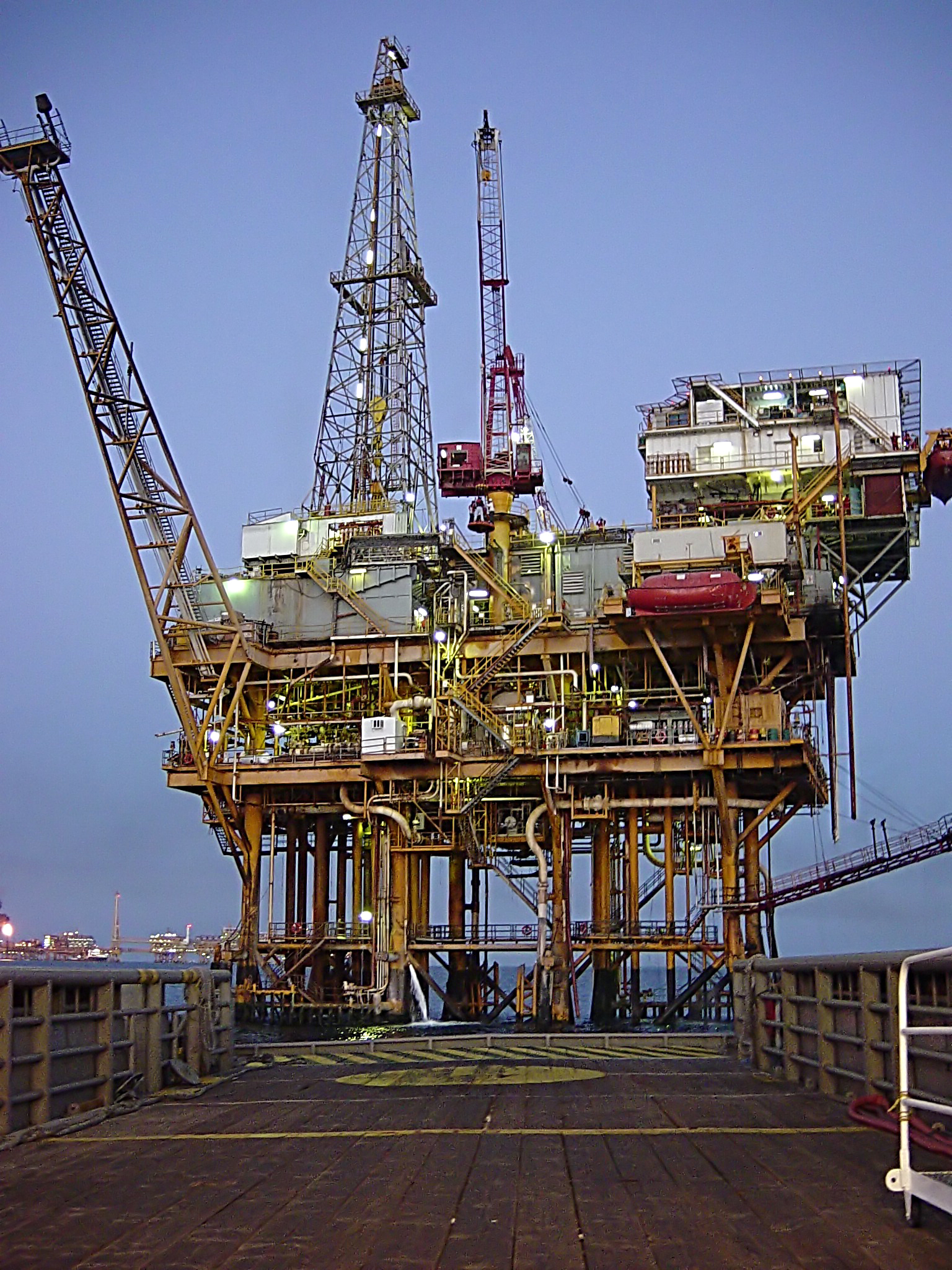
An oil platform in the Gulf of Mexico

Commercial gasoline, as well as other liquid transportation fuels, are complex mixtures of hydrocarbons. The performance specification also varies with season, requiring less volatile blends during summer, in order to minimize evaporative losses.

Gasoline is produced in oil refineries. Roughly 72 liters (19 U.S. gal) of gasoline is derived from a 160-liter (42 U.S. gal) barrel of crude oil. Material separated from crude oil via distillation, called virgin or straight-run gasoline, does not meet specifications for modern engines, particularly the octane rating; see below, but can be pooled to the gasoline blend.

The bulk of a typical gasoline consists of a homogeneous mixture of hydrocarbons with between four and twelve carbon atoms per molecule, commonly referred to as C4–C12. It is a mixture of paraffins (alkanes), olefins (alkenes), naphthenes (cycloalkanes), and aromatics. The use of the term paraffin in place of the standard chemical nomenclature alkane is particular to the oil industry, which relies extensively on jargon. The composition of a gasoline depends upon:

- the oil refinery that makes the gasoline, as not all refineries have the same set of processing units;
- the crude oil feed used by the refinery;
- the grade of gasoline sought, in particular, the octane rating.

The various refinery streams blended to make gasoline have different characteristics. Some important streams include the following:

- Straight-run gasoline, sometimes referred to as naphtha (and also light straight run naphtha "LSR" and light virgin naphtha "LVN"), is distilled directly from crude oil. Once the leading source of fuel, naphtha's low octane rating required organometallic fuel additives (primarily tetraethyllead) prior to their phaseout from the gasoline pool which started in 1975 in the United States. Straight run naphtha is typically low in aromatics (depending on the grade of the crude oil stream) and contains some cycloalkanes (naphthenes) and no olefins (alkenes). Between 0 and 20 percent of this stream is pooled into the finished gasoline because the quantity of this fraction in the crude is less than fuel demand and the fraction's Research Octane Number (RON) is too low. The chemical properties (namely RON and Reid vapor pressure (RVP)) of the straight-run gasoline can be improved through reforming and isomerization. However, before feeding those units, the naphtha needs to be split into light and heavy naphtha. Straight-run gasoline can also be used as a feedstock for steam crackers to produce olefins.
- Reformate, produced from straight run gasoline in a catalytic reformer, has a high octane rating with high aromatic content and relatively low olefin content. Most of the benzene, toluene, and xylene (the so-called BTX hydrocarbons) are more valuable as chemical feedstocks and are thus removed to some extent. Also the BTX content is regulated.
- Catalytic cracked gasoline, or catalytic cracked naphtha, produced with a catalytic cracker, has a moderate octane rating, high olefin content, and moderate aromatic content.
- Hydrocrackate (heavy, mid, and light), produced with a hydrocracker, has a medium to low octane rating and moderate aromatic levels.
- Alkylate is produced in an alkylation unit, using isobutane and C3-/C4-olefins as feedstocks. Finished alkylate contains no aromatics or olefins and has a high MON (Motor Octane Number). Alkylate was used during World War II in aviation fuel. Since the late 1980s, it is sold as a specialty fuel for (handheld) gardening and forestry tools with a combustion engine.
- Isomerate is obtained by isomerizing low-octane straight-run gasoline into iso-paraffins (non-chain alkanes, such as isooctane). Isomerate has a medium RON and MON, but no aromatics or olefins.
- Butane is usually blended in the gasoline pool, although the quantity of this stream is limited by the RVP specification.
- Oxygenates (more specifically alcohols and esters) are mostly blended into the pool in the US as ethanol. In Europe and other countries, the blends can contain ethanol in addition to Methyl tertiary-butyl ether (MTBE) and Ethyl tert-butyl ether (ETBE). MTBE in the United States was banned by most states in the early-to-mid-2000s. A few countries still allow methanol as well to be blended directly into gasoline, especially in China. More about oxygenates and blending is covered further in this article.

Many countries set limits on gasoline aromatics in general, benzene in particular, and olefin (alkene) content. Such regulations have led to an increasing preference for alkane isomers, such as isomerate or alkylate, as their octane rating is higher than n-alkanes. In the European Union, the benzene limit is set at one percent by volume for all grades of automotive gasoline. This is usually achieved by avoiding feeding C6, in particular cyclohexane, to the reformer unit, where it would be converted to benzene. Therefore, only (desulfurized) heavy virgin naphtha (HVN) is fed to the reformer unit.

Gasoline can also contain other organic compounds, such as organic ethers, deliberately added, plus small levels of contaminants, in particular organosulfur compounds, which are usually removed at the refinery.

On average, U.S. petroleum refineries produce about 19 to 20 gallons of gasoline, 11 to 13 gallons of distillate fuel diesel fuel and 3 to 4 gallons of jet fuel from each 42 U.S. gallons (160 liters) barrel of crude oil. The product ratio depends upon the processing in an oil refinery and the crude oil assay.

== Physical properties ==
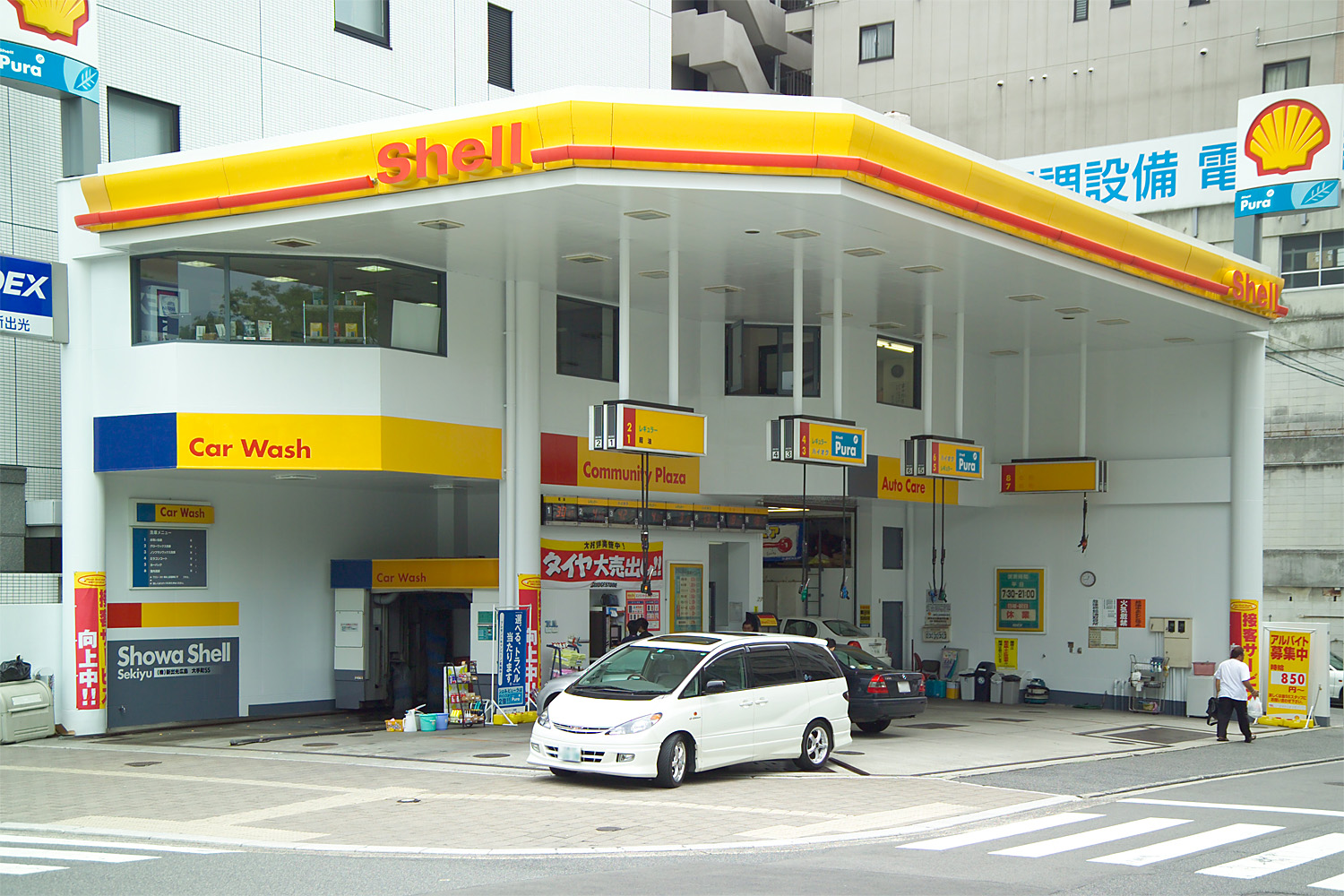
A Shell filling station in Hiroshima, Japan

=== Density ===
The specific gravity of modern gasoline ranges from 0.71 to 0.77, with higher densities having a greater volume fraction of aromatics. Finished marketable gasoline is traded (in Europe) with a standard reference of 0.755 kilograms per liter (6.30 lb/U.S. gal), (7,5668 lb/ imp gal). Its price is escalated or de-escalated according to its actual density. Because of its low density, gasoline floats on water, and therefore water cannot generally be used to extinguish a gasoline fire unless applied in a fine mist.

=== Stability ===
Quality gasoline should be stable for six months if stored properly, but can degrade over time. Gasoline stored for a year will most likely be able to be burned in an internal combustion engine (ICE) without too much trouble. Gasoline should ideally be stored in an airtight container (to prevent oxidation or water vapor mixing in with the gas) that can withstand the vapor pressure of the gasoline without venting (to prevent the loss of the more volatile fractions) at a stable cool temperature, to reduce the excess pressure from liquid expansion and to reduce the rate of any decomposition reactions.

When gasoline is not stored correctly, gums and solids may result, which can corrode system components and accumulate on wet surfaces, resulting in a condition called "stale fuel". Gasoline containing ethanol is especially subject to absorbing atmospheric moisture, then forming gums, solids, or two phases (a hydrocarbon phase floating on top of a water-alcohol phase).

The presence of these degradation products in the fuel tank or fuel lines plus a carburettor or fuel injection components makes it harder to start the engine, or causes reduced engine performance. On resumption of regular engine use, the buildup may or may not be eventually cleaned out by the flow of fresh gasoline. The addition of a fuel stabilizer to gasoline can extend the life of fuel that is not or cannot be stored properly. Removal of all fuel from a fuel system is the only real solution to the problem of long-term storage of an engine or a machine or vehicle.

Typical fuel stabilizers are proprietary mixtures containing mineral spirits, isopropyl alcohol, 1,2,4-trimethylbenzene or other additives. Fuel stabilizers are commonly used for small engines, such as lawnmower and tractor engines, especially when their use is sporadic or seasonal (little to no use for one or more seasons of the year). Users have been advised to keep gasoline containers more than half full and properly capped to reduce air exposure, to avoid storage at high temperatures, to run an engine for ten minutes to circulate the stabilizer through all components prior to storage, and to run the engine at intervals to purge stale fuel from the carburettor.

Gasoline stability requirements are set by the standard ASTM D4814. This standard describes the various characteristics and requirements of automotive fuels for use over a wide range of operating conditions in ground vehicles equipped with spark-ignition engines.

=== Combustion energy content ===
A gasoline-fueled ICE obtains energy from the combustion of gasoline's various hydrocarbons with oxygen from the ambient air, yielding carbon dioxide and water as exhaust. The combustion of octane, a representative species, performs the chemical reaction:

2 C_{8}H_{18} + 25 O_{2} → 16 CO_{2} + 18 H_{2}O

By weight, combustion of gasoline releases about 46.7 megajoules per kilogram (13.0 kWh/kg; 21.2 MJ/lb) or by volume 33.6 megajoules per liter (9.3 kWh/L; 127 MJ/U.S. gal; 121,000 BTU/U.S. gal), quoting the lower heating value. Gasoline blends differ, and therefore actual energy content varies according to the season and producer by up to 1.75 percent more or less than the average. On average, about 74 liters (20 U.S. gal) of gasoline are available from a barrel of crude oil (about 46 percent by volume), varying with the quality of the crude and the grade of the gasoline. The remainder is products ranging from tar to naphtha.

A high-octane-rated fuel, such as liquefied petroleum gas (LPG), has an overall lower power output at the typical 10:1 compression ratio of an engine design optimized for gasoline fuel. An engine tuned for LPG fuel via higher compression ratios (typically 12:1) improves the power output. This is because higher-octane fuels allow for a higher compression ratio without knocking, resulting in a higher cylinder temperature, which improves efficiency.

Increased mechanical efficiency is created by a higher compression ratio through the concomitant higher expansion ratio on the power stroke, which is by far the greater effect. The higher expansion ratio extracts more work from the high-pressure gas created by the combustion process. An Atkinson cycle engine uses the timing of the valve events to produce the benefits of a high expansion ratio without the disadvantages, chiefly detonation, of a high compression ratio. A high expansion ratio is also one of the two key reasons for the efficiency of diesel engines, along with the elimination of pumping losses due to throttling of the intake airflow.

The lower energy content of LPG by liquid volume in comparison to gasoline is due mainly to its lower density. This lower density is a property of the lower molecular weight of propane (LPG's chief component) compared to gasoline's blend of various hydrocarbon compounds with heavier molecular weights than propane. Conversely, LPG's energy content by weight is higher than gasoline's due to a higher hydrogen-to-carbon ratio.

Molecular weights of the species in the representative octane combustion are 114, 32, 44, and 18 for C_{8}H_{18}, O_{2}, CO_{2}, and H_{2}O, respectively; therefore one kilogram (2.2 lb) of fuel reacts with 3.51 kilograms (7.7 lb) of oxygen to produce 3.09 kilograms (6.8 lb) of carbon dioxide and 1.42 kilograms (3.1 lb) of water.

== Octane rating ==
Octane rating is measured relative to a mixture of 2,2,4-trimethylpentane (an isomer of octane) and n-heptane. There are different conventions for expressing octane ratings, so the same physical fuel may have several different octane ratings based on the measure used. One of the best known is the research octane number (RON).

The octane rating of typical commercially available gasoline varies by country. In Finland, Sweden, and Norway, 95 RON is the standard for regular unleaded gasoline and 98 RON is also available as a more expensive option.

In the United Kingdom, over 95 percent of gasoline sold has 95 RON and is marketed as Unleaded or Premium Unleaded. Super Unleaded, with 97/98 RON and branded high-performance fuels (e.g., Shell V-Power, BP Ultimate) with 99 RON make up the balance. Gasoline with 102 RON may rarely be available for racing purposes.

In the U.S., octane ratings in unleaded fuels vary between 85 and 87 AKI (91–92 RON) for regular, 89–90 AKI (94–95 RON) for mid-grade (equivalent to European regular), up to 90–94 AKI (95–99 RON) for premium (European premium).

	91	92	93	94	95	96	97	98	99	100	101	102
Scandinavian					Regular			Premium				
UK					Regular		Premium		Super			High-performance
US	Regular			Mid-grade		Premium						

As South Africa's largest city, Johannesburg, is located on the Highveld at 1,753 meters (5,751 ft) above sea level, the Automobile Association of South Africa recommends 95-octane gasoline at low altitude and 93-octane for use in Johannesburg because "The higher the altitude the lower the air pressure, and the lower the need for a high octane fuel as there is no real performance gain".

Octane rating became important as the military sought higher output for aircraft engines in the late 1920s and the 1940s. A higher octane rating allows a higher compression ratio or supercharger boost, and thus higher temperatures and pressures, which translate to higher power output. Some scientists even predicted that a nation with a good supply of high-octane gasoline would have the advantage in air power. In 1943, the Rolls-Royce Merlin aero engine produced 980 kilowatts (1,320 hp) using 100 RON fuel from a modest 27 liters (1,600 cu in) displacement. By the time of Operation Overlord, both the RAF and USAAF were conducting some operations in Europe using 150 RON fuel (100/150 avgas), obtained by adding 2.5 percent aniline to 100-octane avgas. By this time, the Rolls-Royce Merlin 66 was developing 1,500 kilowatts (2,000 hp) using this fuel.

== Additives ==
=== Antiknock additives ===
==== Tetraethyl lead ====
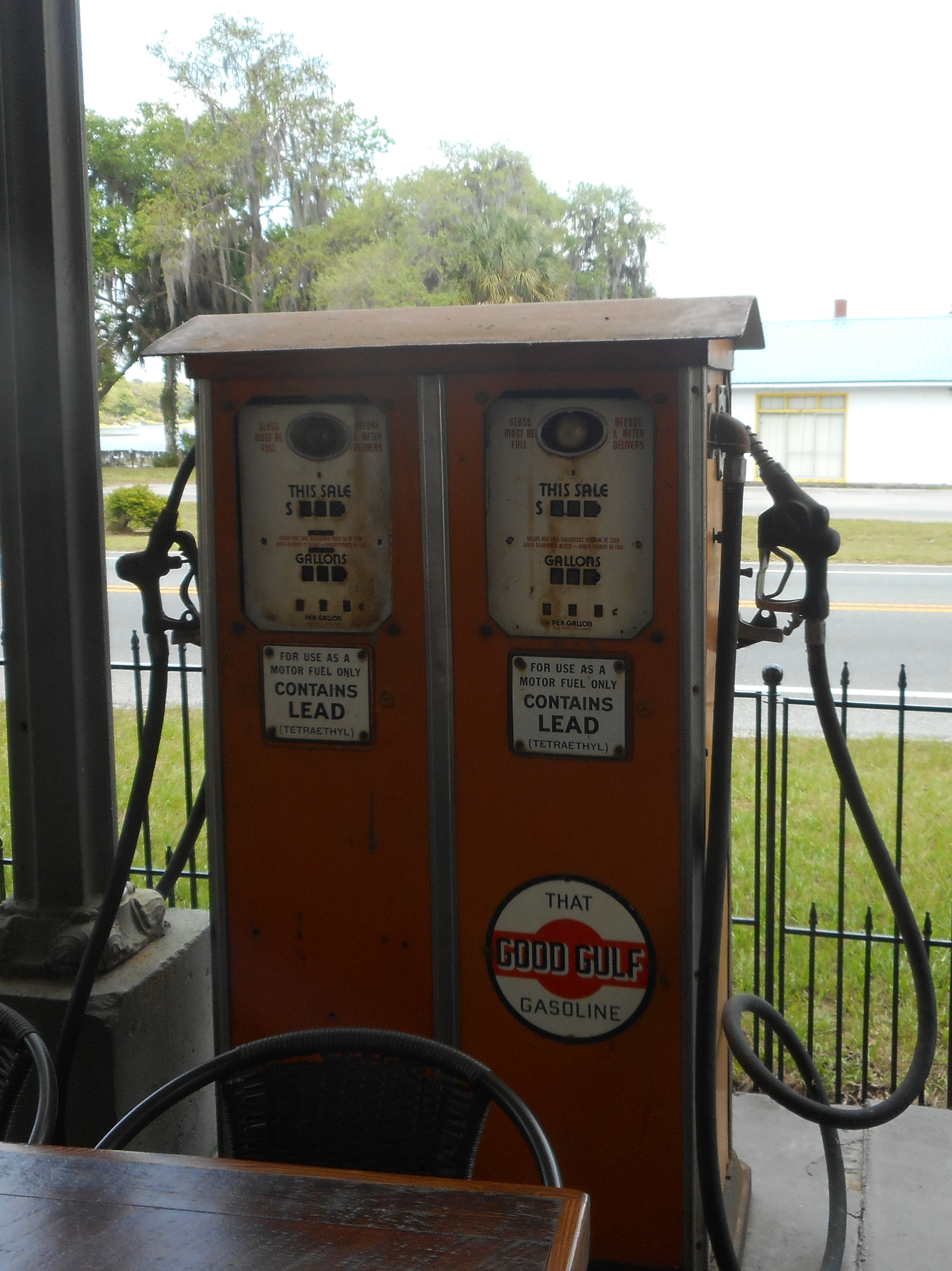
Leaded gasoline pump

Gasoline, when used in high-compression internal combustion engines (ICEs), tends to auto-ignite or "detonate" causing damaging engine knocking, also called "pinging" or "pinking". To address this problem, tetraethyl lead (TEL) was widely adopted as an additive for gasoline in the 1920s. With a growing awareness of the seriousness of the extent of environmental and health damage caused by lead compounds, and the incompatibility of lead with catalytic converters, governments began to mandate reductions in gasoline lead.

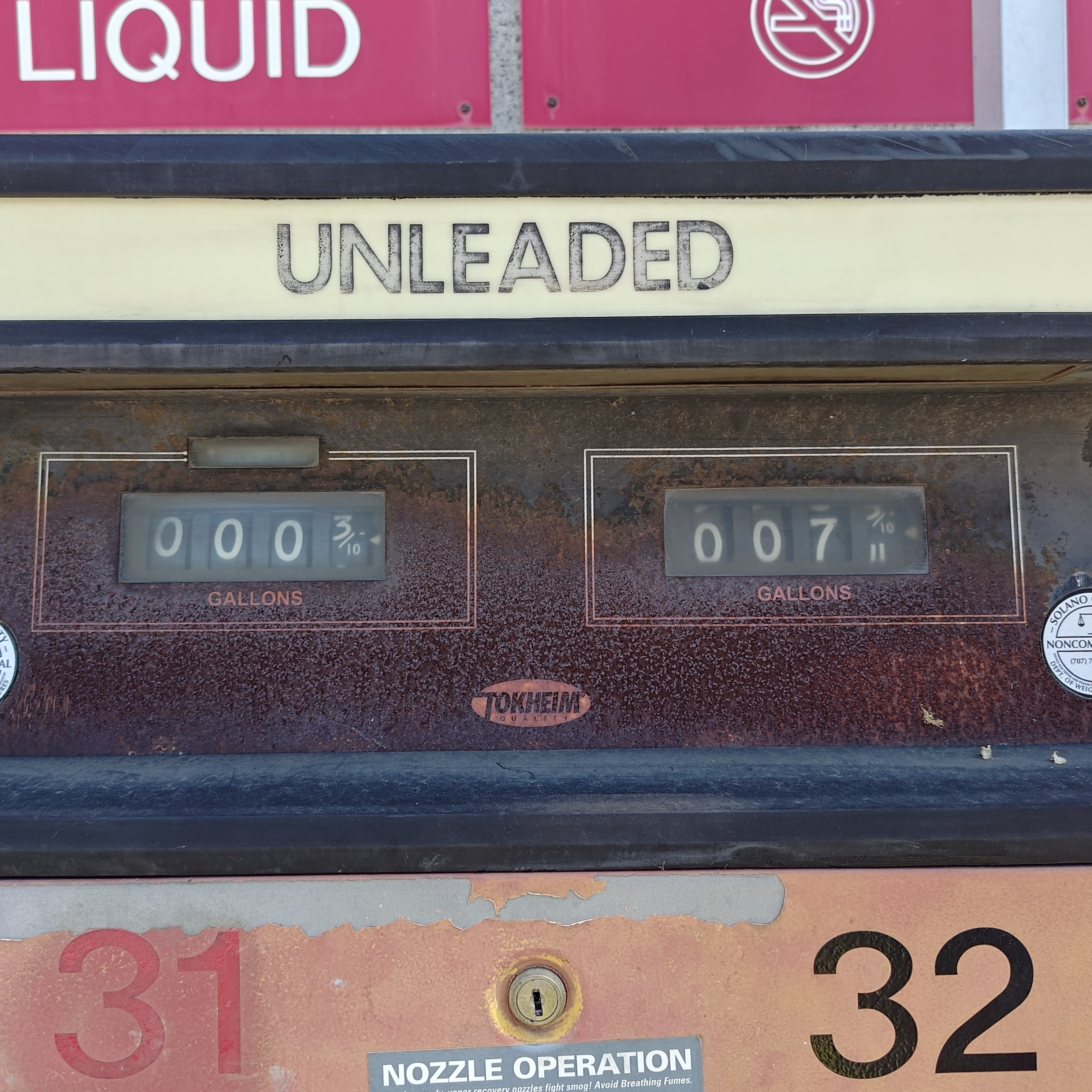
A gasoline pump with a large "unleaded" notice

In the U.S., the Environmental Protection Agency issued regulations to reduce the lead content of leaded gasoline over a series of annual phases, scheduled to begin in 1973 but delayed by court appeals until 1976. By 1995, leaded fuel accounted for only 0.6 percent of total gasoline sales and under 1,800 metric tons (2,000 short tons; 1,800 long tons) of lead per year. From January 1996, the U.S. Clean Air Act banned the sale of leaded fuel for use in on-road vehicles in the U.S. The use of TEL also necessitated other additives, such as dibromoethane.

European countries began replacing lead-containing additives at the end of the 1980s. By the end of the 1990s, leaded gasoline was banned within the entire European Union with an exception for Avgas 100LL for general aviation. The UAE started to switch to unleaded in the early 2000s.

Reduction in the average lead content of human blood may be a major cause for falling violent crime rates around the world including South Africa. A study found a correlation between leaded gasoline usage and violent crime (see Lead–crime hypothesis). Other studies found no correlation.

In August 2021, the UN Environment Programme announced that leaded gasoline had been eradicated worldwide, with Algeria being the last country to deplete its reserves. UN Secretary-General António Guterres called the eradication of leaded petrol an "international success story". He also added: "Ending the use of leaded petrol will prevent more than one million premature deaths each year from heart disease, strokes and cancer, and it will protect children whose IQs are damaged by exposure to lead". Greenpeace called the announcement "the end of one toxic era".

Leaded gasoline continues to be used in aeronautic, auto racing, and off-road applications. The use of leaded additives is still permitted worldwide for the formulation of some grades of aviation gasoline such as 100LL, because the required octane rating is difficult to reach without the use of leaded additives.

Different additives have replaced lead compounds. The most popular additives include aromatic hydrocarbons, ethers (MTBE and ETBE), and alcohols, most commonly ethanol.

==== Lead replacement petrol ====
Lead replacement petrol (LRP) was developed for vehicles designed to run on leaded fuels and incompatible with unleaded fuels. Rather than tetraethyllead, it contains other metals such as potassium compounds or methylcyclopentadienyl manganese tricarbonyl (MMT); these are purported to buffer soft exhaust valves and seats so that they do not suffer recession due to the use of unleaded fuel.

LRP was marketed during and after the phaseout of leaded motor fuels in the United Kingdom, Australia, South Africa, and some other countries. Consumer confusion led to a widespread mistaken preference for LRP rather than unleaded, and LRP was phased out 8 to 10 years after the introduction of unleaded.

Leaded gasoline was withdrawn from sale in Britain after 31 December 1999, seven years after EEC regulations signalled the end of production for cars using leaded gasoline in member states. At this stage, a large percentage of cars from the 1980s and early 1990s which ran on leaded gasoline were still in use, along with cars that could run on unleaded fuel. The declining number of such cars on British roads saw many filling stations withdrawing LRP from sale by 2003.

==== MMT ====
Methylcyclopentadienyl manganese tricarbonyl (MMT) is used in Canada and the U.S. to boost octane rating. Its use in the U.S. has been restricted by regulations, although it is currently allowed. Its use in the European Union is restricted by Article 8a of the Fuel Quality Directive following its testing under the Protocol for the evaluation of effects of metallic fuel-additives on the emissions performance of vehicles.

=== Fuel stabilizers (antioxidants and metal deactivators) ===
Substituted phenols and derivatives of phenylenediamine are common antioxidants used to inhibit gum formation in gasoline

Gummy, sticky resin deposits result from oxidative degradation of gasoline during long-term storage. These harmful deposits arise from the oxidation of alkenes and other minor components in gasoline (see drying oils). Improvements in refinery techniques have generally reduced the susceptibility of gasolines to these problems. Previously, catalytically or thermally cracked gasolines were most susceptible to oxidation. The formation of gums is accelerated by copper salts, which can be neutralized by additives called metal deactivators.

This degradation can be prevented through the addition of 5–100 ppm of antioxidants, such as phenylenediamines and other amines. Hydrocarbons with a bromine number of 10 or above can be protected with the combination of unhindered or partially hindered phenols and oil-soluble strong amine bases, such as hindered phenols. "Stale" gasoline can be detected by a colorimetric enzymatic test for organic peroxides produced by oxidation of the gasoline.

Gasolines are also treated with metal deactivators, which are compounds that sequester (deactivate) metal salts that otherwise accelerate the formation of gummy residues. The metal impurities might arise from the engine itself or as contaminants in the fuel.

=== Detergents ===
Gasoline, as delivered at the pump, also contains additives to reduce internal engine carbon buildup, improve combustion and allow easier starting in cold climates. High levels of detergent can be found in Top Tier Detergent Gasolines. The specification for Top Tier Detergent Gasolines was developed by four automakers: GM, Honda, Toyota, and BMW. According to the bulletin, the minimal U.S. EPA requirement is not sufficient to keep engines clean. Typical detergents include alkylamines and alkyl phosphates at a level of 50–100 ppm.

=== Ethanol ===
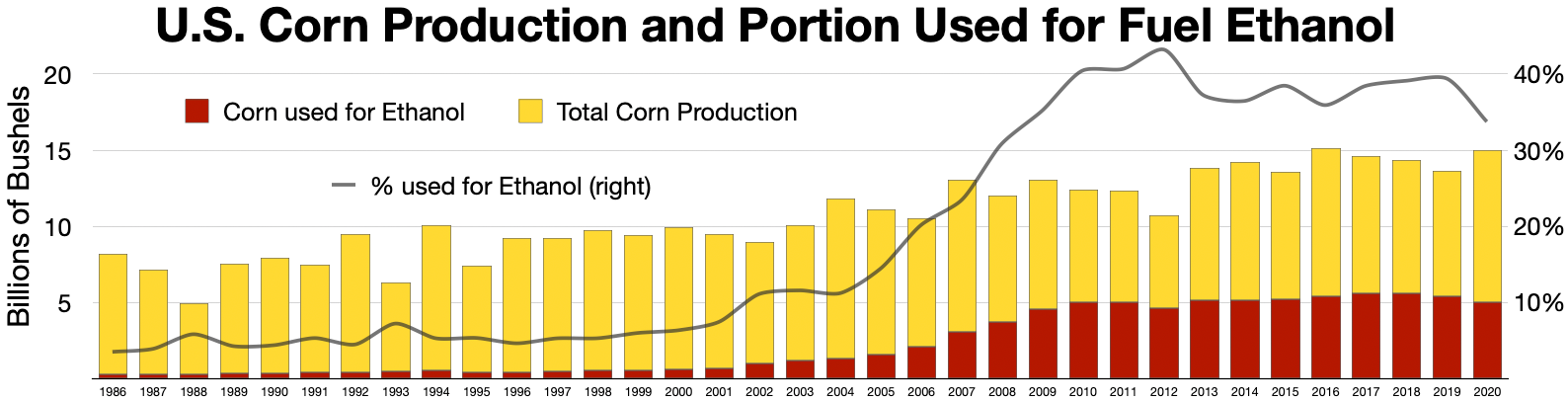
Corn vs ethanol production in the United States, 1986 to 2020 Total corn production (bushels) (left) Corn used for ethanol fuel (bushels) (left) Percent of corn used for ethanol (right)

==== European Union ====
In the EU, 5 percent ethanol can be added within the common gasoline spec (EN 228). Discussions are ongoing to allow 10 percent blending of ethanol, available in Finnish, French and German filling stations. In Finland, most stations sell 95E10, which is 10 percent ethanol, and 98E5, which is 5 percent ethanol. Most gasoline sold in Sweden has 5–15 percent ethanol added.

Three different ethanol blends are sold in the Netherlands—E5, E10 and hE15. The last of these differs from standard ethanol–gasoline blends in that it consists of 15 percent hydrous ethanol (i.e., the ethanol–water azeotrope) instead of the anhydrous ethanol traditionally used for blending with gasoline.

From 2009 to 2022, renewable percentage in gasoline slowly increased from 5% to 10%, even though EU-produced ethanol can achieve a climate-neutral production capability and most EU cars can use E10. E10 availability is low even in larger countries like Germany (26%) and France (58%). 8 countries in the EU have not adopted E10 as of 2024.

==== Brazil ====
The Brazilian National Agency of Petroleum, Natural Gas and Biofuels (ANP) requires gasoline for automobile use to have 27.5 percent of ethanol added to its composition. Pure hydrated ethanol is also available as a fuel.

==== Australia ====
Australia uses E10 (up to 10% ethanol) and E85 (up to 85% ethanol) in its gasoline. New South Wales mandated biofuel in its Biofuels Act 2007, and Queensland had a biofuel mandate since 2017. Fuel pumps must be clearly labelled with its ethanol/biodiesel content.

==== U.S. ====
The federal Renewable Fuel Standard (RFS) effectively requires refiners and blenders to blend renewable biofuels (mostly ethanol) with gasoline, sufficient to meet a growing annual target of total gallons blended. Although the mandate does not require a specific percentage of ethanol, annual increases in the target combined with declining gasoline consumption have caused the typical ethanol content in gasoline to approach 10 percent.

Most fuel pumps display a sticker that states that the fuel may contain up to 10 percent ethanol, an intentional disparity that reflects the varying actual percentage. In parts of the U.S., ethanol is sometimes added to gasoline without an indication that it is a component.

==== India ====
In October 2007, the Government of India decided to make five percent ethanol blending (with gasoline) mandatory. Currently, 10 percent ethanol blended product (E10) is being sold in parts of the country. Ethanol has been found in at least one study to damage catalytic converters. In July, 2025, India has mandated blending of E20 despite facing backlash.

=== Dyes ===
Though gasoline is a naturally colourless liquid, many gasolines are dyed in various colours to indicate their composition and acceptable uses. In Australia, the lowest grade of gasoline (RON 91) was dyed a light shade of red/orange, but is now the same colour as the medium grade (RON 95) and high octane (RON 98), which are dyed yellow.

In the U.S., aviation gasoline (avgas) is dyed to identify its octane rating and to distinguish it from kerosene-based jet fuel, which is left colourless. In Canada, the gasoline for marine and farm use is dyed red and is not subject to fuel excise tax in most provinces.

=== Oxygenate blending ===
Oxygenate blending adds oxygen-bearing compounds such as methanol, MTBE, ETBE, TAME, TAEE, ethanol, and biobutanol. The presence of these oxygenates reduces the amount of carbon monoxide and unburned fuel in the exhaust. In many areas throughout the U.S., oxygenate blending is mandated by EPA regulations to reduce smog and other airborne pollutants. For example, in Southern California fuel must contain two percent oxygen by weight, resulting in a mixture of 5.6 percent ethanol in gasoline. The resulting fuel is often known as reformulated gasoline (RFG) or oxygenated gasoline, or, in the case of California, California reformulated gasoline (CARBOB). The federal requirement that RFG contain oxygen was dropped in May 2006 because the industry had developed VOC-controlled RFG that did not need additional oxygen.

MTBE was phased out in the U.S. due to groundwater contamination and the resulting regulations and lawsuits. Ethanol and, to a lesser extent, ethanol-derived ETBE are common substitutes. A common ethanol-gasoline mix of 10 percent ethanol mixed with gasoline is called gasohol or E10, and an ethanol-gasoline mix of 85 percent ethanol mixed with gasoline is called E85. The most extensive use of ethanol takes place in Brazil, where the ethanol is derived from sugarcane. In 2004, over 13 billion liters (3.4×10^{9} U.S. gal) of ethanol was produced in the U.S. for fuel use, mostly from corn and sold as E10. E85 is slowly becoming available in much of the U.S., though many of the relatively few stations vending E85 are not open to the general public.

The use of bioethanol and bio-methanol, either directly or indirectly by conversion of ethanol to bio-ETBE, or methanol to bio-MTBE is encouraged by the European Union Directive on the Promotion of the use of biofuels and other renewable fuels for transport. Since producing bioethanol from fermented sugars and starches involves distillation, though, ordinary people in much of Europe cannot legally ferment and distill their own bioethanol at present (unlike in the U.S., where getting a BATF distillation permit has been easy since the 1973 oil crisis).

== Safety ==
HAZMAT class 3 gasoline

=== Toxicity ===
The safety data sheet for a 2003 Texan unleaded gasoline shows at least 15 hazardous chemicals occurring in various amounts, including benzene (up to five percent by volume), toluene (up to 35 percent by volume), naphthalene (up to one percent by volume), trimethylbenzene (up to seven percent by volume), methyl tert-butyl ether (MTBE) (up to 18 percent by volume, in some states), and about 10 others. Hydrocarbons in gasoline generally exhibit low acute toxicities, with LD_{50} of 700–2700 mg/kg for simple aromatic compounds. Benzene and many anti-knocking additives are carcinogenic.

People can be exposed to gasoline in the workplace by swallowing it, breathing in vapours, skin contact, and eye contact. Gasoline is toxic. The National Institute for Occupational Safety and Health (NIOSH) has also designated gasoline as a carcinogen. Physical contact, ingestion, or inhalation can cause health problems. Since ingesting large amounts of gasoline can cause permanent damage to major organs, a call to a local poison control centre or emergency room visit is indicated.

Contrary to common misconception, swallowing gasoline does not generally require special emergency treatment, and inducing vomiting does not help, and can make it worse. According to poison specialist Brad Dahl, "even two mouthfuls wouldn't be that dangerous as long as it goes down to your stomach and stays there or keeps going". The U.S. CDC's Agency for Toxic Substances and Disease Registry says not to induce vomiting, lavage, or administer activated charcoal.

=== Inhalation for intoxication ===
Inhaled (huffed) gasoline vapor is a common intoxicant. Users concentrate and inhale gasoline vapor in a manner not intended by the manufacturer to produce euphoria and intoxication. Gasoline inhalation has become epidemic in some poorer communities and indigenous groups in Australia, Canada, New Zealand, and some Pacific Islands. The practice is thought to cause severe organ damage, along with other effects such as intellectual disability and various cancers.

In Canada, Native children in the isolated Northern Labrador community of Davis Inlet were the focus of national concern in 1993, when many were found to be sniffing gasoline. The Canadian and provincial Newfoundland and Labrador governments intervened on several occasions, sending many children away for treatment. Despite being moved to the new community of Natuashish in 2002, serious inhalant abuse problems have continued. Similar problems were reported in Sheshatshiu in 2000 and also in Pikangikum First Nation. In 2012, the issue once again made the news media in Canada.

Australia has long faced a petrol (gasoline) sniffing problem in isolated and impoverished aboriginal communities. Although some sources argue that sniffing was introduced by U.S. servicemen stationed in the nation's Top End during World War II or through experimentation by 1940s-era Cobourg Peninsula sawmill workers, other sources claim that inhalant abuse, such as glue inhalation, emerged in Australia in the late 1960s. Chronic, heavy petrol sniffing appears to occur among remote, impoverished indigenous communities, where the ready accessibility of petrol has helped to make it a common substance for abuse.

In Australia, petrol sniffing now occurs widely throughout remote Aboriginal communities in the Northern Territory, Western Australia, northern parts of South Australia, and Queensland. The number of people sniffing petrol goes up and down over time as young people experiment or sniff occasionally. "Boss", or chronic, sniffers may move in and out of communities; they are often responsible for encouraging young people to take it up. In 2005, the Government of Australia and BP Australia began the usage of Opal fuel in remote areas prone to petrol sniffing. Opal is a non-sniffable fuel, which is much less likely to cause a high, and has made a difference in some indigenous communities.

=== Flammability ===
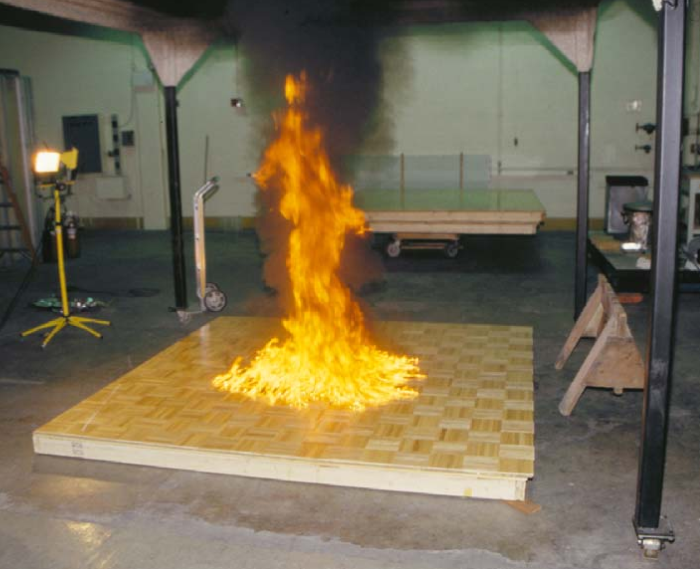
Uncontrolled burning of gasoline produces large quantities of soot and carbon monoxide.

Gasoline is flammable with its lowest flash point from −38 °C (−36 °F) to −43 °C (−45 °F). Gasoline has a lower explosive limit of 1.4 percent by volume and an upper explosive limit of 7.6 percent. If the concentration is below 1.4 percent, the air-gasoline mixture is too lean and does not ignite. If the concentration is above 7.6 percent, the mixture is too rich and also does not ignite. However, gasoline vapor rapidly mixes and spreads with air, making unconstrained gasoline quickly flammable.

=== Gasoline exhaust ===
The exhaust gas generated by burning gasoline is harmful to both the environment and to human health. After CO is inhaled into the human body, it readily combines with haemoglobin in the blood, and its affinity is 300 times that of oxygen. Therefore, the haemoglobin in the lungs combines with CO instead of oxygen, causing the human body to be hypoxic, causing headaches, dizziness, vomiting, and other poisoning symptoms. In severe cases, it may lead to death.

Hydrocarbons only affect the human body when their concentration is quite high, and their toxicity level depends on the chemical composition. The hydrocarbons produced by incomplete combustion include alkanes, aromatics, and aldehydes. Among them, a concentration of methane and ethane over 35 g/m^{3} (0.035 oz/cu ft) will cause loss of consciousness or suffocation, a concentration of pentane and hexane over 45 g/m^{3} (0.045 oz/cu ft) will have an anaesthetic effect, and aromatic hydrocarbons will have more serious effects on health, blood toxicity, neurotoxicity, and cancer. If the concentration of benzene exceeds 40 ppm, it can cause leukaemia, and xylene can cause headache, dizziness, nausea, and vomiting. Human exposure to large amounts of aldehydes can cause eye irritation, nausea, and dizziness. In addition to carcinogenic effects, long-term exposure can cause damage to the skin, liver, kidneys, and cataracts.

After NO_{x} enters the alveoli, it has a severe stimulating effect on the lung tissue. It can irritate the conjunctiva of the eyes, cause tearing, and cause pink eyes. It also has a stimulating effect on the nose, pharynx, throat, and other organs. It can cause acute wheezing, breathing difficulties, red eyes, sore throat, and dizziness causing poisoning. Fine particulates are also dangerous to health.

== Environmental effect ==
The air pollution in many large cities has changed from coal-burning pollution to "motor vehicle pollution". In the U.S., transportation is the largest source of carbon emissions, accounting for 30 percent of the total carbon footprint of the U.S. Combustion of gasoline produces 2.35 kilograms per liter (19.6 lb/U.S. gal) of carbon dioxide, a greenhouse gas.

Unburnt gasoline and evaporation from the tank, when in the atmosphere, react in sunlight to produce photochemical smog. Vapor pressure initially rises with some addition of ethanol to gasoline, but the increase is greatest at 10 percent by volume. At higher concentrations of ethanol above 10 percent, the vapor pressure of the blend starts to decrease. At a 10 percent ethanol by volume, the rise in vapor pressure may potentially increase the problem of photochemical smog.

This rise in vapor pressure could be mitigated by increasing or decreasing the percentage of ethanol in the gasoline mixture. The chief risks of such leaks come not from vehicles, but gasoline delivery truck accidents and leaks from storage tanks. Because of this risk, most (underground) storage tanks now have extensive measures in place to detect and prevent any such leaks, such as monitoring systems (Veeder-Root, Franklin Fueling).

Production of gasoline consumes 1.5 liters per kilometer (0.63 U.S. gal/mi) of water by driven distance.

Gasoline use causes a variety of deleterious effects to the human population and to the climate generally. The harms imposed include a higher rate of premature death and ailments, such as asthma, caused by air pollution, higher healthcare costs for the public generally, decreased crop yields, missed work and school days due to illness, increased flooding and other extreme weather events linked to global climate change, and other social costs. The costs imposed on society and the planet are estimated to be $3.80 per gallon of gasoline, in addition to the price paid at the pump by the user. The damage to the health and climate caused by a gasoline-powered vehicle greatly exceeds that caused by electric vehicles.

Gasoline can be released into the environment as an uncombusted liquid fuel, as a flammable liquid, or as a vapor by way of leakages occurring during its production, handling, transport and delivery. Gasoline contains known carcinogens, and gasoline exhaust is a health risk. Gasoline is often used as a recreational inhalant and can be harmful or fatal when used in such a manner. When burned, one liter (0.26 U.S. gal) of gasoline emits about 2.3 kilograms (5.1 lb) of CO_{2}, a greenhouse gas, contributing to human-caused climate change. Oil products, including gasoline, were responsible for about 32% of CO_{2} emissions worldwide in 2021.

=== Carbon dioxide ===
About 2.353 kilograms per liter (19.64 lb/U.S. gal) of carbon dioxide (CO_{2}) are produced from burning gasoline that does not contain ethanol. Most of the retail gasoline now sold in the U.S. contains about 10 percent fuel ethanol (or E10) by volume. Burning E10 produces about 2.119 kilograms per liter (17.68 lb/U.S. gal) of CO_{2} that is emitted from the fossil fuel content. If the CO_{2} emissions from ethanol combustion are considered, then about 2.271 kilograms per liter (18.95 lb/U.S. gal) of CO_{2} are produced when E10 is combusted.

Worldwide 7 litres of gasoline are burnt for every 100 km driven by cars and vans.

In 2021, the International Energy Agency stated, "To ensure fuel economy and CO_{2} emissions standards are effective, governments must continue regulatory efforts to monitor and reduce the gap between real-world fuel economy and rated performance."

=== Contamination of soil and water ===
Gasoline enters the environment through the soil, groundwater, surface water, and air. Therefore, humans may be exposed to gasoline through methods such as breathing, eating, and skin contact. For example, using gasoline-filled equipment, such as lawnmowers, drinking gasoline-contaminated water close to gasoline spills or leaks to the soil, working at a filling station, inhaling gasoline volatile gas when refuelling at a station is the easiest way to be exposed to gasoline.

== Use and pricing ==
The International Energy Agency said in 2021 that "road fuels should be taxed at a rate that reflects their impact on people's health and the climate".

=== Europe ===
Countries in Europe impose substantially higher taxes on fuels such as gasoline when compared to the U.S. The price of gasoline in Europe is typically higher than that in the U.S. due to this difference.

=== U.S. ===
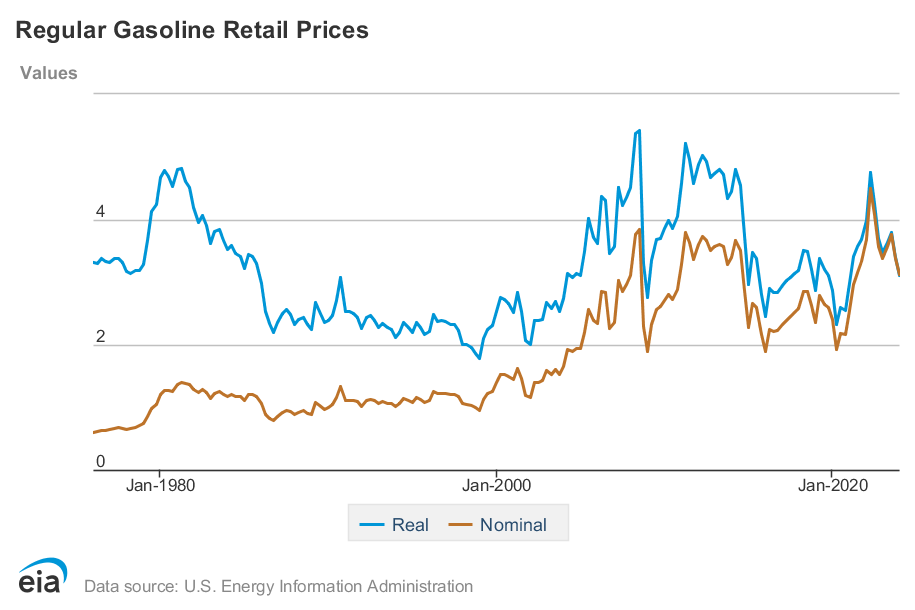
U.S. regular gasoline prices

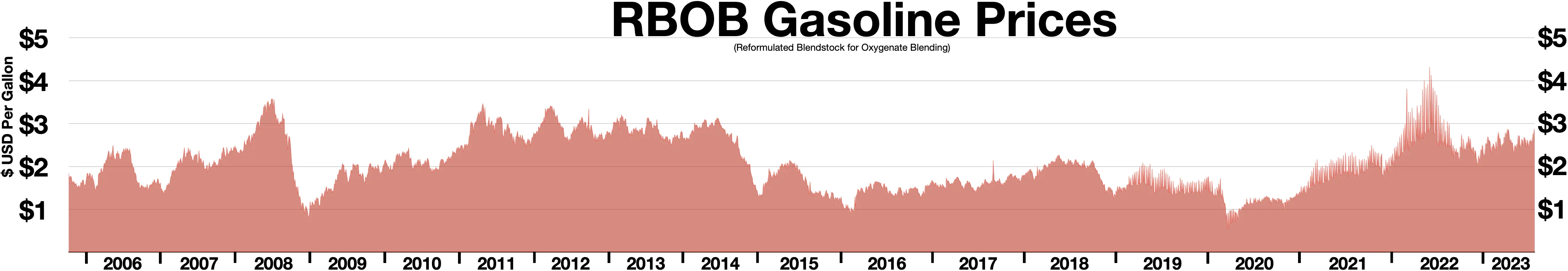
RBOB gasoline prices RBOB plus excise taxes on gasoline reflect prices paid at the pump.

In the United States, retail gasoline prices include taxes, unlike most consumer goods, which are commonly advertised before sales taxes are added. The retail price of gasoline is mainly determined by the cost of crude oil, taxes, refining costs and profits, and distribution and marketing costs. In 2025, the national annual average price of regular-grade gasoline was $0.82 per liter ($3.10/U.S. gal); the EIA estimated that crude oil accounted for about 51% of the retail price, with taxes, refining, and distribution and marketing accounting for the remainder.

Gasoline prices have fluctuated substantially over time. From 1998 to 2004, prices generally ranged between $0.26 and $0.53 per liter ($1 and $2/U.S. gal). They reached about $1.09 per liter ($4.11/U.S. gal) in mid-2008 before falling during the late-2000s recession. After another period of high prices in the early 2010s, prices fell in 2020 during the COVID-19 pandemic and later rose to a nominal high of about $1.3 per liter ($5/U.S. gal) in mid-2022.

Federal, state, and local taxes contribute to gasoline prices. As of January 2026, the federal tax on motor gasoline was $0.049 per liter ($0.184/U.S. gal), including the federal excise tax and the Leaking Underground Storage Tank fee, while state taxes and fees averaged $0.0886 per liter ($0.3355/U.S. gal). The federal motor fuel excise tax is deposited into the Highway Trust Fund.

Prices also vary by region. California prices are generally higher and more volatile than those in most other states because relatively few refineries produce the state's required blend of gasoline, California's reformulated gasoline program is more stringent than the federal program, and its gasoline taxes are higher than those of most states.

Gasoline is sold in regular, midgrade, and premium grades, which differ primarily by octane rating. Higher-octane gasoline is more resistant to engine knocking and is typically more expensive. In 2025, the national annual average price of premium-grade gasoline was about $0.25 per liter ($0.93/U.S. gal) higher than regular-grade gasoline.

The price of gasoline varies seasonally. Summer-grade gasoline has lower vapor pressure to reduce evaporation, ozone formation, and smog in warm weather, while winter-grade gasoline has higher vapor pressure to improve cold-weather starting.

== Gasoline production by country ==
Gasoline production (per day; 2014)
Country	Gasoline production			
Country	Barrels	US Gallons	Imperial Gallons	Megalitres
U.S.	9,571 thousand	402.0×10^{6}	334.7×10^{6}	1,521.7
China	2,578 thousand	108.3×10^{6}	90.2×10^{6}	409.9
Japan	920 thousand	39×10^{6}	32×10^{6}	146
Russia	910 thousand	38×10^{6}	32×10^{6}	145
India	755 thousand	31.7×10^{6}	26.4×10^{6}	120.0
Canada	671 thousand	28.2×10^{6}	23.5×10^{6}	106.7
Brazil	533 thousand	22.4×10^{6}	18.6×10^{6}	84.7
Germany	465 thousand	19.5×10^{6}	16.3×10^{6}	73.9
Saudi Arabia	441 thousand	18.5×10^{6}	15.4×10^{6}	70.1
Mexico	407 thousand	17.1×10^{6}	14.2×10^{6}	64.7
South Korea	397 thousand	16.7×10^{6}	13.9×10^{6}	63.1
Iran	382 thousand	16.0×10^{6}	13.4×10^{6}	60.7
UK	364 thousand	15.3×10^{6}	12.7×10^{6}	57.9
Italy	343 thousand	14.4×10^{6}	12.0×10^{6}	54.5
Venezuela	277 thousand	11.6×10^{6}	9.7×10^{6}	44.0
France	265 thousand	11.1×10^{6}	9.3×10^{6}	42.1
Singapore	249 thousand	10.5×10^{6}	8.7×10^{6}	39.6
Australia	241 thousand	10.1×10^{6}	8.4×10^{6}	38.3
Indonesia	230 thousand	9.7×10^{6}	8.0×10^{6}	37
Taiwan	174 thousand	7.3×10^{6}	6.1×10^{6}	27.7
Thailand	170 thousand	7.1×10^{6}	5.9×10^{6}	27
Spain	169 thousand	7.1×10^{6}	5.9×10^{6}	26.9
Netherlands	148 thousand	6.2×10^{6}	5.2×10^{6}	23.5
South Africa	135 thousand	5.7×10^{6}	4.7×10^{6}	21.5
Argentina	122 thousand	5.1×10^{6}	4.3×10^{6}	19.4
Sweden	112 thousand	4.7×10^{6}	3.9×10^{6}	17.8
Greece	108 thousand	4.5×10^{6}	3.8×10^{6}	17.2
Belgium	105 thousand	4.4×10^{6}	3.7×10^{6}	16.7
Malaysia	103 thousand	4.3×10^{6}	3.6×10^{6}	16.4
Finland	100 thousand	4.2×10^{6}	3.5×10^{6}	16
Belarus	92 thousand	3.9×10^{6}	3.2×10^{6}	14.6
Turkey	92 thousand	3.9×10^{6}	3.2×10^{6}	14.6
Colombia	85 thousand	3.6×10^{6}	3.0×10^{6}	13.5
Poland	83 thousand	3.5×10^{6}	2.9×10^{6}	13.2
Norway	77 thousand	3.2×10^{6}	2.7×10^{6}	12.2
Kazakhstan	71 thousand	3.0×10^{6}	2.5×10^{6}	11.3
Algeria	70 thousand	2.9×10^{6}	2.4×10^{6}	11
Romania	70 thousand	2.9×10^{6}	2.4×10^{6}	11
Oman	69 thousand	2.9×10^{6}	2.4×10^{6}	11.0
Egypt	66 thousand	2.8×10^{6}	2.3×10^{6}	10.5
UAE	66 thousand	2.8×10^{6}	2.3×10^{6}	10.5
Chile	65 thousand	2.7×10^{6}	2.3×10^{6}	10.3
Turkmenistan	61 thousand	2.6×10^{6}	2.1×10^{6}	9.7
Kuwait	57 thousand	2.4×10^{6}	2.0×10^{6}	9.1
Iraq	56 thousand	2.4×10^{6}	2.0×10^{6}	8.9
Vietnam	52 thousand	2.2×10^{6}	1.8×10^{6}	8.3
Lithuania	49 thousand	2.1×10^{6}	1.7×10^{6}	7.8
Denmark	48 thousand	2.0×10^{6}	1.7×10^{6}	7.6
Qatar	46 thousand	1.9×10^{6}	1.6×10^{6}	7.3

== Comparison with other fuels ==
Below is a table of the energy density per volume and specific energy, per mass, of various transportation fuels as compared with gasoline. In the rows with gross and net, they are from the Oak Ridge National Laboratory's Transportation Energy Data Book.

Fuel type	Energy density				Specific energy				RON
Fuel type	Gross		Net		Gross		Net		RON
Fuel type	MJ/L	BTU / U.S. gal	MJ/L	BTU / U.S. gal	MJ/kg	BTU/lb	MJ/kg	BTU/lb	RON
Gasoline	34.8	125,000	32.2	115,400	44.4	19,100	41.1	17,700	91–98
Autogas (LPG) (Note: Consisting mostly of C3 and C4 hydrocarbons)	26.8	96,000			46	20,000			108
Ethanol	21.2	76,000	21.1	75,700	26.8	11,500	26.7	11,500	108.7
Methanol	17.9	64,000	15.8	56,600	22.6	9,700	19.9	8,600	123
Butanol	29.2	105,000			36.6	15,700			91–99
Gasohol	31.2	112,000	31.3	112,400					93–94
Diesel (Note: Diesel fuel is not used in a gasoline engine, so its low octane rating is not an issue; the relevant metric for diesel engines is the cetane number.)	38.6	138,000	35.9	128,700	45.4	19,500	42.2	18,100	25
Biodiesel	33.3–35.7	119,000–128,000	32.6	117,100					
Avgas	33.5	120,000	31	112,000	46.8	20,100	43.3	18,600	
Jet A	35.1	126,000			43.8	18,800			
Jet B	35.5	127,500	33.1	118,700					
LNG	25.3	91,000			55	24,000			
LPG	25.4	91,300	23.3	83,500	46.1	19,800	42.3	18,200	
CGH_{2} (Note: At −253.2 °C (−423.8 °F))	10.1	36,000	0.036	130	142	61,000	0.506	218	

== See also ==
- Biogasoline – Gasoline produced from biomass
- Fuel saving device – Product sold in the automotive aftermarket
- Gas to liquids (GTL) – Conversion of natural gas to liquid petroleum products
- Gasoline gallon equivalent (GGE) – Amount of an alternative fuel with equal energy content
- Hydrogen economy – Using hydrogen to decarbonize more sectors
- Jerrycan – Robust pressed steel liquid container
- Natural-gas condensate – Low-density mixture of hydrocarbon liquids
- Synthetic fuel – Fuel from carbon monoxide and hydrogen
- World oil market chronology from 2003 – Chronology of events affecting the oil market
- List of automotive fuel retailers
