= T2 Laboratories explosion and fire =

2007 explosion and fire in Jacksonville, Florida

Coordinates: 30°26′02″N 81°34′05″W

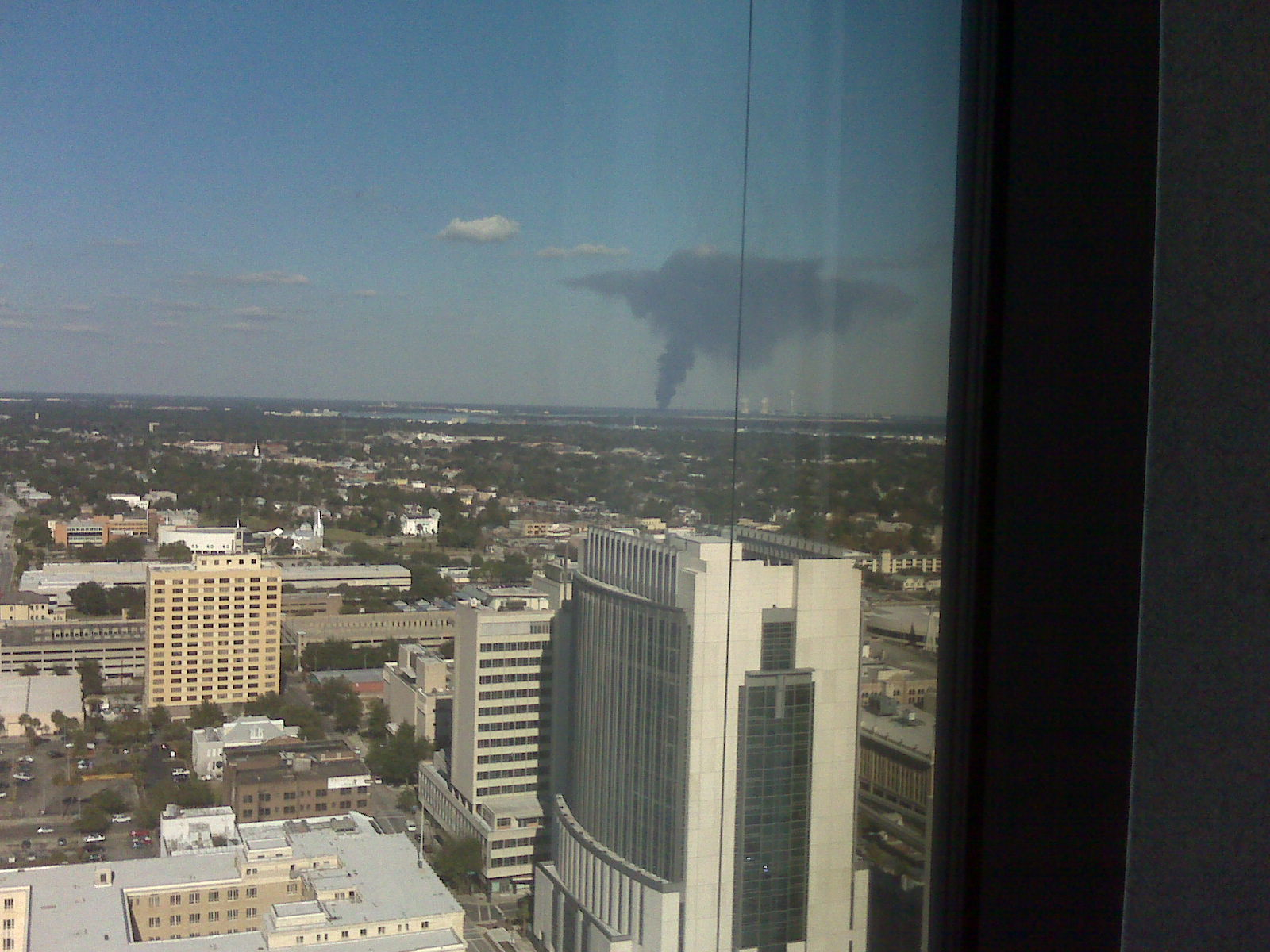
- View from Downtown Jacksonville
- Date: December 19, 2007
- Venue: T2 Laboratories Inc.
- Location: Jacksonville, Florida
- Type: Explosion, Industrial disaster
- Deaths: 4
- Injuries: 14

The T2 Laboratories explosion and fire occurred on December 19, 2007, in Jacksonville, Florida, resulting in the deaths of four people and the injury of fourteen others. T2 Laboratories Inc. was a facility that specialized in the manufacture of specialty chemicals primarily for gasoline additives.

The explosion's force was equivalent to detonating 1,400 lb (640 kg) of TNT and it spread debris up to 1 mi (1.6 km) from the plant. Following the explosion, every HAZMAT unit in Jacksonville and over 100 firefighters fought the ensuing blaze, which a spokesman termed a "hellish inferno".

View of explosion from Blount Island

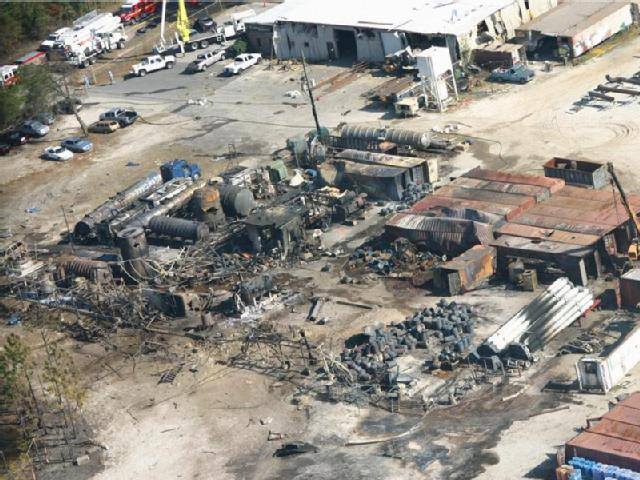
Aerial view of T2 Laboratories, Inc., following explosion and fire

The blast killed Robert Scott Gallagher, 49; Charles Budds Bolchoz, 48; Karey Renard Henry, 35; and Parrish Lamar Ashley, 36. At the time of his death, Gallagher was Marketing Director for T2 Labs. Fourteen people were hospitalized for chemical exposure or their injuries after the blast. The company laid off workers and shut down in the following months.

In September 2009, a report was released by the U.S. Chemical Safety and Hazard Investigation Board as to the cause of the accident. The explosion occurred in a 2,500 US gal (9,500 L) batch reactor during production of methylcyclopentadienyl manganese tricarbonyl (MCMT). The reactor cooling system, which lacked backup systems, failed; this led to a thermal runaway. Pressures rapidly reached 400 psi (28 bar), bursting the reactor's rupture disc, but this was insufficient to slow the runaway reaction. Nearby witnesses described a jet engine-like sound as high pressure gases vented from the reactor. At the same time pressure increased in the reactor, temperatures also increased in the reactor until the solvent (diglyme) reached decomposition temperature. The pressure and temperature continued to increase until the reactor violently detonated. Damage from the explosion was severe enough that 4 buildings in the immediate vicinity of the plant were condemned.
