= PIBA =

PIBA might refer to:

- Population and Immigration Authority
- Polyisobuteneamine
