= MCMT =

MCMT may refer to:

- DNMT1, a human gene
- Methylcyclopentadienyl manganese tricarbonyl, a gasoline additive to increase the fuel's octane rating.
