= Methylcyclopentadienyl manganese tricarbonyl =

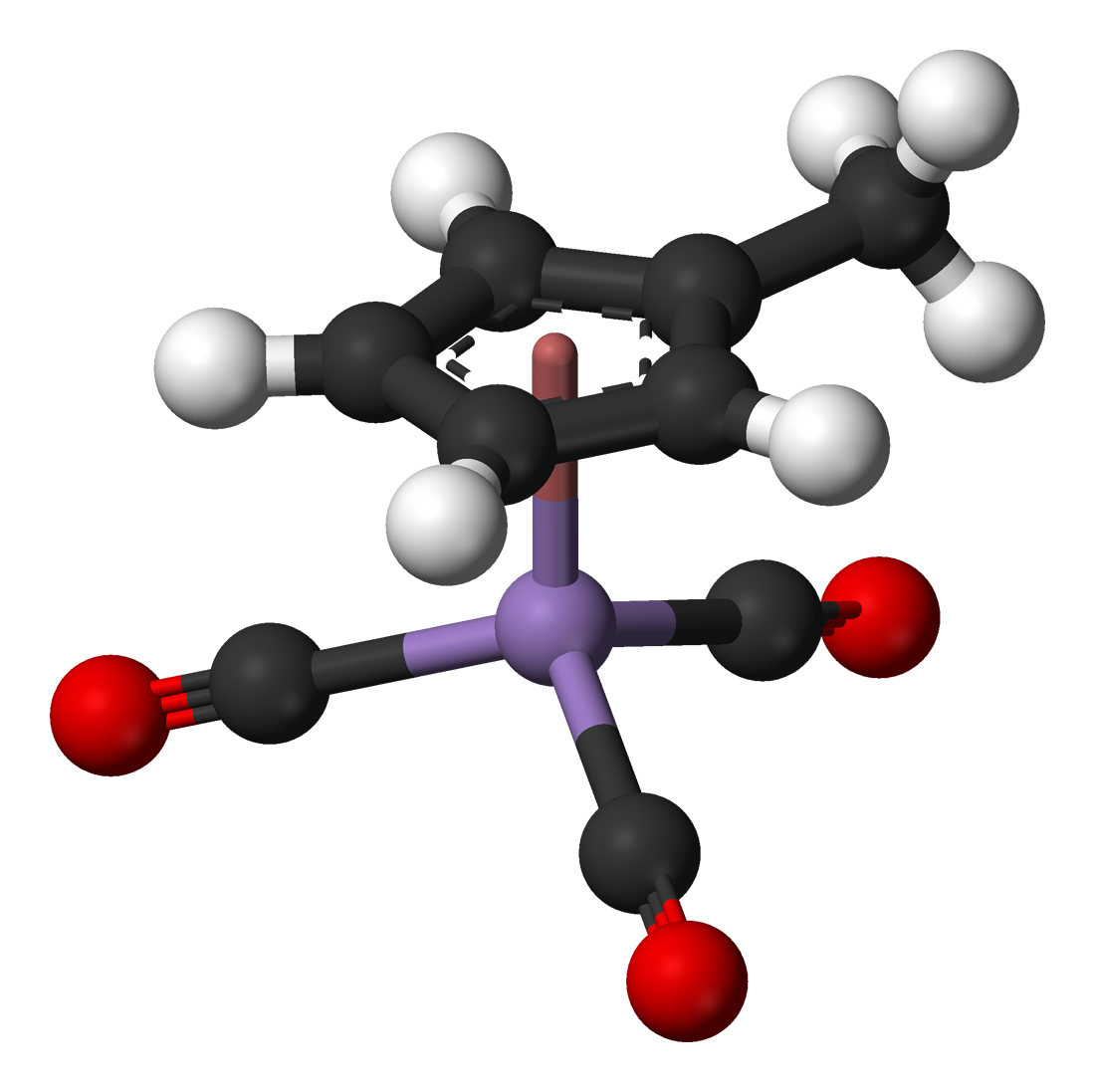

Names
- IUPAC name tricarbonyl(methyl-η^{5}-cyclopentadienyl)manganese
- Other names MMT, CI-2, Combustion Improver-2, Manganese tricarbonylmethylcyclopentadienyl, 2-Methylcyclopentadienyl manganese tricarbonyl

Identifiers
| CAS Number | 12108-13-3 |
| 3D model (JSmol) | Interactive image |
| ChemSpider | 23801 |
| ECHA InfoCard | 100.031.957 |
| EC Number | 235-166-5 |
| PubChem CID | 11986208 |
| RTECS number | OP1450000 |
| UNII | 1E52JN2L3I |
| UN number | 3281 |
| CompTox Dashboard (EPA) | DTXSID9027738 |
- InChI: InChI=1S/C6H7.3CO.Mn/c1-6-4-2-3-5-6;3*1-2;/h2-5H,1H3;;;;/q-1;;;; Key: IYSGJCJSRBFZSZ-UHFFFAOYSA-N
- SMILES: CC1=C[CH-]C=C1.[O+]#C[Mn-2](C#[O+])C#[O+]

Properties
| Chemical formula | C_{9}H_{7}MnO_{3} |
| Molar mass | 218.09 g/mol |
| Appearance | pale yellow to dark orange liquid |
| Odor | faint, pleasant |
| Density | 1.38 g/cm^{3} |
| Melting point | −1 °C (30 °F; 272 K) |
| Boiling point | 232 to 233 °C (450 to 451 °F; 505 to 506 K) |
| Solubility in water | low |
| Solubility | Hydrocarbons (petrol), ether, alcohol, THF |
| Vapor pressure | 7 mmHg (100°C) |

Structure
| Coordination geometry | Tetrahedral at Mn |

Hazards
- Occupational safety and health (OHS/OSH)
| Main hazards | Flammable, toxic |
- GHS labelling
| Pictograms | (GHS06: Toxic) (GHS09: Environmental hazard) |
| Signal word | Danger |
| Hazard statements | H301, H310, H315, H330, H372, H410 |
| Precautionary statements | P260, P273, P280, P284, P301+P310, P302+P350 |
| Flash point | 110 °C; 230 °F; 383 K |
- NIOSH (US health exposure limits)
| PEL (Permissible) | C 5 mg/m^{3} |
| REL (Recommended) | TWA 0.2 mg/m^{3} [skin] |
| IDLH (Immediate danger) | N.D. |

Related compounds
| Related compounds | ferrocene Mn_{2}(CO)_{10} dicyclopentadiene |
- Except where otherwise noted, data are given for materials in their standard state (at 25 °C [77 °F], 100 kPa). verify (what is ?) Infobox references

Methylcyclopentadienyl manganese tricarbonyl (MMT or MCMT) is an organomanganese compound with the formula (C_{5}H_{4}CH_{3})Mn(CO)_{3}. Initially marketed as a supplement for use in leaded gasoline, MMT was later used in unleaded gasoline to increase the octane rating. Following the implementation of the Clean Air Act (United States) (CAA) in 1970, MMT continued to be used alongside tetraethyl lead (TEL) in the US as leaded gasoline was phased out (prior to TEL finally being banned from US gasoline in 1995), and was also used in unleaded gasoline until 1977. Ethyl Corporation obtained a waiver from the U.S. EPA (Environmental Protection Agency) in 1995, which allows the use of MMT in US unleaded gasoline (not including reformulated gasoline) at a treat rate equivalent to 8.3 mg Mn/L (manganese per liter).

MMT has been used in Canadian gasoline since 1976 (and in numerous other countries for many years) at a concentration up to 8.3 mg Mn/L (though the importation and interprovincial trade of gasoline containing MMT was restricted briefly during the period 1997–1998) and was introduced into Australia in 2000. It has been sold under the tradenames HiTEC 3000, Cestoburn and Ecotane. MMT is also used in China.

== History of usage in the United States ==
Although initially marketed in 1958 as a smoke suppressant for gas turbines, MMT was further developed as an octane enhancer in 1974. When the United States Environmental Protection Agency (EPA) ordered the phase out of TEL in gasoline in 1973, new fuel additives were sought. TEL has been used in certain countries as an additive to increase the octane rating of automotive gasoline but has been phased out in all countries since July 2021.

In 1977, the US Congress amended the CAA to require advance approval by the EPA for the continued use of fuel additives such as MMT, ethanol, ethyl tert-butyl ether (ETBE), etc. The new CAA amendment required a "waiver" to allow use of fuel additives made of any elements other than carbon, hydrogen, oxygen (within certain limits) and nitrogen. To obtain a waiver, the applicant was required to demonstrate that the fuel additive would not lead to a failure of vehicle emission control systems.

Ethyl Corporation applied to the US EPA for a waiver for MMT in both 1978 and 1981; in both cases the applications were denied because of stated concerns that MMT might damage catalytic converters and increase hydrocarbon emissions. In 1988, Ethyl began a new series of discussions with the EPA to determine a program for developing the necessary data to support a waiver application. In 1990, Ethyl filed its third waiver application prompting an extensive four-year review process. In 1993, the U.S. EPA determined that use of MMT at 8.3 mg Mn/L would not cause, or contribute to, vehicle emission control system failures.

Despite that finding, the EPA ultimately denied the waiver request in 1994 due to uncertainty related to health concerns regarding manganese emissions from the use of MMT.

As a result of this ruling, Ethyl initiated a legal action claiming that the EPA had exceeded its authority by denying the waiver on these grounds. This was upheld by the US Court of Appeals and EPA subsequently granted a waiver which allows the use of MMT in US unleaded gasoline (not including reformulated gasoline) at a treat rate equivalent to 8.3 mg Mn/L.

Implementation of this alternative to TEL has been controversial. Manganese compounds have, in general, very low toxicity, but their combustion products still irreversibly foul catalytic converters. Opposition from automobile manufacturers and some areas of the scientific community has reportedly prompted oil companies to stop voluntarily the usage of MMT in some of their countries of operation.

MMT is currently manufactured in the U.S. by the Afton Chemical Corporation, a subsidiary of New Market Corporation. It is also produced and marketed as Cestoburn by Cestoil Chemical Inc. in Canada.

== Structure and synthesis ==
MMT is manufactured by reduction of bis(methylcyclopentadienyl) manganese using triethylaluminium. The reduction is conducted under an atmosphere of carbon monoxide.

MMT is a so-called half-sandwich complex, or more specifically a "piano-stool" complex (since the three CO ligands are like the legs of a stool). The manganese atom in MMT is coordinated with three carbonyl groups as well as to all five main carbon atoms of the methylcyclopentadienyl ring. These hydrophobic organic ligands make MMT highly lipophilic.

A variety of related complexes are known, including ferrocene, which has also been used as an additive to gasoline. Many derivatives of MMT are known.

== Safety ==
MMT can impact human and environmental through direct exposure to the compound or exposure to its combustion products. MMT itself photodegrades rapidly, and the Australian National Industrial Chemicals Notification and Assessment Scheme (NICNAS) concluded that there is "low occupational risk associated with MMT" both "for workers involved in formulating and distributing LRP or aftermarket fuel additives and those involved in automotive maintenance". Further, they also concluded that there is a "low risk" to the public from the use of MMT. Regulatory agencies, including NICNAS and Health Canada, have generally concluded that manganese-containing combustion products (manganese phosphate, manganese sulfate and manganese dioxide) from MMT are unlikely to generate significant health impacts.

In 2013, ARCADIS Consulting prepared a report on MMT during the implementation of a European Fuel Quality Directive (2009/30/EC). The conclusions of a risk assessment are that "for MMT and its transformation products, when MMT is used as a fuel additive in petrol, no significant human health or environmental concerns related to exposure to either MMT or its transformation [combustion] products (manganese phosphate, manganese sulfate and manganese tetroxide [sic]) were identified at use at levels up to 18 mg Mn/L. Depending on the regional needs and the vehicle emission control technology available, an MMT treat rate in the range of 8.3 mg Mn/L to 18 mg Mn/L is scientifically justified and may deliver both environmental and economic benefits without significant adverse effects."

=== Pre-combustion storage and handling ===
The general public has minimal direct exposure to MMT. As stated by the US EPA in their risk assessment on MMT, "except for accidental or occupational contacts, exposure to MMT itself was not thought likely to pose a significant risk to the general population." Similarly, NICNAS stated that "[m]inimal public exposure to MMT is likely as a result of spills and splashes of LRP [lead replacement petrol] and aftermarket additives". The US ATSDR (Agency for Toxic Substances and Disease Registry) notes that MMT is very unstable in light and degrades to a mixture of less harmful substances and inorganic manganese in less than 2 minutes. Therefore, human exposure to MMT prior to combustion in gasoline would not likely occur at significant levels.

The MMT dossier registered in the European Chemical Agency's webpage indicates that before combustion in gasoline, MMT is classified as an acute toxicant by the oral, dermal, and inhalation routes of exposure under the European Union's Classification, Labeling and Packaging Regulation (EC/1272/2008), implementing the Global Harmonized System (GHS) of Classification and Labeling. The US OSHA (Occupational Health and Safety Administration) has not established a permissible exposure limit specifically for MMT. However, OSHA has set a permissible exposure limit at a ceiling of 5 mg/m^{3} for manganese and its compounds, while the National Institute for Occupational Safety and Health recommends workers not be exposed to more than 0.2 mg/m^{3}, over an eight-hour time-weighted average. In Europe, the MMT DNELs (Derived No Effect Level) for workers by the inhalation and dermal routes of exposure are 0.6 mg/m^{3} and 0.11 mg/kg-day, respectively. The MMT DNELs for the general population by the inhalation and dermal routes of exposure are 0.11 mg/m^{3} and 0.062 mg/kg-day, respectively.

=== Combustion products ===
In 1994 (reaffirmed in 1998, 2001 and 2010), Health Canada concluded that "airborne manganese resulting from the combustion of MMT in gasoline powered vehicles is not entering the Canadian environment in quantities or under conditions that may constitute a health risk" and confirmed they were taking no action with respect to MMT. Similarly, the 2003 NICNAS report states that the airborne concentrations of manganese as a result of car emissions from vehicles using fuel containing MMT poses no health hazard.

The assessment conducted by NICNAS notes that "[m]anganese, the principle degradation by-product from combustion of MMT, is naturally occurring and ubiquitous in the environment. It is an essential nutrient of plants and animals. Environmental exposure to Mn compounds will mostly arise through the gaseous phase. Eventually, these will deposit to land and waters. The emission of Mn into the environment from use of fuels containing MMT is unlikely to develop to levels of concern and therefore poses a low risk for terrestrial or aquatic environments."

Additional health studies, overseen by the US EPA, were conducted to explain the transport of manganese in the body. In studies published from 2007 through 2011, no significant health effects are anticipated from the use of MMT in gasoline.

== T2 Laboratories explosion and fire ==
On December 19, 2007 an explosion and fire occurred in the production of MMT in Florida, which killed four people and injured fourteen.

== See also ==
- List of gasoline additives
