= Tert-Amyl methyl ether =

tert-Amyl methyl ether

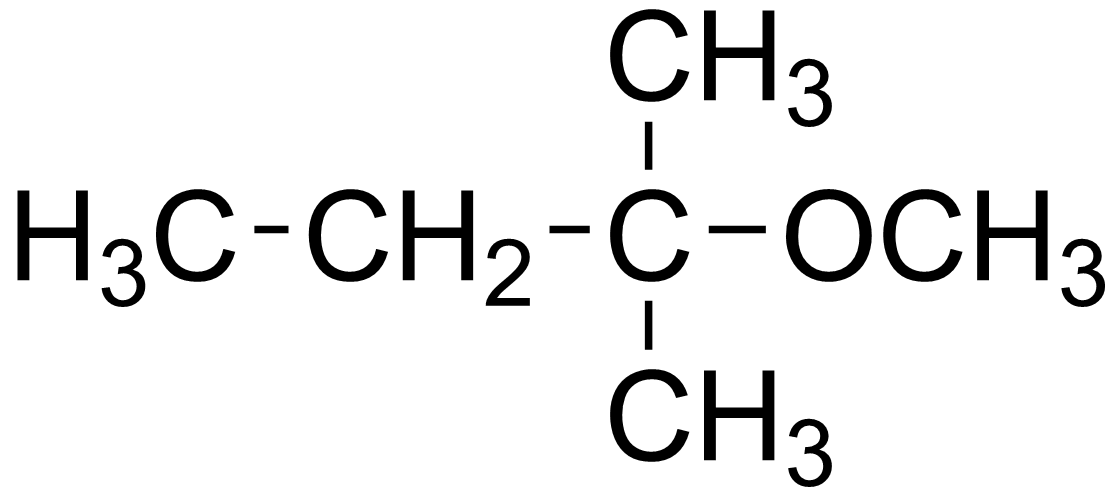

Names
- Preferred IUPAC name 2-Methoxy-2-methylbutane
- Other names tertiary-Amyl methyl ether TAME; Methoxypentane; 2-methoxy-2-methylbutane 1,1-Dimethylpropyl methyl ether Methyl tert-pentyl ether Methyl tert-Amyl ether 2-Methyl-2-methoxybutane; Methyl 2-methyl-2-butyl ether tert-Pentyl methyl ether Tertiary amyl methyl ether Methyl 1,1-dimethylpropyl ether

Identifiers
CAS Number	994-05-8
3D model (JSmol)	Interactive image
Abbreviations	TAME
ChemSpider	55188
ECHA InfoCard	100.012.374
PubChem CID	61247
UNII	94525J1AP8
CompTox Dashboard (EPA)	DTXSID8024521
- InChI: InChI=1S/C6H14O/c1-5-6(2,3)7-4/h5H2,1-4H3 Key: HVZJRWJGKQPSFL-UHFFFAOYSA-N; InChI=1/C6H14O/c1-5-6(2,3)7-4/h5H2,1-4H3 Key: HVZJRWJGKQPSFL-UHFFFAOYAC
- SMILES: O(C(C)(C)CC)C

Properties
Chemical formula	C_{6}H_{14}O
Molar mass	102.177 g·mol^{−1}
Appearance	Colorless liquid
Density	0.76–0.78 g/mL
Melting point	−80 °C (−112 °F; 193 K)
Boiling point	86.3 °C (187.3 °F; 359.4 K)
Solubility in water	10.71 g/L at 20 °C
Refractive index (n_{D})	1.3896

Hazards
Flash point	−11 °C (12 °F; 262 K)
Autoignition temperature	430 °C (806 °F; 703 K)
Explosive limits	1.0-7.1%
- Except where otherwise noted, data are given for materials in their standard state (at 25 °C [77 °F], 100 kPa). verify (what is ?) Infobox references

tert-Amyl methyl ether (TAME) is an organic compound with the formula CH_{3}CH_{2}(CH_{3})_{2}COCH_{3}. A colorless liquid, it is classified as an ether. It is used as a fuel oxygenate. Unlike most ethers, it does not require a stabilizer as it does not form peroxides on storage.

== Uses ==
TAME is mostly used as an oxygenate to gasoline. It is added for three reasons: to increase octane enhancement, to replace banned tetraethyl lead, and to raise the oxygen content in gasoline. It is known that TAME in fuel reduces exhaust emissions of some volatile organic compounds.

TAME is a potential as an environmentally friendly alternative to some of the classic ether solvents. It is characterized by a high boiling point (86 °C) and a low freezing point (−80 °C), allowing a wide range of reaction temperatures. TAME can be used as a safe reaction medium (e.g. condensation reactions, coupling reactions, such as Grignard reactions and Suzuki reactions, as well as metal hydride reductions) and as an extraction solvent to replace dichloromethane, aromatics, and other ethers.

== Synthesis ==
TAME derives from C5 distillation fractions of naphtha. It has an ethereous odor. Specifically, it is produced by the acid-catalyzed etherification of methanol with isoamylenes, primarily 2-methyl-1-butene and 2-methyl-2-butene, which are typically obtained from C_{5} hydrocarbon streams generated during petroleum refining and steam cracking operations.

The synthesis is generally carried out in the liquid phase using strongly acidic ion-exchange resins, particularly sulfonated polystyrene-based catalysts. The etherification reaction proceeds through electrophilic addition of methanol to the tertiary carbocation intermediate formed by protonation of the isoamylene double bond.

The principal reactions are:

CH_{3}OH + CH_{2}=C(CH_{3})CH_{2}CH_{3} → CH_{3}OC(CH_{3})_{2}CH_{2}CH_{3}

and

CH_{3}OH + CH_{3}CH=C(CH_{3})CH_{3} → CH_{3}OC(CH_{3})_{2}CH_{2}CH_{3}

Industrial synthesis is typically performed at moderate temperatures and elevated pressures in order to maintain the reactants in the liquid phase and improve equilibrium conversion. Side reactions may include methanol dehydration to dimethyl ether and oligomerization of isoamylenes under strongly acidic conditions. Commercial production of TAME expanded during the late twentieth century owing to its application as an oxygenated gasoline additive used to improve octane ratings and reduce carbon monoxide emissions from internal combustion engines.

== Toxicity ==
TAME was evaluated in 4-week rat inhalation studies sponsored by Amoco Corporation. Target vapor concentrations were 0, 500, 2000, or 4000 ppm for 6 h per day, 5 days per week, for 4 weeks. Exposure at 4000 ppm resulted in 25% mortality, apparently as a consequence of severe CNS depression. Body weight gain was decreased in the TAME high dose male rats. Significant effects on functional observational battery (FOB) parameters were only found in the high and mid-dose groups immediately after exposure. All affected FOB parameters were normal by the next day. TAME exposure significantly increased relative liver weights in the high and mid-dose groups. However, no treatment-related histopathologic findings were noted for the compound. Clinical chemistry and hematology findings were minimal with TAME exposure. The results indicate that 500 ppm was a NOAEL for TAME in these studies.

== Other properties ==
Relative vapor density (air = 1): 3.6

Vapor Pressure 75.2 [mmHg]

log Kow = 1.55 at 20 °C

Henry's Law constant = 1.32X10-3 atm-cu m/mol at 25 °C

Stability / Shelf Life: Stable under recommended storage conditions.

Autoignition Temperature: 415 °C

Decomposition: When heated to decomposition it emits acrid smoke and irritating vapors.

Odor Threshold: 0.02 [mmHg]

=== Kovats retention index ===
- Standard non-polar 672.5, 674, 673, 669.3, 666
- Semi-standard non-polar 678, 655, 668.3
- Standard polar 790, 802.9

== See also ==
- Methyl tert-butyl ether
- Ethyl tert-butyl ether
- List of gasoline additives
