= Polyisobuteneamine =

Polymer

Polyisobuteneamine (PIBA) is a polymer derived from the reaction of polyisobutylene (PIB) with ammonia or primary amines. This polymeric compound is known for its excellent adhesive and dispersant properties and is commonly used as an additive in lubricants, fuel, and other industrial applications.

== History of discovery ==
The history of polyisobuteneamine dates back to the early development and study of polyisobutylene. The first synthesis of polyisobutylene was reported in 1931 by the German chemists Hermann Staudinger and Leonidas Zechmeister, who obtained the polymer through the cationic polymerization of isobutylene. The discovery of polyisobuteneamine followed as researchers began to explore the potential applications of polyisobutylene and its derivatives.

== Synthesis ==
Polyisobuteneamine is synthesized through the reaction of polyisobutylene with ammonia or primary amines in the presence of a catalyst. The reaction takes place at elevated temperatures and pressures. The molecular weight of the resulting polymer can be controlled by adjusting the reaction conditions and the choice of catalyst.

Polyisobutylene (PIB): (CH_{2}=C(CH_{3})_{2})_{n} Ammonia (NH_{3}) or Primary amine (RNH_{2})

Polyisobuteneamine (PIBA): [-(CH_{2}-C(CH_{3})_{2})N(H)-]_{m}

In the chemical formulas above, n represents the degree of polymerization of PIB, R represents a hydrogen atom (in the case of ammonia) or an alkyl group (in the case of primary amines), and m is the degree of substitution of the amine group on the polyisobutylene backbone.

== Properties ==
Polyisobuteneamine is a viscous liquid with a yellow to amber color. It has excellent adhesion and dispersant properties, which are attributed to its polar amine groups and nonpolar polyisobutylene backbone. The unique combination of polar and nonpolar groups allows PIBA to interact with a wide range of materials, making it a versatile additive.

== Applications ==
Polyisobuteneamine is commonly used as an additive in lubricants, fuel, and other industrial applications. Its adhesive and dispersant properties make it particularly useful in enhancing the performance of engine oils, gear oils, and hydraulic fluids. PIBA is also used in fuel additives to improve the combustion process and reduce deposits in the engine. Other applications include the use of PIBA as a corrosion inhibitor, an emulsifier, and a demulsifier in various industrial processes.
