= Oxygenate =

Chemical compounds containing oxygen often used as fuel additives

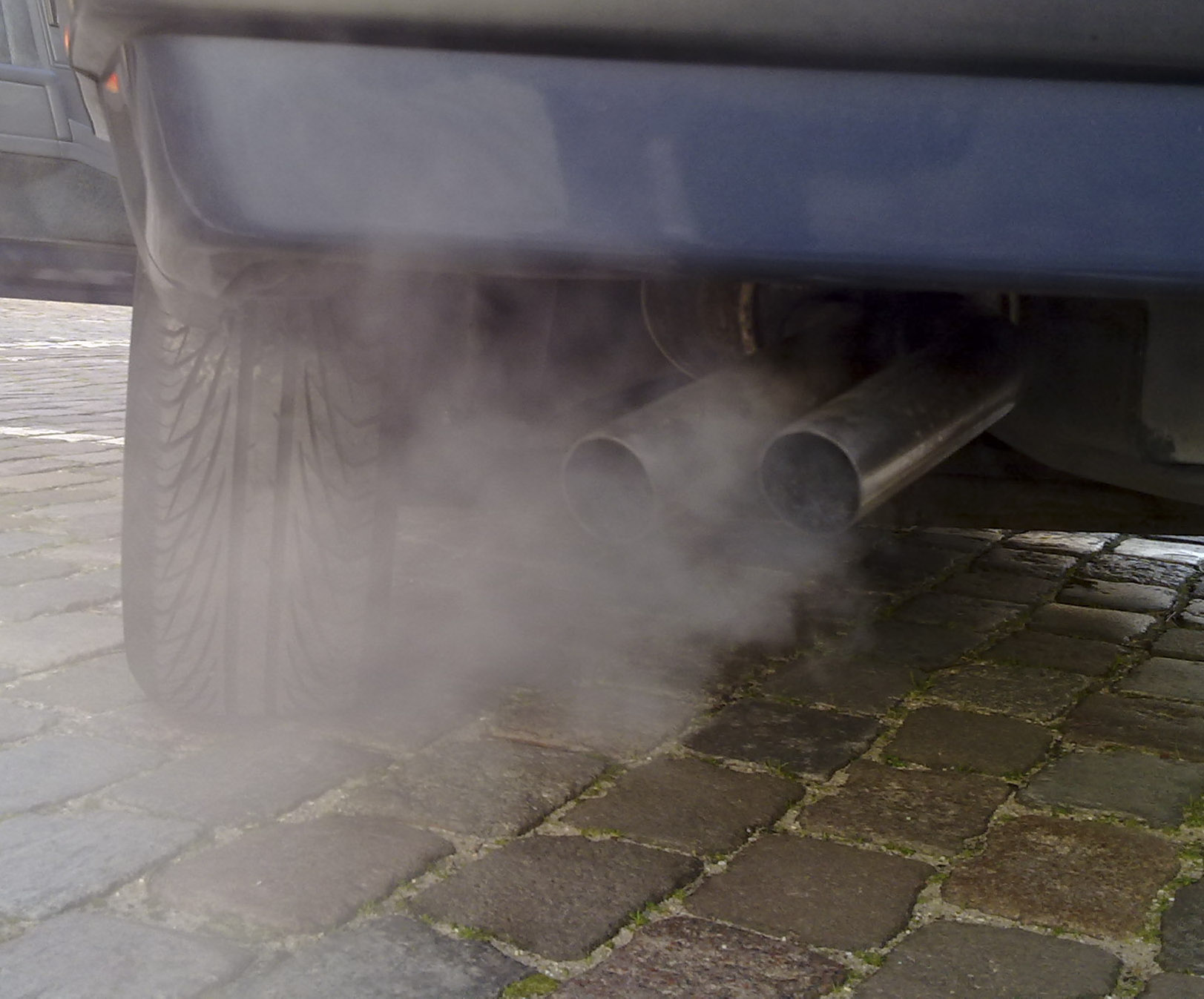
Automobile exhaust

In the liquid fuel industry, oxygenates are hydrocarbon-derived fuel additives containing at least one oxygen atom to promote complete combustion. Absent oxygenates, fuel combustion is usually incomplete, and the exhaust stream pollutes the air with carbon monoxide, soot particles, aromatic and polyaromatic hydrocarbons, and nitrated polyaromatic hydrocarbons.

The most common oxygenates are either alcohols or ethers, but ketones and aldehydes are also included in this distinction. Carboxylic acids and esters can be grouped with oxygenates in the simple definition that they contain at least one oxygen atom. However, they are usually unwanted in oils, and therefore likely fuels, due to their environmental toxicity and tendency to cause catalyst poisoning and corrosion during oil production and refining.

- Alcohols:
  - Methanol (MeOH)
  - Ethanol (EtOH); see also Common ethanol fuel mixtures
  - Isopropyl alcohol (IPA)
  - n-Butanol (BuOH)
  - Gasoline grade tert-butanol (GTBA)
- Ethers:
  - Methyl tert-butyl ether (MTBE)
  - tert-Amyl methyl ether (TAME)
  - tert-Hexyl methyl ether (THEME)
  - Ethyl tert-butyl ether (ETBE)
  - tert-Amyl ethyl ether (TAEE)
  - Diisopropyl ether (DIPE)

== In the United States ==
In the United States, the Environmental Protection Agency (EPA) had authority to mandate that minimum proportions of oxygenates be added to automotive gasoline on regional and seasonal basis from 1992 until 2006 in an attempt to reduce air pollution, in particular ground-level ozone and smog. As of 2023, the EPA continues to require the use of oxygenated gasoline in certain areas during winter to regulate carbon monoxide emissions; however, the programs to fulfill its conditions are implemented by the states. In addition to this North American automakers from 2006 onwards promoted a blend of 85% ethanol and 15% gasoline, marketed as E85, and their flex-fuel vehicles, e.g. GM's Live Green, Go Yellow campaign. US Corporate Average Fuel Economy (CAFE) standards give an artificial 54% fuel efficiency bonus to vehicles capable of running on 85% alcohol blends over vehicles not adapted to run on 85% alcohol blends. There is also alcohols' intrinsically cleaner combustion, however due to its lower energy density it is not capable of producing as much energy per gallon as gasoline. Much gasoline sold in the United States is blended with up to 10% of an oxygenating agent. This is known as oxygenated fuel and often (but not entirely correctly, as there are reformulated gasolines without oxygenate) as reformulated gasoline. Methyl tert-butyl ether (MTBE) was the most common fuel additive in the United States, prior to government mandated use of ethanol. Typically, gasoline with added MTBE is called reformulated gasoline, while gasoline with ethanol is called oxygenated gasoline.
