= List of gasoline additives =

Gasoline additives may increase gasoline's octane rating, allowing the use of higher compression ratios for greater efficiency and power, or act as corrosion inhibitors or as lubricants. Other additives include metal deactivators, oxygenates and antioxidants.

Some additives are harmful and are regulated or banned in some countries.

== Additives ==
=== Oxygenates ===
==== Alcohols ====
- Methanol (MeOH)
- Ethanol (EtOH); see also common ethanol fuel mixtures
- Isopropyl alcohol (IPA)
- n-butanol (BuOH)
- Gasoline grade t-butanol (GTBA)

==== Ethers ====
- Methyl tert-butyl ether (MTBE), now outlawed in many states of the U.S. for road use because of water contamination.
- Tertiary amyl methyl ether (TAME)
- Tertiary hexyl methyl ether (THEME)
- Ethyl tertiary butyl ether (ETBE)
- Tertiary amyl ethyl ether (TAEE)
- Diisopropyl ether (DIPE)

=== Antioxidants, stabilizers ===
- Butylated hydroxyanisole (BHA)
- Butylated hydroxytoluene (BHT)
- 2-tert-Butylphenol
- 3-tert-Butylphenol
- 4-tert-Butylphenol
- 2,4-Dimethyl-6-tert-butylphenol
- 2,6-Di-tert-butylphenol (2,6-DTBP)
- 2,4,6-Tri-tert-butylphenol (2,4,6-TTBP)
- tert-Butylhydroquinone (TBHQ)
- p-Phenylenediamine
- N,N'-Di-2-butyl-1,4-phenylenediamine
- Ethylenediamine

=== Detergents ===
Fuel detergents combine a low molecular weight polymer "tail" with a polar "head" group such as the amine group.

- Polybuteneamine (PBA), also known as polybutylene amine.
- Polyisobuteneamine (PIBA), also known as polyisobutylene amine. Some sources inaccurately refer to PIBA as "polyisobutylene" (PIB). While PIBA is derived from PIB, the amine group require for detergent power renders it a different molecule.
- Polyetheramine (PEA), formerly a proprietary component in Techron. Patent has since expired. See also polyether.

=== Antiknock agents ===
Metal-based:

- Tetraethyllead (TEL), now banned almost everywhere for causing brain damage, both in its unburned and burned forms.
- Methylcyclopentadienyl manganese tricarbonyl (MMT); a neurotoxic substance like gasoline itself. Can be fatal if swallowed/inhaled. Can cause manganism. Toxicity is mostly relevant to people who handle the unburned form, especially workers who handle gasoline. The combustion products are relatively harmless, especially in the restricted concentrations found in exhaust.
- Ferrocene, an iron compound

Metal-free:

- Dimethyl methylphosphonate
- Toluene
- Isooctane
- Triptane

=== Lead scavengers (for leaded gasoline) ===
- Tricresyl phosphate (TCP) (also an AW additive and EP additive)
- 1,2-Dibromoethane
- 1,2-Dichloroethane

=== Fuel dyes ===
Most common:

- Solvent Red 24
- Solvent Red 26
- Solvent Yellow 124
- Solvent Blue 35

=== Fuel additives in general ===
- Ether and other flammable hydrocarbons have been used extensively as starting fluid for many difficult-to-start engines, especially diesel engines
- Nitromethane, or "nitro", is a high-performance racing fuel
- Acetone is a vaporization additive, mainly used with methanol racing fuel
- Butyl rubber (as polyisobutylene succinimide, detergent to prevent fouling of diesel fuel injectors)
- Ferrous picrate, used in diesel fuel to increase fuel conversion efficiency and reduce emissions
- Two-stroke oil, for lubrication of small engines reliant on crankcase compression
- Upper cylinder lubricant, extensively advertised but of unproven value

== Racing formulations ==
- Nitromethane can increase the cetane number of diesel fuel, improving its combustion properties
- Nitrous oxide, or simply nitrous, is an oxidizer used in many forms of motorsports such as drag racing and street racing.

== Fictional additives ==
- Sugar, as seen in The Passionate Stranger (1957) and popularly believed to damage the engine.

== Legislation ==
=== United States ===
Fuel additives in the United States are regulated under section 211 of the Clean Air Act (as amended in January 1995). The Environmental Protection Agency (EPA) requires the registration of all fuel additives which are commercially distributed for use in highway motor vehicles in the United States, and may require testing and ban harmful additives. The EPA also regularly reviews the health and net economic benefits of Clean Air Act policies.

The act also requires deposit control additives (DCAs) be added to all petrol. This type of additive is a detergent additive that acts as a cleansing agent in small passages in the carburetor or fuel injectors. This in turn serves to ensure a consistent air and fuel mixture that will contribute to better gas mileage.

== See also ==
- Metering pump
- Oil additive
- Greenwashing
