= Methyl tert-butyl ether =

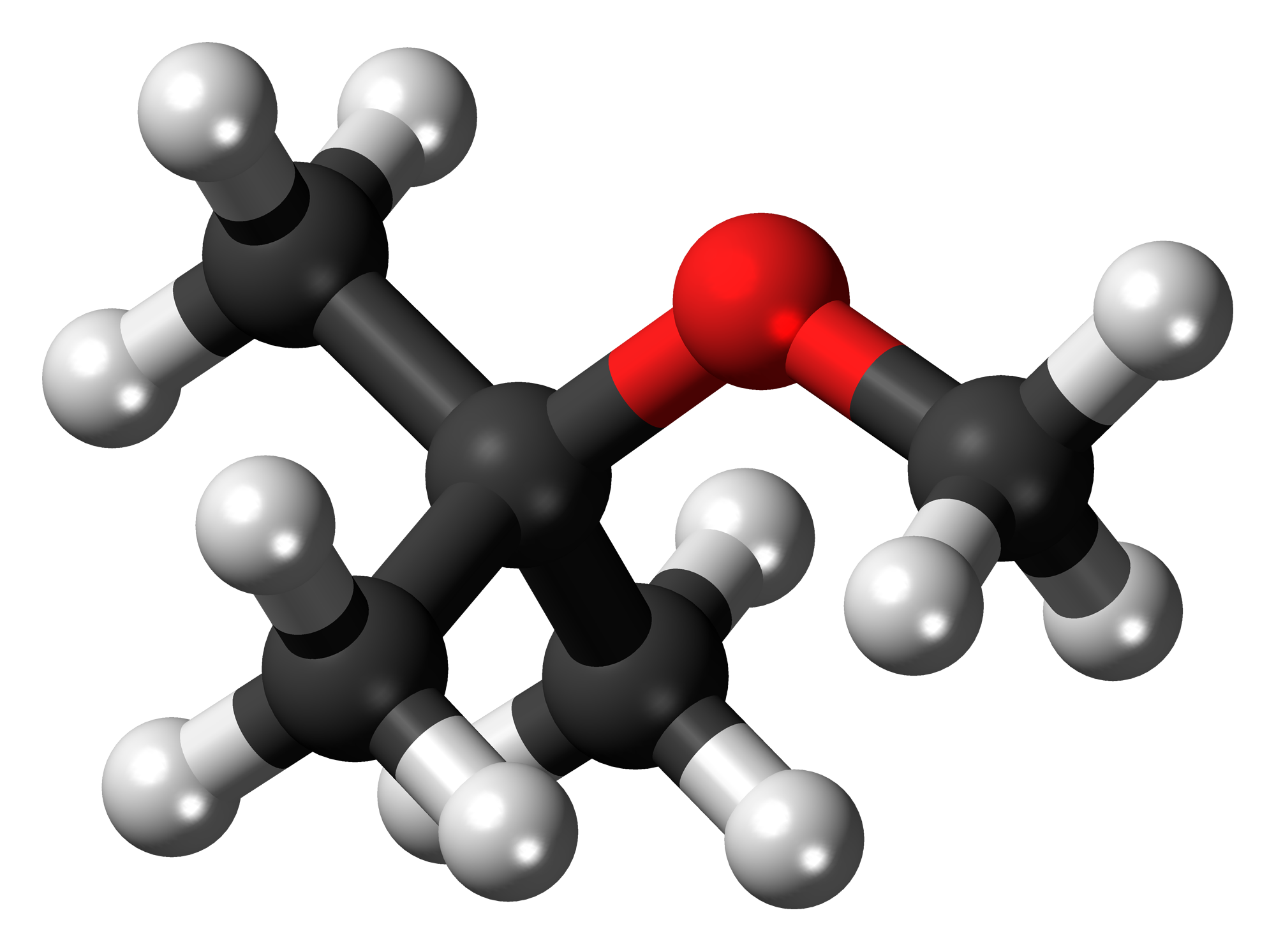

Names
- Preferred IUPAC name 2-Methoxy-2-methylpropane
- Other names: Methyl tertiary-butyl ether; Methyl t-butyl ether; MTBE; tert-Butyl methyl ether; tBME; tert-BuOMe

Identifiers
CAS Number	1634-04-4
3D model (JSmol)	Interactive image
ChEBI	CHEBI:27642
ChemSpider	14672
ECHA InfoCard	100.015.140
KEGG	C11344
PubChem CID	15413
UNII	29I4YB3S89
CompTox Dashboard (EPA)	DTXSID3020833
- InChI: InChI=1S/C5H12O/c1-5(2,3)6-4/h1-4H3 Key: BZLVMXJERCGZMT-UHFFFAOYSA-N; InChI=1/C5H12O/c1-5(2,3)6-4/h1-4H3 Key: BZLVMXJERCGZMT-UHFFFAOYAA
- SMILES: O(C(C)(C)C)C

Properties
Chemical formula	C_{5}H_{12}O
Molar mass	88.150 g·mol^{−1}
Appearance	colourless liquid
Density	0.7404 g/cm^{3}
Melting point	−108.6 °C (−163.5 °F; 164.6 K)
Boiling point	55.5 °C (131.9 °F; 328.6 K)
Solubility in water	26 g/L (20 °C)
Vapor pressure	27kPa (20ºC)
Viscosity	3.4·10^{−4} Pa·s (at 25ºC)

Hazards
NFPA 704 (fire diamond)	2 3 0
Flash point	−32.78 °C (−27.00 °F; 240.37 K)
Autoignition temperature	435 °C (815 °F; 708 K)
- Except where otherwise noted, data are given for materials in their standard state (at 25 °C [77 °F], 100 kPa). verify (what is ?) Infobox references

Methyl tert-butyl ether (MTBE), also known as tert-butyl methyl ether, is an organic compound with a structural formula (CH_{3})_{3}COCH_{3}. MTBE is a volatile, flammable, and colorless liquid that is sparingly soluble in water. Primarily used as a fuel additive, MTBE is blended into gasoline to increase octane rating and knock resistance, and to reduce unwanted tailpipe emissions.

== Production and properties ==
MTBE is manufactured via the chemical reaction of methanol and isobutylene. Methanol is primarily derived from natural gas, where steam reforming converts the various light hydrocarbons in natural gas (primarily methane) into carbon monoxide and hydrogen. The resulting gases then further react in the presence of a catalyst to form methanol. Isobutylene can be produced through a variety of methods. n-butane can be isomerized into isobutane which can be dehydrogenated to isobutylene. In the Halcon process, t-Butyl hydroperoxide derived from isobutane oxygenation is treated with propylene to produce propylene oxide and t-butanol. The t-butanol can be dehydrated to isobutylene.

MTBE production across the globe has been steady because of its positive impact on engine performance. The global demand has been mainly driven by growing Asian markets. Chinese capacity grew from ~18 million metric tons in 2017 to ~22 millions in 2023, with actual production standing at ~16 millions in the same year.

=== US perspective ===
Production of MTBE in the U.S. peaked in 1999 at 260,000 barrels per day before dropping down due to environmental and health concerns as well as pressure from the bioethanol lobby, to about 50,000 barrels per day and holding steady, mostly for the export market. After the purchase of SABIC, oil giant Saudi Aramco is now considered to be the world's largest producer with an estimated production capacity of 2.37 million metric tons per year (mt/yr). Worldwide production capacity of MTBE in 2018 was estimated to be 35 million metric tons.

== Uses ==
MTBE is used as a fuel component in fuel for gasoline engines. It is one of a group of chemicals commonly known as oxygenates because they raise the oxygen content of gasoline.

=== As anti-knocking agent ===
In the U.S. MTBE has been used in gasoline at low levels since 1979, replacing tetraethyllead (TEL) as an antiknock (octane rating) additive to prevent engine knocking. Oxygenates also help gasoline burn more completely, reducing tailpipe emissions. Oxygenates also dilute or displace gasoline components such as aromatics (e.g., benzene). Before the introduction of other oxygenates and octane enhancers, refiners chose MTBE for its blending characteristics and low cost.

==== Alternatives to MTBE as an anti-knock agent ====
Other oxygenates are available as additives for gasoline including ethanol and other ethers such as ETBE.

Ethanol has been advertised as a safe alternative by agricultural and other interest groups in the U.S. and Europe. In 2003, California was the first U.S. state to start replacing MTBE with ethanol.

An alternative to ethanol is ETBE, which is manufactured from ethanol and isobutene. Its performance as an additive is similar to MTBE, but due to the higher price of ethanol compared to methanol, it is more expensive.

Higher quality gasoline is also an alternative, so that additives such as MTBE are unnecessary. Iso-octane itself is used. MTBE plants can be retrofitted to produce iso-octane from isobutylene.

=== As a solvent ===
MTBE is sometimes used as a solvent, although it is used less commonly than diethyl ether. Although an ether, MTBE is a poor Lewis base (due to steric effects) and does not support formation of Grignard reagents. It reacts dangerously with strong acids or bromine.

MTBE forms azeotropes with water (52.6 °C; 96.5% MTBE) and methanol (51.3 °C; 68.6% MTBE). The solubility of water in MTBE is reported to be 1.5 g/100g at 23 °C.

In an investigational medical procedure called contact dissolution therapy, MTBE is injected directly into the gallbladder to dissolve cholesterol gallstones. Due to concerns of MTBE toxicity and potentially serious side effects in the event of solvent draining into the duodenum, and the advent of laparoscopic surgery techniques, this procedure is considered obsolete.

MTBE is used in organic chemistry as a relatively inexpensive solvent with properties comparable to diethyl ether, but with a higher boiling point and less solubility in water. As a solvent, MTBE has one distinct advantage over most ethers - it has a much lower tendency to form explosive organic peroxides. It is widely used as a solvent in industry where, for safety and regulatory reasons, handling diethyl ether or other ethers is much more difficult and expensive. MTBE as a solvent is used in the oil refining industry as a method for dewaxing waxy petroleum fractions.

== Persistence and pervasiveness in the environment ==
MTBE gives water an unpleasant taste, even at very low concentrations of <30 μg/L (<30ppb). MTBE often is introduced into water-supply aquifers by leaking underground storage tanks (USTs) at gasoline stations or spills of gasoline. The higher water solubility and persistence of MTBE cause it to travel faster and farther than many other components of gasoline when released into an aquifer.

MTBE is biodegraded by the action of bacteria. In the proper type of bioreactor, such as a fluidized bed bioreactor, MTBE may be removed rapidly and economically from water to undetectable levels. Activated carbon produced from coconut shells and optimized for MTBE adsorption may reduce MTBE to undetectable levels, although this level of reduction is likely to occur only in the most ideal circumstances. There are currently no known published cases of any in-situ treatment method that has been capable of reducing contaminant concentrations to baseline (pre-development) conditions within the aquifer soil matrix.

=== Health and safety ===
According to the International Agency for Research on Cancer (IARC), a branch of the World Health Organization, MTBE is reclassified as group 2B in 2025 (possibly carcinogenic to humans) as animal studies have indicated a possibility to cause cancer at doses far above the taste threshold. Automotive gasoline itself is classified as group 1 (carcinogenic to humans) as there is definitive evidence.

According to exposure data presented in an earlier version of the IARC monograph, the highest human exposure to MTBE occurs in workers responsible for transporting the chemical and blending it into gasoline. Concentrations found in ambient air and environmental are orders of magnitude lower than occupational exposure, even for customers refilling at service stations. Animal studies failed to cause an increase in cancer rates when MTBE is laced into food, but inhalation was able to increase the incidence of cancer in rats. This version classified MTBE as group 3 (not classifiable as carcinogenic to humans) as the animal data is too weak.

== Regulation and litigation in the U.S. ==
=== Restrictions on MTBE manufacturing and use ===
The Energy Policy Act of 2005, as approved by the U.S. House of Representatives, did not include a provision for shielding MTBE manufacturers from water contamination lawsuits. This provision was first proposed in 2003 and had been thought by some to be a priority of Tom DeLay and Rep. Joe Barton, then chairman of the Energy and Commerce Committee. This bill did include a provision that gave MTBE makers, including some major oil companies, $2 billion in transition assistance while MTBE was phased out over the following nine years. Due to opposition in the Senate, the conference report dropped all MTBE provisions. The final bill was signed into law by President George W. Bush. The lack of MTBE liability protection is resulting in a switchover to the use of ethanol as a gasoline additive.

=== Cleanup costs and litigation ===
MTBE removal from groundwater and soil contamination in the U.S. was estimated to cost from $1 billion to US$30 billion, including removing the compound from aquifers and municipal water supplies and replacing leaky underground oil tanks. In one case, the cost to oil companies to clean up the MTBE in wells belonging to the city of Santa Monica, California was estimated to exceed $200 million. In another case, New York City estimated a $250 million cost for cleanup of a single wellfield in the borough of Queens in 2009. In 2013 a jury awarded the State of New Hampshire $236 million in damages in order to treat groundwater contaminated by MTBE.

Many lawsuits are still pending regarding MTBE contamination of public and private drinking water supplies.

=== Drinking water regulations ===
EPA first listed MTBE in 1998 as a candidate for development of a national Maximum Contaminant Level (MCL) standard in drinking water. The agency listed MTBE on its Contaminant Candidate List in 2022 but has not announced whether it will develop an MCL. EPA uses toxicity data in developing MCLs for public water systems.

California established a state-level MCL for MTBE, 13 micrograms per liter, in 2000.

== See also ==
- Cyclopentyl methyl ether (CPME)
- Di-tert-butyl ether
- List of gasoline additives
- tert-Amyl methyl ether (TAME)
