= Tert-Amyl ethyl ether =

tert-Amyl ethyl ether

Names
- Preferred IUPAC name 2-Ethoxy-2-methylbutane
- Other names Ethyl tert-amyl ether

Identifiers
CAS Number	919-94-8
3D model (JSmol)	Interactive image
ChemSpider	12939
ECHA InfoCard	100.122.084
EC Number	618-804-0
PubChem CID	13527
UNII	529VD83WPK
CompTox Dashboard (EPA)	DTXSID7061279
- InChI: InChI=1S/C7H16O/c1-5-7(3,4)8-6-2/h5-6H2,1-4H3 Key: KFRVYYGHSPLXSZ-UHFFFAOYSA-N
- SMILES: CCC(C)(C)OCC

Properties
Chemical formula	C_{7}H_{16}O
Molar mass	116.204 g·mol^{−1}
Density	0.764-0.768 g/mL
Boiling point	102 °C (216 °F; 375 K)
- Except where otherwise noted, data are given for materials in their standard state (at 25 °C [77 °F], 100 kPa). Infobox references

tert-Amyl ethyl ether (TAEE) is a chemical compound, classified as an ether, with the molecular formula C_{7}H_{16}O. It is used as an additive in gasoline fuels as an oxygenate and also as a solvent in organic chemistry.

TAEE is prepared by acid-catalyzed addition of ethanol to 2-methyl-2-butene.

== See also ==
- List of gasoline additives
