= Ethyl tert-butyl ether =

Oxygenate gasoline additive in the production of gasoline from crude oil

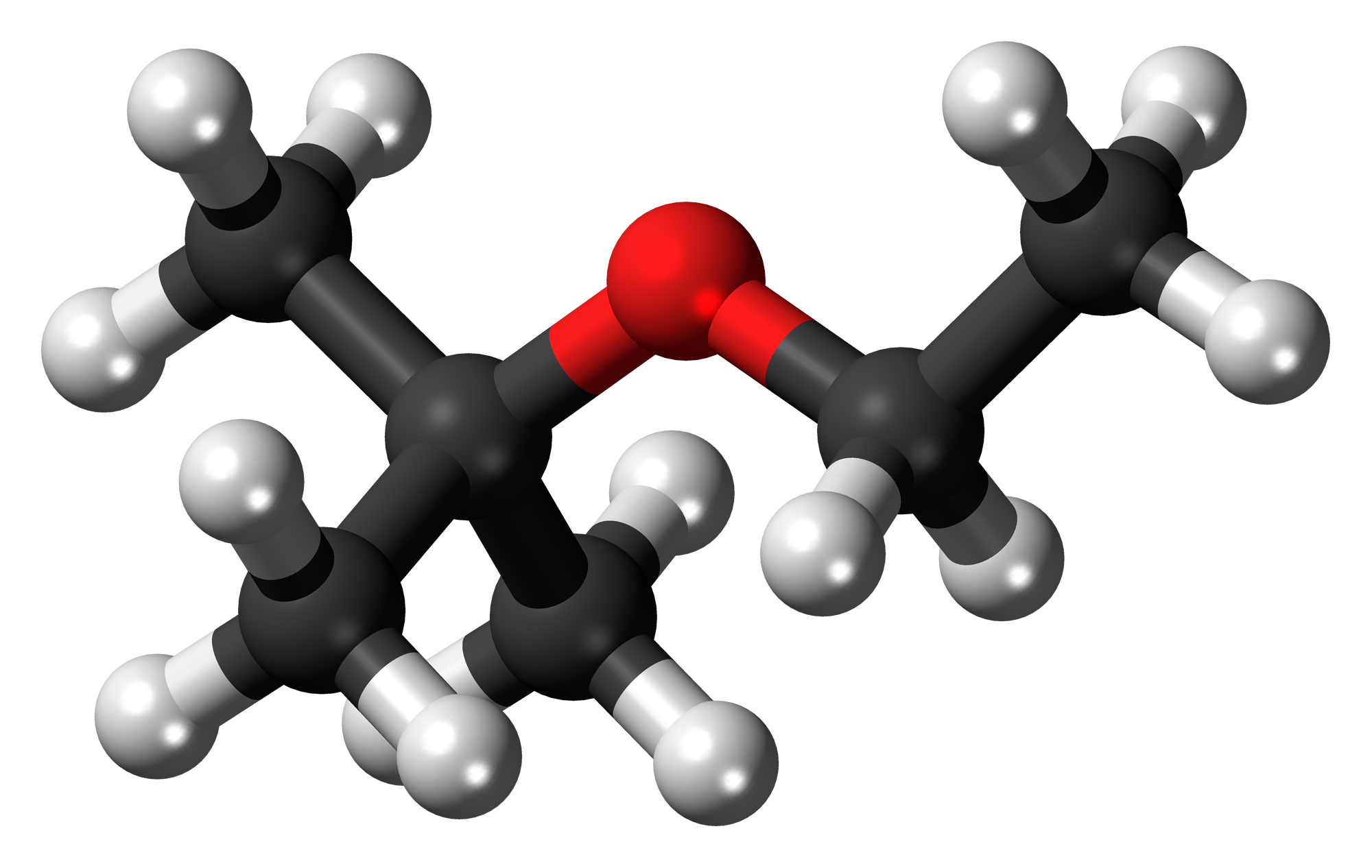
- Ball-and-stick model

Names
- Preferred IUPAC name 2-Ethoxy-2-methylpropane
- Other names Ethyl tert-butyl ether Ethyl tertiary butyl ether Ethyl tert-butyl oxide tert-Butyl ethyl ether Ethyl t-butyl ether

Identifiers
| CAS Number | 637-92-3 |
| 3D model (JSmol) | Interactive image |
| Abbreviations | ETBE |
| ChEBI | CHEBI:141564 |
| ChemSpider | 11996 |
| ECHA InfoCard | 100.010.282 |
| EC Number | 211-309-7 |
| PubChem CID | 12512 |
| RTECS number | KN4730200 |
| UNII | 3R9B16WR19 |
| CompTox Dashboard (EPA) | DTXSID601024578 DTXSID0025604, DTXSID601024578 |
- InChI: InChI=1S/C6H14O/c1-5-7-6(2,3)4/h5H2,1-4H3 Key: NUMQCACRALPSHD-UHFFFAOYSA-N; InChI=1/C6H14O/c1-5-7-6(2,3)4/h5H2,1-4H3 Key: NUMQCACRALPSHD-UHFFFAOYAB
- SMILES: O(C(C)(C)C)CC

Properties
| Chemical formula | C_{6}H_{14}O |
| Molar mass | 102.18 |
| Appearance | Clear colorless liquid |
| Density | 0.7364 g/cm^{3} |
| Melting point | −94 °C (−137 °F; 179 K) |
| Boiling point | 69 to 71 °C (156 to 160 °F; 342 to 344 K) |
| Solubility in water | 1.2 g/100 g |

Hazards
- GHS labelling
| Pictograms | (GHS02: Flammable) (GHS07: Exclamation mark) |
| Signal word | Danger |
| Hazard statements | H224, H225, H315, H319, H335, H336 |
| Precautionary statements | P210, P233, P240, P241, P242, P243, P261, P264, P271, P280, P302+P352, P303+P361+P353, P304+P340, P305+P351+P338, P312, P321, P332+P313, P337+P313, P362, P370+P378, P403+P233, P403+P235, P405, P501 |
| Flash point | −19 °C (−2 °F; 254 K) |
- Except where otherwise noted, data are given for materials in their standard state (at 25 °C [77 °F], 100 kPa). verify (what is ?) Infobox references

Ethyl tertiary-butyl ether (ETBE), also known as ethyl tert-butyl ether, is commonly used as an oxygenate gasoline additive in the production of gasoline from crude oil. ETBE offers equal or greater air quality benefits than ethanol, while being technically and logistically less challenging. Unlike ethanol, ETBE does not induce evaporation of gasoline, which is one of the causes of smog, and does not absorb moisture from the atmosphere.

== Production ==
Ethyl tert-butyl ether is manufactured industrially by the acidic etherification of isobutylene with ethanol at a temperature of 30–110 °C and a pressure of 0.8–1.3 MPa. The reaction is carried out with an acidic ion-exchange resin as a catalyst.

Synthesis of Ethyl tert-butyl ether

Suitable reactors are fixed-bed reactors such as tube bundle or circulation reactors in which the reflux can be cooled optionally.

Ethanol, produced by fermentation and distillation, is more expensive than methanol, which is derived from natural gas. Therefore, MTBE, made from methanol, is cheaper than ETBE, made from ethanol.

== See also ==
- Methyl tert-butyl ether (MTBE)
- tert-Amyl methyl ether (TAME)
- Tetraethyllead (TEL)
- List of gasoline additives
