= Diethyl ether =

Organic chemical compound

- Skeletal formula

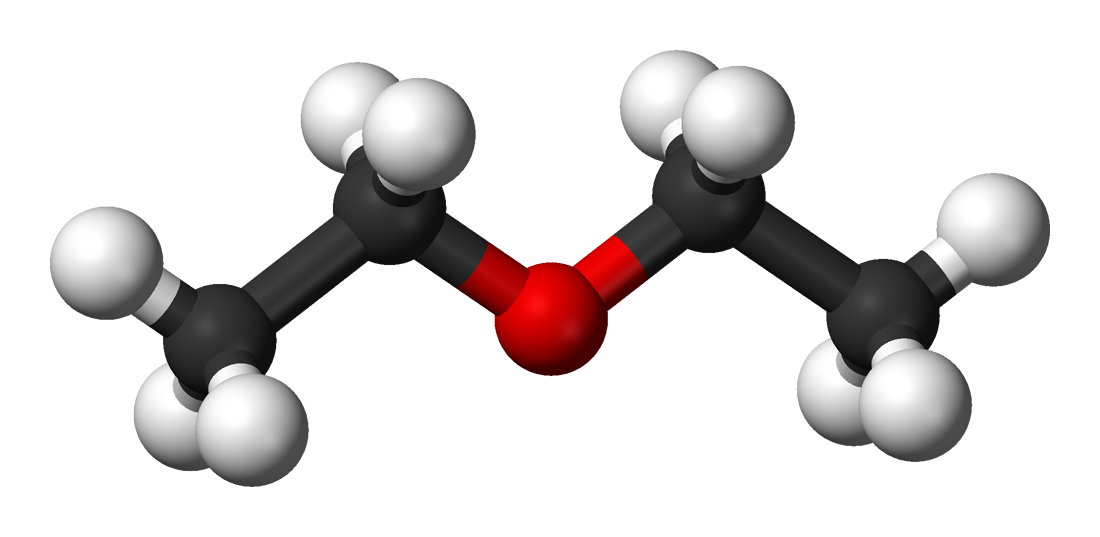
- Ball-and-stick model

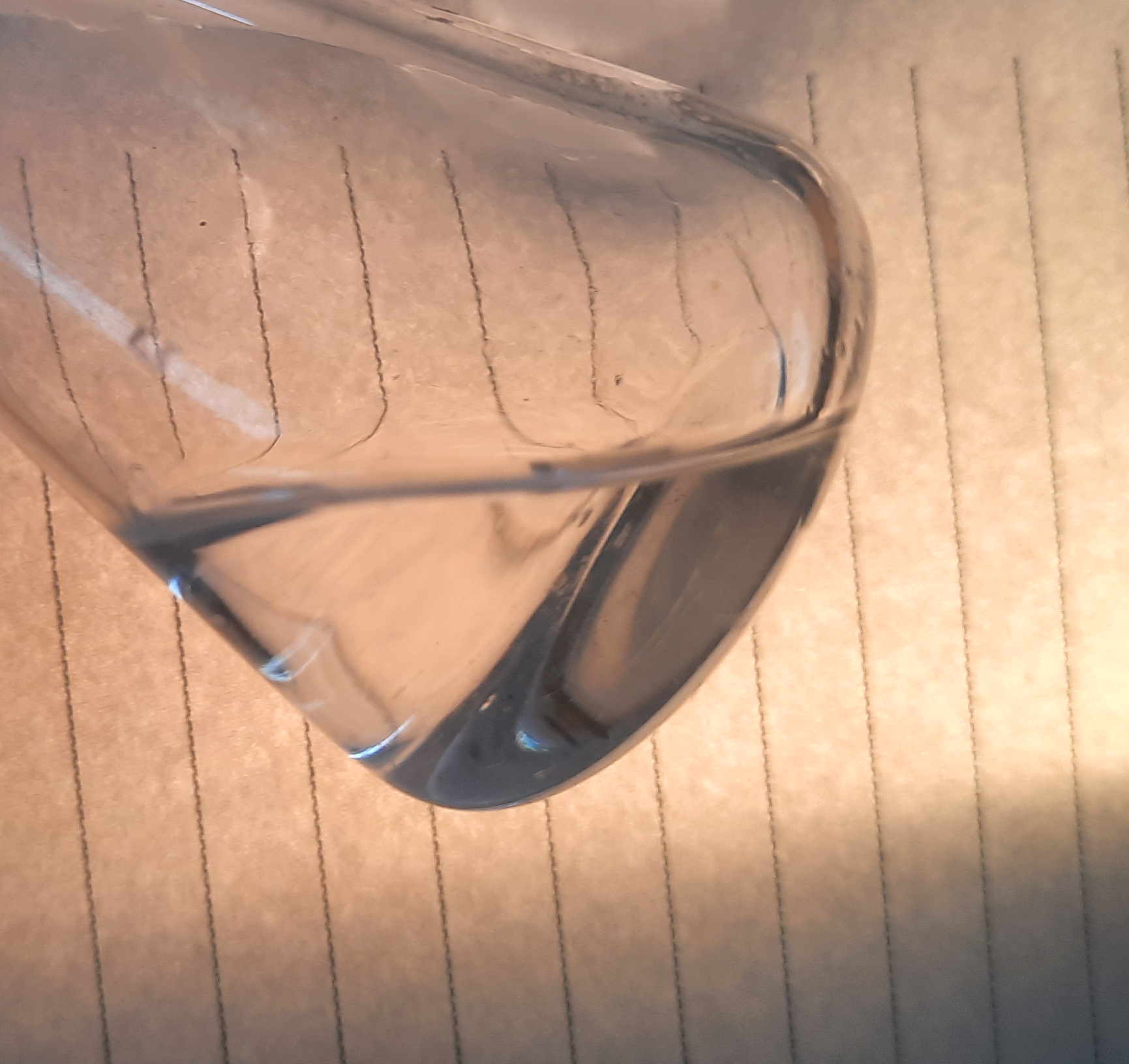
- Sample of diethyl ether

Names
- Preferred IUPAC name Ethoxyethane
- Other names: 3-Oxapentane; Dether; Diethyl ether; Diethyl oxide; Ether; Ethyl ether; Ethyl oxide; Solvent ether; Sulfuric ether; Sulphuric ether; Sweet oil of vitriol; Vitriolic ether

Identifiers
CAS Number	60-29-7
3D model (JSmol)	Interactive image
Abbreviations	Et_{2}O
Beilstein Reference	1696894
ChEBI	CHEBI:35702
ChEMBL	ChEMBL16264
ChemSpider	3168
ECHA InfoCard	100.000.425
EC Number	200-467-2
Gmelin Reference	25444
KEGG	D01772
PubChem CID	3283
RTECS number	KI5775000
UNII	0F5N573A2Y
UN number	1155
CompTox Dashboard (EPA)	DTXSID3021720
- InChI: InChI=1S/C4H10O/c1-3-5-4-2/h3-4H2,1-2H3 Key: RTZKZFJDLAIYFH-UHFFFAOYSA-N; InChI=1/C4H10O/c1-3-5-4-2/h3-4H2,1-2H3 Key: RTZKZFJDLAIYFH-UHFFFAOYAB
- SMILES: CCOCC

Properties
Chemical formula	C_{4}H_{10}O
Molar mass	74.123 g·mol^{−1}
Appearance	Colorless liquid
Odor	Dry, rum-like, sweetish odor
Density	0.7134 g/cm^{3}, liquid
Melting point	−116.3 °C (−177.3 °F; 156.8 K)
Boiling point	34.6 °C (94.3 °F; 307.8 K)
Solubility in water	6.05 g/(100 mL)
log P	0.98
Vapor pressure	440 mmHg (58.66 kPa) at 20 °C
Magnetic susceptibility (χ)	−55.1·10^{−6} cm^{3}/mol
Refractive index (n_{D})	1.353 (20 °C)
Viscosity	0.224 cP (25 °C)

Structure
Dipole moment	1.15 D (gas)

Thermochemistry
Heat capacity (C)	172.5 J/(mol·K)
Std molar entropy (S^{⦵}_{298})	253.5 J/(mol·K)
Std enthalpy of formation (Δ_{f}H^{⦵}_{298})	−271.2 ± 1.9 kJ/mol
Std enthalpy of combustion (Δ_{c}H^{⦵}_{298})	−2732.1 ± 1.9 kJ/mol

Pharmacology
ATC code	N01AA01 (WHO)

Hazards
- Occupational safety and health (OHS/OSH)
Main hazards	Extremely flammable, harmful to skin, decomposes to explosive peroxides in air and light, may cause dizziness in a less ventilated place or if ingested.
- GHS labelling
Pictograms	(GHS02: Flammable) (GHS07: Exclamation mark)
Signal word	Danger
Hazard statements	H224, H302, H336
Precautionary statements	P210, P233, P240, P241, P242, P243, P261, P264, P270, P271, P280, P301+P312, P303+P361+P353, P304+P340, P312, P330, P370+P378, P403+P233, P403+P235, P405, P501
NFPA 704 (fire diamond)	2 4 1
Flash point	−45 °C (−49 °F; 228 K)
Autoignition temperature	160 °C (320 °F; 433 K)
Explosive limits	1.85–48.0%
- Lethal dose or concentration (LD, LC)
LC_{50} (median concentration)	73,000 ppm (rat, 2 hr); 6500 ppm (mouse, 1.65 hr)
LC_{Lo} (lowest published)	106,000 ppm (rabbit); 76,000 ppm (dog)
- NIOSH (US health exposure limits)
PEL (Permissible)	TWA 400 ppm (1200 mg/m^{3})
REL (Recommended)	No established REL
IDLH (Immediate danger)	1900 ppm
Safety data sheet (SDS)	External MSDS

Related compounds
Related ethers	Dimethyl ether; Ethyl methyl ether; Methyl propyl ether; Dipropyl ether; Diisopropyl ether; Dibutyl ether; Divinyl ether; Diphenyl ether; 1,4-Dioxane; Furan
Related compounds	Diethyl sulfide; Diethyl selenide; Ethanol; Butanols (isomer); 2-Ethoxyethanol; Diethylene glycol; Polyethylene glycol; Diethyl ether hydroperoxide; Diethylamine; Triethylamine

Supplementary data page
- Diethyl ether (data page)
- Except where otherwise noted, data are given for materials in their standard state (at 25 °C [77 °F], 100 kPa). verify (what is ?) Infobox references

Diethyl ether, or simply ether (abbreviated as eth. or Et_{2}O) (Note: "Et" stands for monovalent ethyl group CH_{3}CH_{2} (see pseudoelement symbol)) is an organic compound with the chemical formula (CH_{3}CH_{2})_{2}O, belonging to the ether class. It is a colourless, highly volatile, sweet-smelling (termed "ethereal odour"), and extremely flammable liquid. It is a common solvent and was formerly used as a general anesthetic.

== History ==
The compound may have been synthesised by either Jābir ibn Hayyān in the 8th century or Ramon Llull in 1275. It was synthesised in 1540 by Valerius Cordus, who called it "sweet oil of vitriol" (oleum dulce vitrioli) – the name reflects the fact that it is obtained by distilling a mixture of ethanol and sulfuric acid (then known as oil of vitriol) – and noted some of its medicinal properties. At about the same time, Paracelsus discovered the analgesic properties of the molecule in dogs. The name ether was given to the substance in 1729 by August Sigmund Frobenius.

It was considered to be a sulfur compound until the idea was disproved in about 1800.

The synthesis of diethyl ether by a reaction between ethanol and sulfuric acid has been known since the 13th century.

=== Anesthesia ===
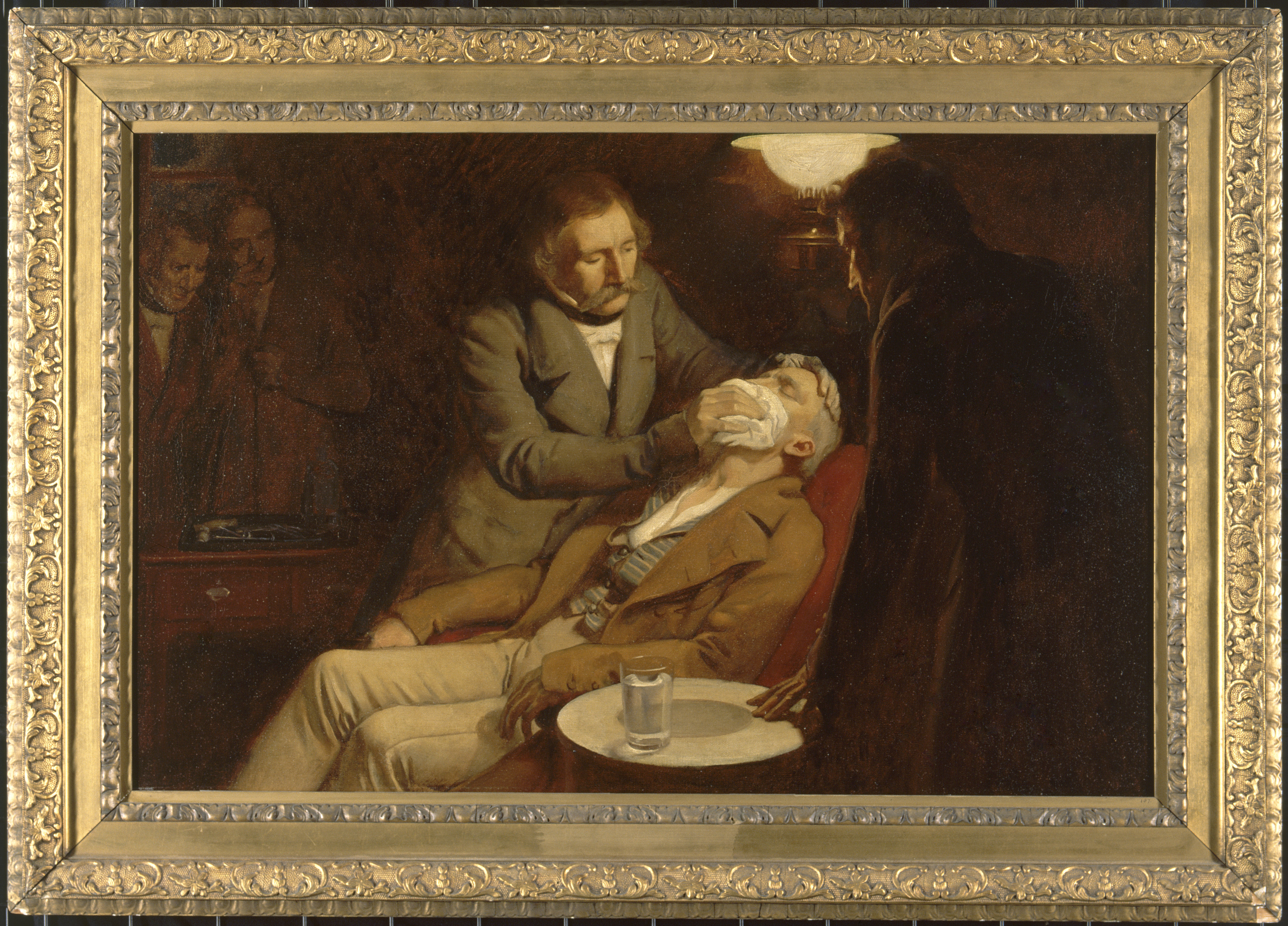
The first use of ether in dental surgery, by Ernest Board.

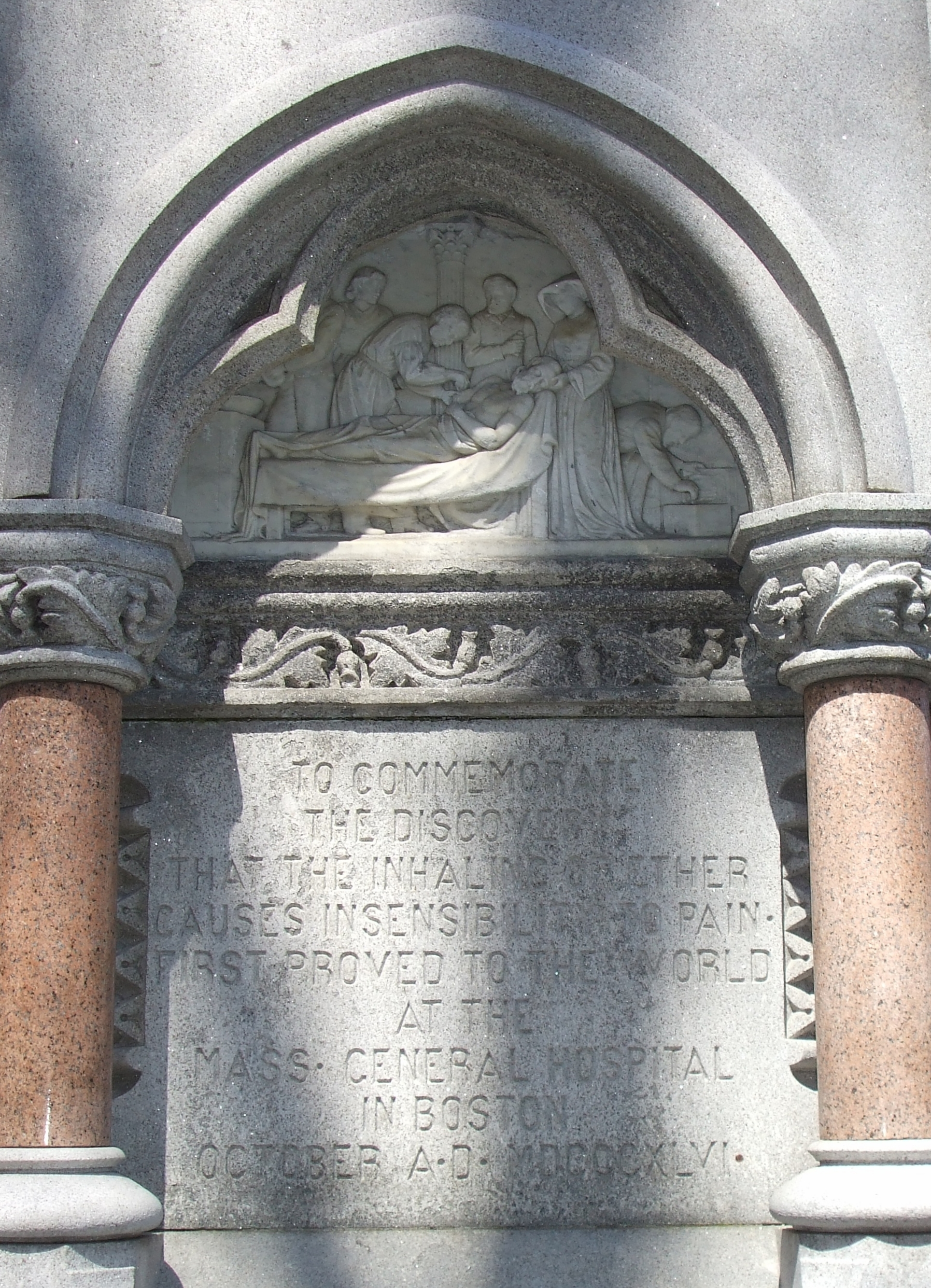
Panel from Ether Monument in Boston commemorating Morton's demonstration of ether's anesthetic use.

William T. G. Morton participated in a public demonstration of ether anesthesia on October 16, 1846, at the Ether Dome in Boston, Massachusetts. Morton had called his ether preparation, with aromatic oils to conceal its smell, "Letheon" after the Lethe River (Λήθη, meaning "forgetfulness, oblivion"). However, Crawford Williamson Long is now known to have demonstrated its use privately as a general anesthetic in surgery to officials in Georgia, as early as March 30, 1842, and Long publicly demonstrated ether's use as a surgical anesthetic on six occasions before the Boston demonstration. British doctors were aware of the anesthetic properties of ether as early as 1840 where it was widely prescribed in conjunction with opium. Diethyl ether was initially controversial among physicians, in part because Morton patented his discovery, which went against medical ethics at the time. Diethyl ether was preferred by some practitioners over chloroform as a general anesthetic due to ether's more favorable therapeutic index, that is, a greater difference between an effective dose and a potentially toxic dose.

Diethyl ether does not depress the myocardium but rather it stimulates the sympathetic nervous system leading to hypertension and tachycardia. It is safely used in patients with shock as it preserves the baroreceptor reflex. Its minimal effect on myocardial depression and respiratory drive, as well as its low cost and high therapeutic index allows it to see continued use in developing countries. Diethyl ether could also be mixed with other anesthetic agents such as chloroform to make C.E. mixture, or chloroform and alcohol to make A.C.E. mixture. In the mid-20th century the growing use of electrical cauterization in surgery necessitated a switch to non-flammable anesthesia. In the 21st century, ether is rarely used. The use of flammable ether was displaced by nonflammable fluorinated hydrocarbon anesthetics. Halothane was the first such anesthetic developed and other currently used inhaled anesthetics, such as isoflurane, desflurane, and sevoflurane, are halogenated ethers. Diethyl ether was found to have undesirable side effects, such as post-anesthetic nausea and vomiting. Modern anesthetic agents reduce these side effects.

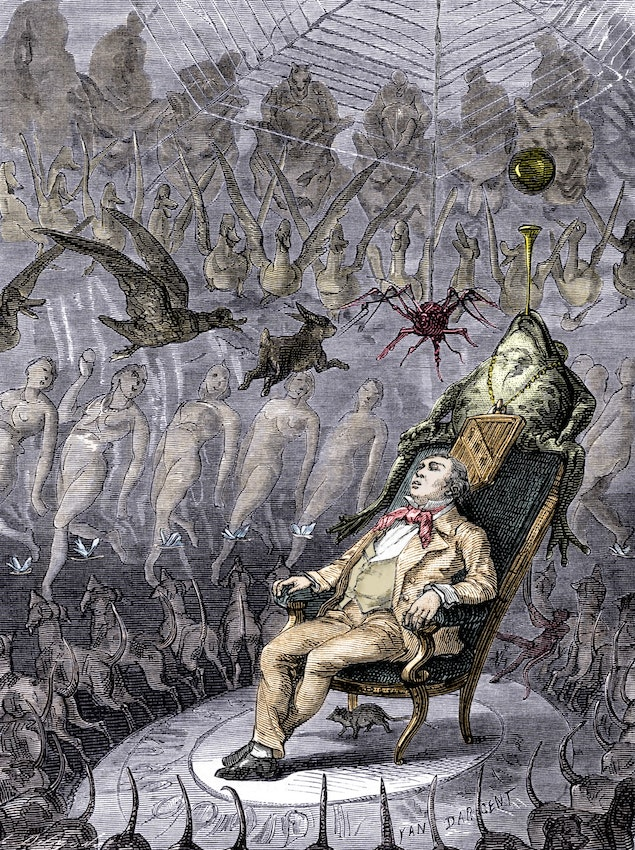
An illustration depicting ether's effects, 1840s–1870s

Prior to 2005, it was on the World Health Organization's List of Essential Medicines for use as an anesthetic.

=== Medicine ===
Ether was once used in pharmaceutical formulations. A mixture of alcohol and ether, one part of diethyl ether and three parts of ethanol, was known as "spirit of ether", Hoffman's Anodyne or Hoffman's Drops. In the United States this concoction was removed from the Pharmacopeia at some point prior to June 1917, as a study published by William Procter, Jr. in the American Journal of Pharmacy as early as 1852 showed that there were differences in formulation to be found between commercial manufacturers, between international pharmacopoeia, and from Hoffman's original recipe. It was also used to treat hiccups through instillation into the nasal cavity.

=== Recreational use ===
The recreational use of ether also took place at organised parties in the 19th century called ether frolics, where guests were encouraged to inhale therapeutic amounts of diethyl ether or nitrous oxide, producing a state of excitation. Long, as well as fellow dentists Horace Wells, William Edward Clarke, and William T. G. Morton, observed that during these gatherings, people would often experience minor injuries but appear to show no reaction to them, nor memory that it had happened, demonstrating ether's anaesthetic effects.

In the 19th and early 20th centuries, ether drinking was popular among Polish peasants. It is a traditional and still relatively popular recreational drug among Lemkos. It is usually consumed in a small quantity (kropka, or "dot") poured over milk, sugar water, or orange juice in a shot glass. As a drug, it has been known to cause psychological dependence, sometimes referred to as etheromania.

Ether intoxication is referenced in Hunter S. Thompson's Fear and Loathing in Las Vegas, where in one of the book's most famous quotes, protagonist Raoul Duke declares that "There is nothing in the world more helpless and irresponsible and depraved than a man in the depths of an ether binge."

== Production ==
Most diethyl ether is produced as a byproduct of the vapor-phase hydration of ethylene to make ethanol. This process uses solid-supported phosphoric acid catalysts and can be adjusted to make more ether if the need arises: Vapor-phase dehydration of ethanol over some alumina catalysts can give diethyl ether yields of up to 95%.

2 CH_{3}CH_{2}OH → (CH_{3}CH_{2})_{2}O + H_{2}O

Diethyl ether can be prepared both in laboratories and on an industrial scale by the acid ether synthesis.

== Uses ==
The dominant use of diethyl ether is as a solvent. One particular application is in the production of cellulose plastics such as cellulose acetate.

=== Laboratory solvent ===
It is a common solvent for the Grignard reaction in addition to other reactions involving organometallic reagents. These uses exploit its basicity. Diethyl ether is a popular non-polar solvent in liquid-liquid extraction. As an extractant, it is immiscible with and less dense than water.

Although immiscible, it has significant solubility in water (6.05 g/(100 ml) at 25 °C) and dissolves 1.5 g/(100 g) (1.0 g/(100 ml)) water at 25 °C.

=== Fuel ===
Diethyl ether has a high cetane number of 85–96 and, in combination with petroleum distillates for gasoline and diesel engines, is used as a starting fluid because of its high volatility and low flash point. Ether starting fluid is sold and used in countries with cold climates, as it can help with cold starting an engine at sub-zero temperatures. For the same reason it is also used as a component of the fuel mixture for carbureted compression ignition model engines.

== Chemical reactions ==
Triethyloxonium tetrafluoroborate is prepared from boron trifluoride, diethyl ether, and epichlorohydrin:

4 Et_{2}O·BF_{3} + 2 Et_{2}O + 3 C_{2}H_{3}OCH_{2}Cl → 3 [Et_{3}O]^{+}[BF_{4}]^{−} + B(OCH_{2}(CH_{2}Cl)CH_{2}OEt)_{3}

Diethyl ether is a common laboratory aprotic solvent. It is susceptible to the formation of hydroperoxides.

== Metabolism ==
A cytochrome P450 enzyme is proposed to metabolize diethyl ether.

Diethyl ether inhibits alcohol dehydrogenase, and thus slows the metabolism of ethanol. It also inhibits metabolism of other drugs requiring oxidative metabolism. For example, diazepam requires hepatic oxidization whereas its oxidized metabolite oxazepam does not.

== Safety, stability, regulations ==
Diethyl ether is extremely flammable and may form explosive vapour/air mixtures.

Since ether is heavier than air it can collect low to the ground and the vapour may travel considerable distances to ignition sources. Ether will ignite if exposed to an open flame, though due to its high flammability, an open flame is not required for ignition. Other possible ignition sources include – but are not limited to – hot plates, steam pipes, heaters, and electrical arcs created by switches or outlets. Vapour may also be ignited by the static electricity which can build up when ether is being poured from one vessel into another. The autoignition temperature of diethyl ether is 160 °C (320 °F). The diffusion of diethyl ether in air is 9.18 × 10^{−6} m^{2}/s (298 K, 101.325 kPa).

Ether is sensitive to light and air, tending to form explosive peroxides. Ether peroxides have a higher boiling point than ether and are contact explosives when dry. Commercial diethyl ether is typically supplied with trace amounts of the antioxidant butylated hydroxytoluene (BHT), which reduces the formation of peroxides. Storage over sodium hydroxide precipitates the intermediate ether hydroperoxides. Water and peroxides can be removed by either distillation from sodium and benzophenone, or by passing through a column of activated alumina.

Due to its application in the manufacturing of illicit substances, it is listed in the Table II precursor under the United Nations Convention Against Illicit Traffic in Narcotic Drugs and Psychotropic Substances as well as substances such as acetone, toluene and sulfuric acid.

== See also ==
- The Great Moment – film about William T.G. Morton and ether
- Flurothyl – fluorinated derivative
