= Instil =

To instil or instill is to slowly but firmly establish something, and may refer to:

- Instillation abortion, a method of induced abortion
- Drug instillation, a method of giving a medication
- Intratracheal instillation
- USS Instill (AM-252), an American minesweeper
