= Model engine (disambiguation) =

Articles on Model engine include:

- Jetex engine, a model rocket motor
- Live steam, for model steam locomotives
- Model engine, for model internal combustion engines
  - Carbureted compression ignition model engine
  - Glow plug (model engine)
- Model steam engine, for models of stationary steam engines
