= Di-tert-butyl ether =

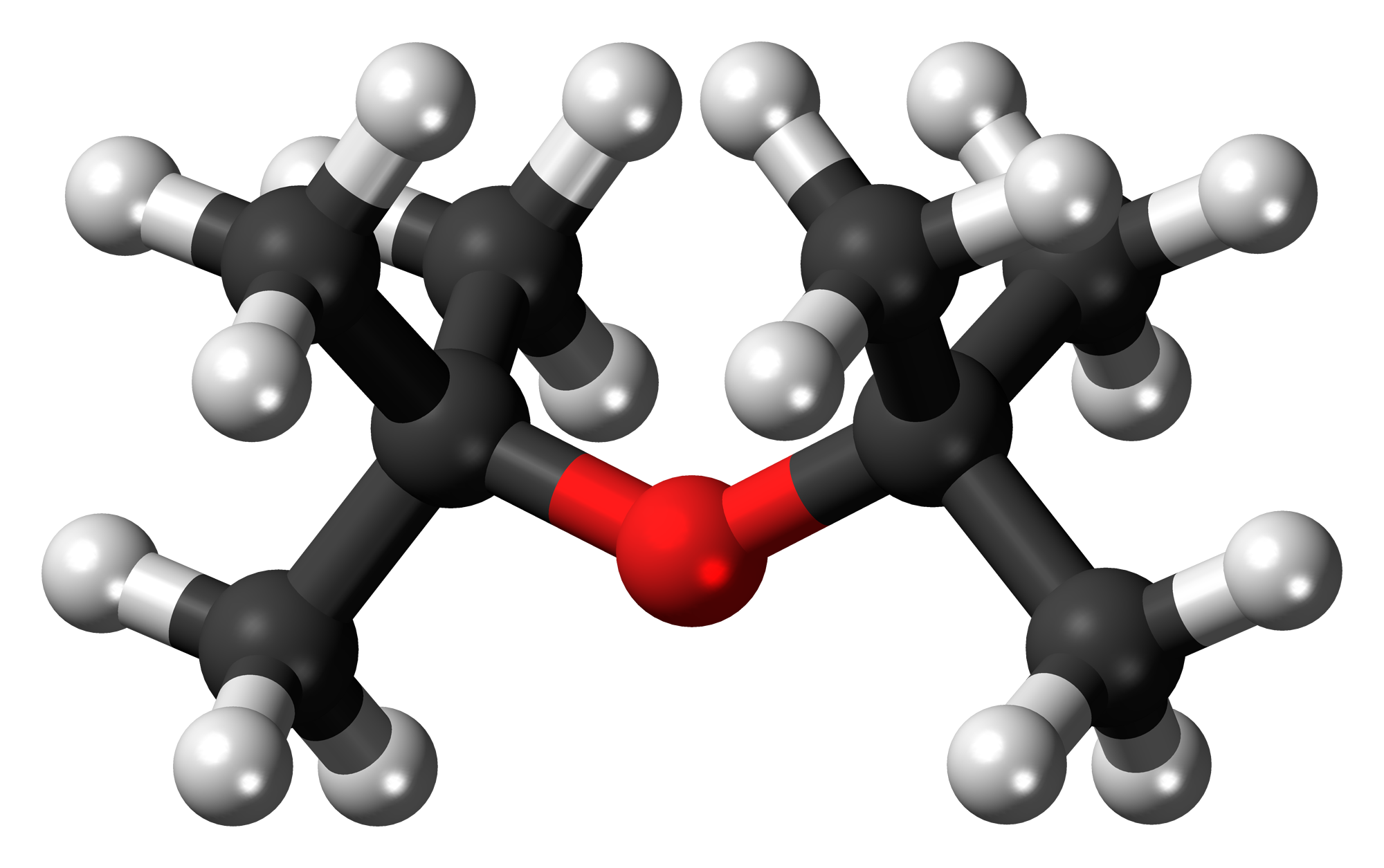

Names
- Preferred IUPAC name 2-Methyl-2-[(2-methylpropan-2-yl)oxy]propane
- Other names 2-tert-Butoxy-2-methylpropane; Di-tert-butyl ether

Identifiers
CAS Number	6163-66-2
3D model (JSmol)	Interactive image
ChemSpider	21138
ECHA InfoCard	100.197.715
PubChem CID	22541
UNII	C3A9UPP65H
CompTox Dashboard (EPA)	DTXSID80210645
- InChI: InChI=1S/C8H18O/c1-7(2,3)9-8(4,5)6/h1-6H3 Key: AQEFLFZSWDEAIP-UHFFFAOYSA-N; InChI=1/C8H18O/c1-7(2,3)9-8(4,5)6/h1-6H3 Key: AQEFLFZSWDEAIP-UHFFFAOYAT
- SMILES: O(C(C)(C)C)C(C)(C)C

Properties
Chemical formula	C_{8}H_{18}O
Molar mass	130.231 g·mol^{−1}
Appearance	colorless liquid
Density	0.7658 g/cm^{3}
Melting point	−61 °C (−78 °F; 212 K)
Boiling point	107.2 °C (225.0 °F; 380.3 K)
Vapor pressure	3730 Pa (at 22 °C)

Thermochemistry
Heat capacity (C)	276.1 J·mol^{−1}·K^{−1}
Std enthalpy of formation (Δ_{f}H^{⦵}_{298})	−399.6 kJ·mol^{−1}

Hazards
Flash point	−3 °C (27 °F; 270 K)
Autoignition temperature	365 °C (689 °F; 638 K)
Explosive limits	>0.4%
- Except where otherwise noted, data are given for materials in their standard state (at 25 °C [77 °F], 100 kPa). verify (what is ?) Infobox references

Di-tert-butyl ether is a tertiary ether, primarily of theoretical interest as the simplest member of the class of di-tertiary ethers. Di-tertiary ethers are notoriously challenging to prepare because conventional S_{N,2} and dehydration methods favor elimination; as late as 1941, the existence of the molecule remained in doubt.

A mediocre-yielding synthesis for di-tert-butyl ether alkylates silver carbonate with tert-butyl chloride.

== See also ==
- Ether
- Methyl tert-butyl ether
- Dimethyl ether
- Diethyl ether
- Diisopropyl ether
