= Diethyl ether (data page) =

Chemical data page

This page provides supplementary chemical data on diethyl ether.

== Material Safety Data Sheet ==
The handling of this chemical may incur notable safety precautions. It is highly recommended that you seek the Material Safety Datasheet (MSDS) for this chemical from a reliable source such as SIRI, and follow its directions. MSDS for diethyl ether is available at Mallinckrodt Baker.

== Structure and properties ==
Structure and properties
Index of refraction, n_{D}	1.3497 at 24.8 °C
Abbe number	?
Dielectric constant, ε_{r}	4.34 ε_{0} at 20 °C; 8.1 ε_{0} at –64 °C; 10.4 ε_{0} at –116 °C
Bond strength	?
Bond length	?
Bond angle	?
Magnetic susceptibility	?
Surface tension	17.0 dyn/cm at 20 °C
Viscosity	0.2950 mP·s at 0 °C; 0.2681 mP·s at 10 °C; 0.2448 mP·s at 20 °C; 0.2230 mP·s at 30 °C

== Thermodynamic properties ==
Phase behavior
Triple point	156.92 K (–116.23 °C), ? Pa
Critical point	467 K (194 °C), 3600 kPa
Std enthalpy change of fusion, Δ_{fus}H^{~~o~~}	7.19 kJ/mol
Std entropy change of fusion, Δ_{fus}S^{~~o~~}	46.6 J/(mol·K)
Std enthalpy change of vaporization, Δ_{vap}H^{~~o~~}	27.530 kJ/mol at 11.85 °C; 27.247 kJ/mol at 22.48 °C
Std entropy change of vaporization, Δ_{vap}S^{~~o~~}	96.60 J/(mol·K) at 12°
Solid properties
Std enthalpy change of formation, Δ_{f}H^{~~o~~}_{solid}	? kJ/mol
Standard molar entropy, S^{~~o~~}_{solid}	? J/(mol K)
Heat capacity, c_{p}	? J/(mol K)
Liquid properties
Std enthalpy change of formation, Δ_{f}H^{~~o~~}_{liquid}	–271.2 kJ/mol
Standard molar entropy, S^{~~o~~}_{liquid}	253.5 J/(mol K)
Enthalpy of combustion, Δ_{c}H^{~~o~~}	–2726.3 kJ/mol
Heat capacity, c_{p}	172.0 J/(mol K)
Gas properties
Std enthalpy change of formation, Δ_{f}H^{~~o~~}_{gas}	–252.7 kJ/mol
Standard molar entropy, S^{~~o~~}_{gas}	342.2 J/(mol K)
Heat capacity, c_{p}	119.46 J/(mol K) at 25 °C
van der Waals' constants	a = 1761 L^{2} kPa/mol^{2} b = 0.1344 liter per mole

== Vapor pressure of liquid ==
P in mm Hg	1	10	40	100	400	760	1520	3800	7600	15200	30400	45600
T in °C	–74.3	–48.1	–27.7	–11.5	17.9	34.6	56.0	90.0	122.0	156.0	—	—

Table data obtained from CRC Handbook of Chemistry and Physics 44th ed.

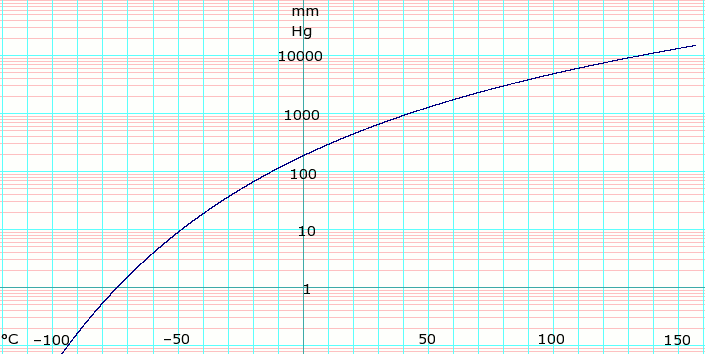
log_{10} of Diethyl Ether vapor pressure. Uses formula: $\scriptstyle \log_e P_{mmHg} =$$\scriptstyle \log_e(\frac {760} {101.325}) - 12.4379 \log_e(T+273.15) - \frac {6340.514} {T+273.15} + 95.14704 + 1.412918 \times 10^{-05}(T+273.15)^2$ obtained from CHERIC

== Distillation data ==
Vapor-liquid Equilibrium for Diethyl Ether/Methanol; P = 700 mmHg
BP Temp. °C	% by mole ether
BP Temp. °C	liquid	vapor
55.98	3.90	25.16
51.78	7.32	38.58
50.00	9.24	43.84
48.95	10.84	47.73
46.20	14.02	54.04
45.70	14.81	55.30
42.25	21.30	63.51
41.65	21.74	64.43
41.15	23.83	65.74
39.90	33.87	72.47
39.45	29.24	69.58
38.40	33.17	71.72
33.40	60.85	83.07
32.90	77.07	86.59
32.48	82.84	88.57
32.02	97.70	97.66
30.50	95.02	94.58

== Spectral data ==
UV-Vis
λ_{max}	? nm
Extinction coefficient, ε	?
IR
Major absorption bands	? cm^{−1}
NMR
Proton NMR	3.479 ppm, 1.208 ppm
Carbon-13 NMR	65.97 ppm, 15.35 ppm
Other NMR data
MS
Masses of main fragments
