= Ether Monument =

Fountain and sculpture in Boston, Massachusetts, U.S.

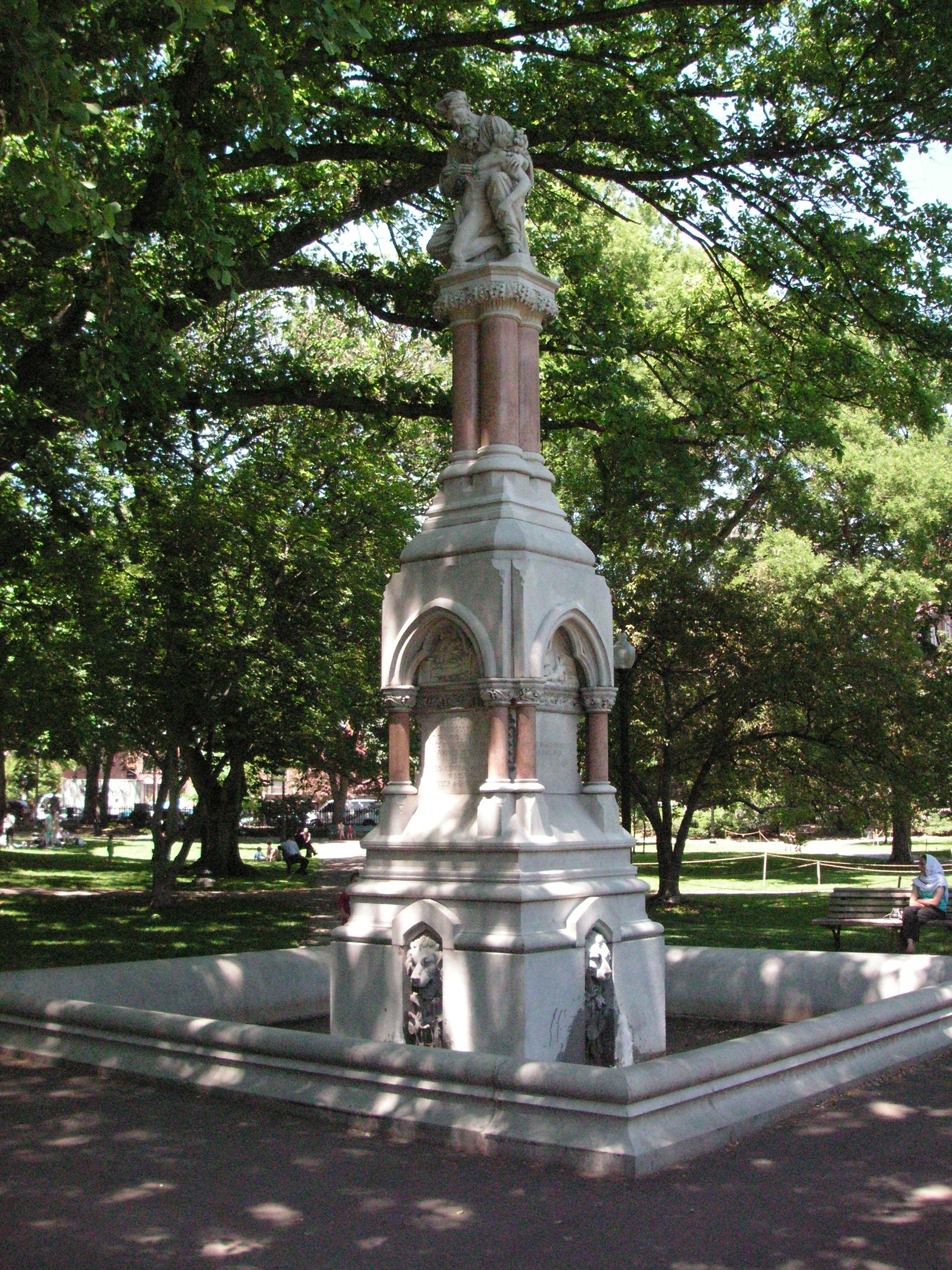
- "Ether Monument" in the Public Garden.
- Interactive map of Ether Monument
- Location: Public Garden, Boston, United States
- Coordinates: 42.3548°N 71.07140°W
- Designer: William Robert Ware and John Quincy Adams Ward
- Type: Monument
- Height: 40 feet
- Completion date: 1868
- Dedicated to: Use of diethyl ether in anesthesia

The Ether Monument, also known as The Good Samaritan, is a statue and fountain near the northwest corner of Boston's Public Garden, near the intersection of Arlington Street and Marlborough Street.

It commemorates the use of ether in anesthesia. Its design has been attributed to the Boston architect William Robert Ware and to the sculptor John Quincy Adams Ward. It is 40 feet (12 m) tall and is the oldest monument in the public garden.

== Description ==
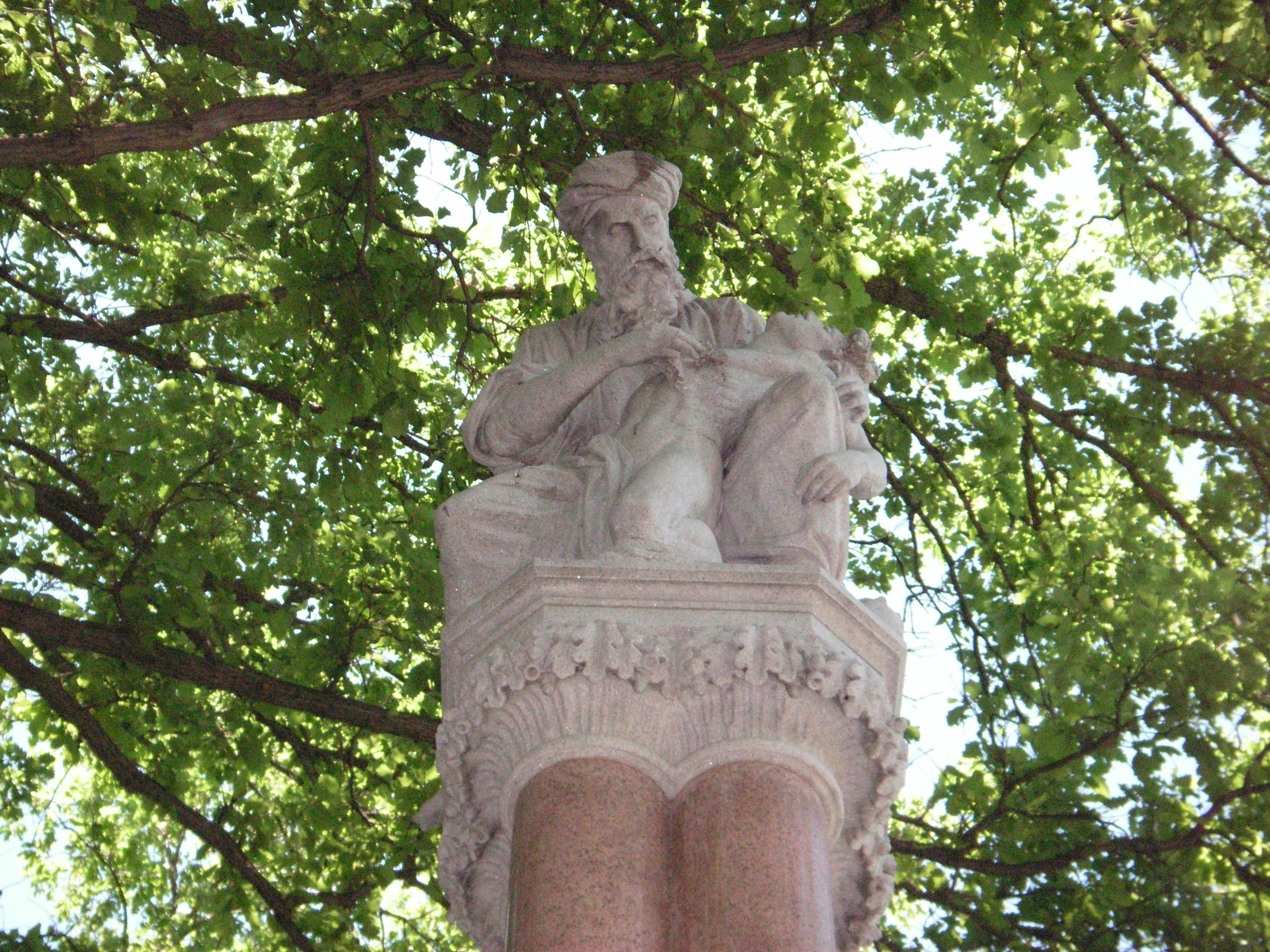
Closeup of the top of the monument.

The statue depicts a medical doctor in medieval Moorish-Spanish robe and turban—representing a Good Samaritan—who holds the drooping body of an almost naked man on his left knee. The doctor holds in his right hand a cloth, suggesting the use of ether that would be developed in centuries to come.

The anachronistic use of a Moorish doctor was probably intentional and served to avoid choosing sides in a debate that was raging at the time over who should receive credit for the first use of ether as an anesthetic. A handful of individuals had claimed credit for the discovery of anesthesia, most notably William T. G. Morton and Crawford Long.

== Inscriptions ==
At the base of the statue are inscriptions explaining the significance of the discovery of the use of ether as an anesthetic. There are four inscriptions, which include biblical quotations from Isaiah 28:29 and Revelation 21:4:

*To commemorate the discovery that the inhaling of ether causes insensibility to pain. First proved to the world at the Mass. General Hospital in Boston, October A.D. MDCCCXLVI

- This also cometh forth from the Lord of Hosts which is wonderful in counsel and excellent in working. Isaiah.
- In gratitude for the relief of human suffering by the inhaling of ether a citizen of Boston has erected this monument A.D. MDCCCLXVII.
- Neither shall there be any more pain. Rev.

== History ==
The idea for the monument began in March 1866, when Boston merchant Thomas Lee offered to fund a fountain-style monument expressing gratitude for the medical breakthrough first demonstrated at Massachusetts General Hospital in 1846. The city accepted his proposal, and the city government formally approved the plan later that month. Designed collaboratively by architect William Robert Ware (often cited with Henry Van Brunt) and sculptor John Quincy Adams Ward, the monument’s form incorporates allegorical sculpture and reliefs illustrating mercy and the relief of suffering. Construction was completed, and the monument was dedicated on June 27, 1868, making it the oldest monument in the Public Garden.

Throughout its history, the Ether Monument has served both as a celebration of medical progress and a focal point for preservation efforts. Though exposed to the elements for over a century, the structure remained an enduring symbol of the advent of anesthesia in the United States. In 2006 the monument underwent a significant restoration and rededication, led by preservation groups and supported by donations from the anesthesiology community and local foundations. This refurbishment ensured the continued conservation of its granite and marble features and reaffirmed its place in Boston’s cultural and scientific heritage.

== Upkeep ==
As an outdoor monument in an area with a harsh climate, the structure has needed regular upkeep and repair. One source of revenue for upkeep of the monument has been income from R. A. Ortega's Written in Granite: An Illustrated History of the Ether Monument, which is available only by making a donation of at least $100 through the Friends of the Public Garden which goes to a fund devoted to preserving the monument for the future.

== Photo Gallery ==
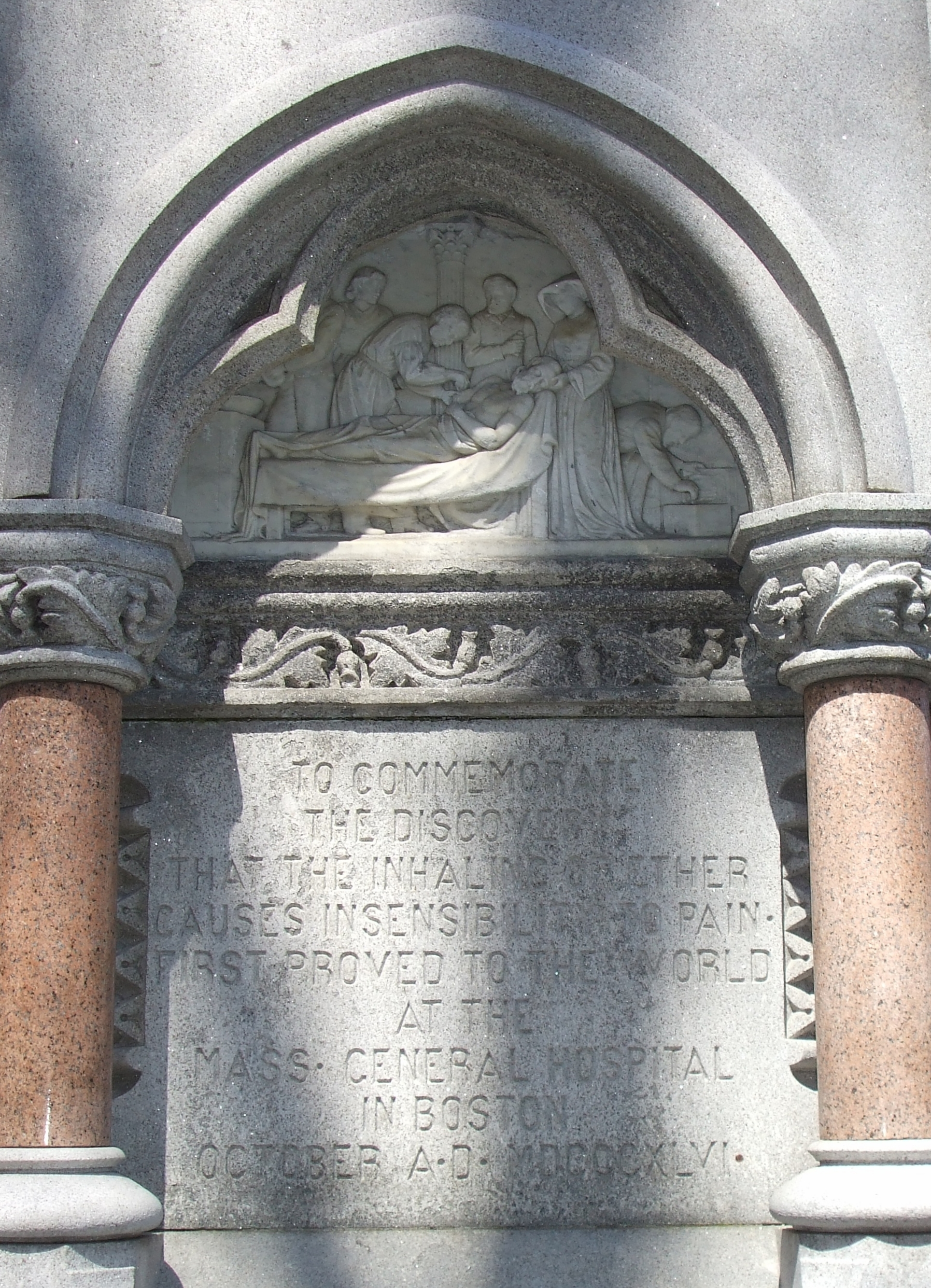

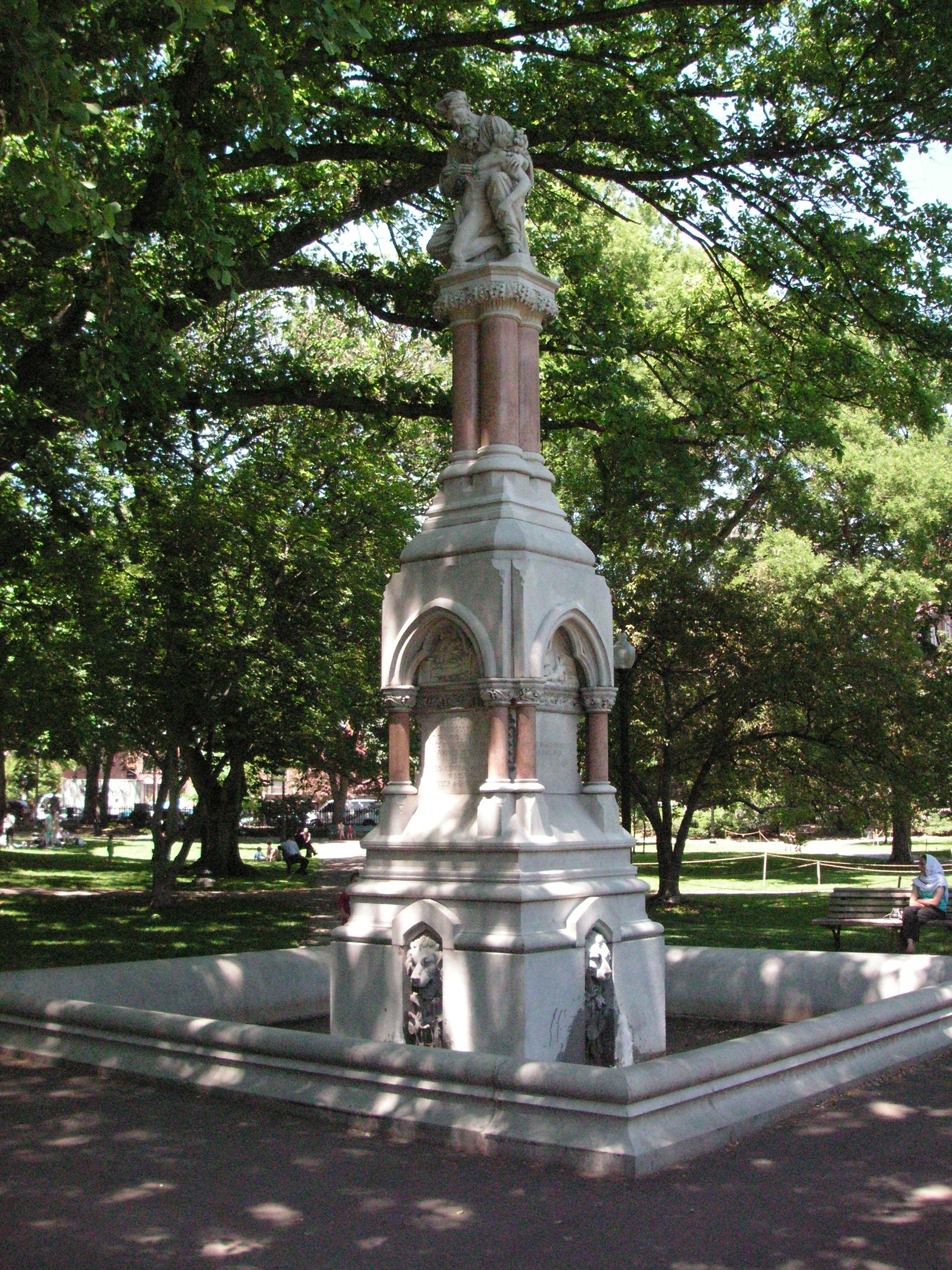

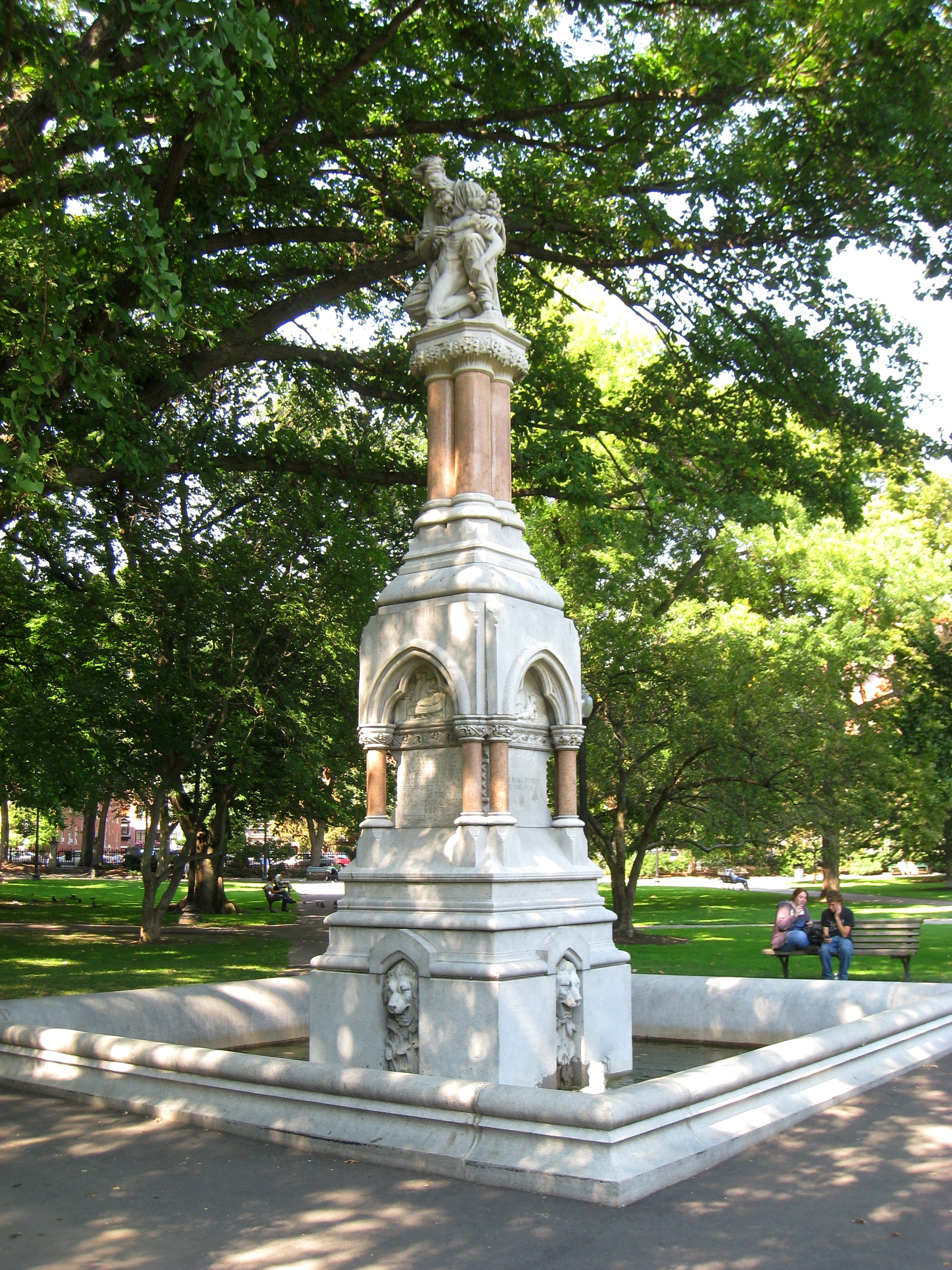

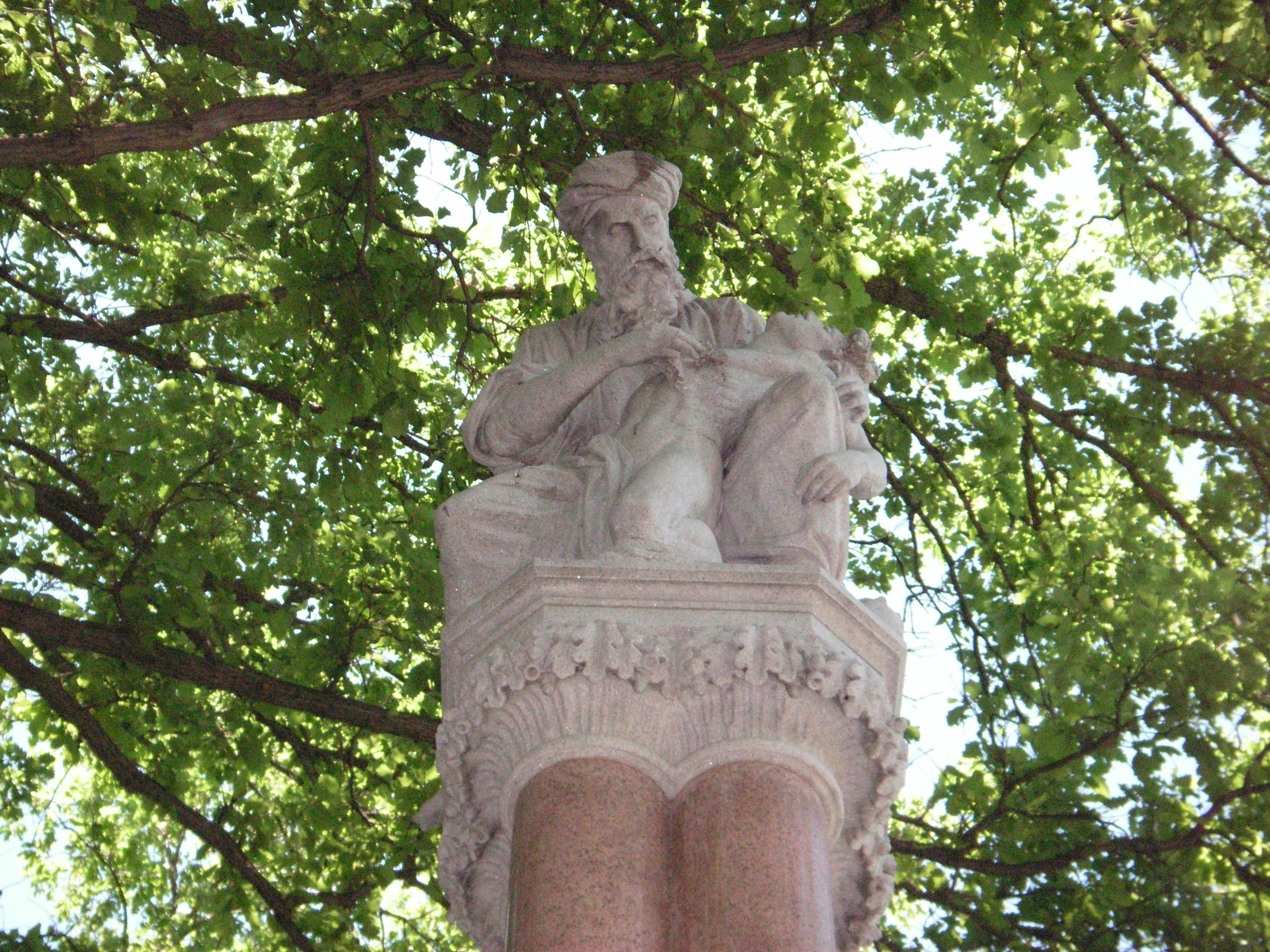

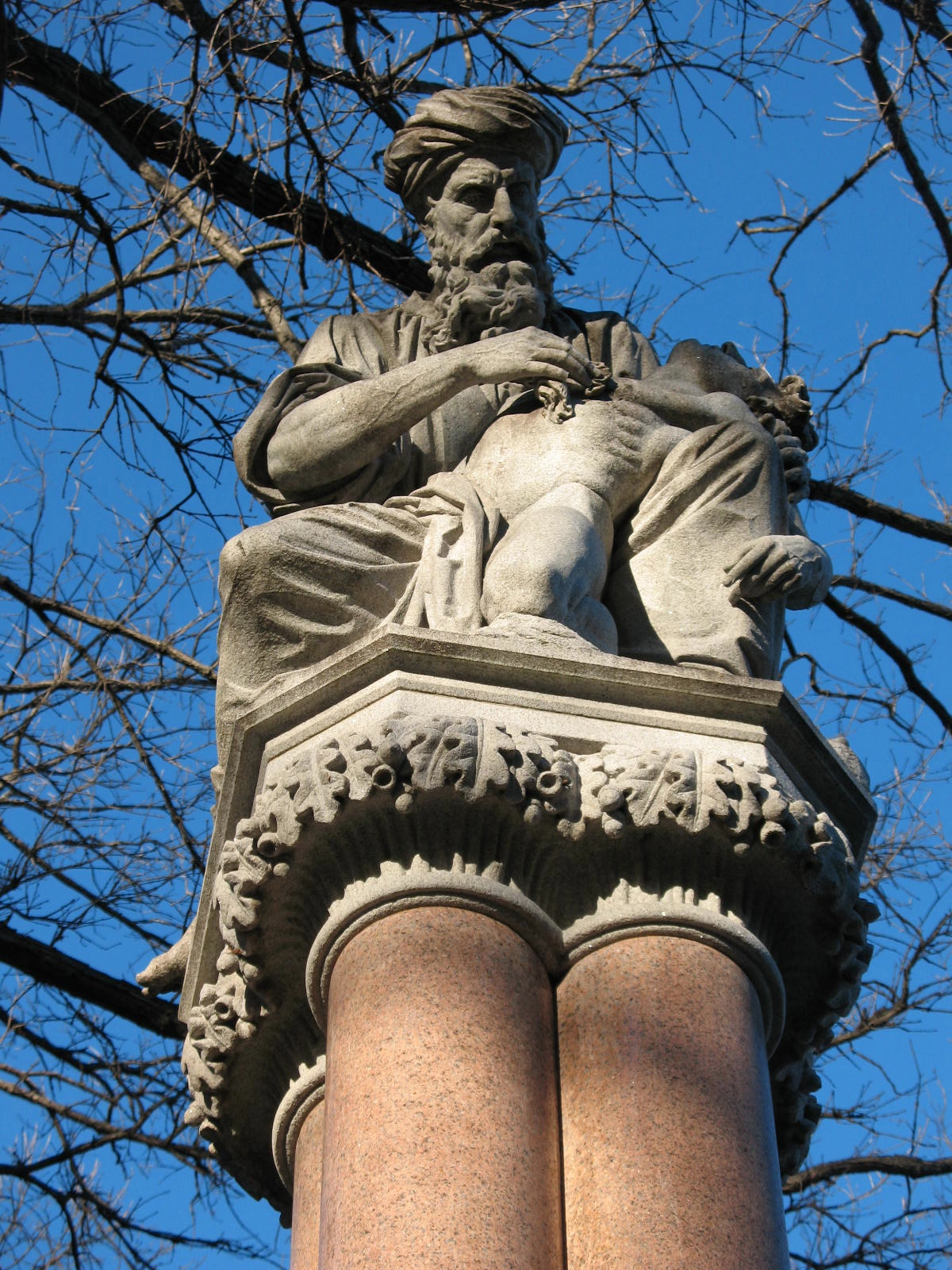
