= Diisopropyl ether =

Names
- Preferred IUPAC name 2-[(Propan-2-yl)oxy]propane
- Other names Isopropyl ether 2-Isopropoxypropane; Diisopropyl oxide DIPE

Identifiers
| CAS Number | 108-20-3 |
| 3D model (JSmol) | Interactive image |
| ChEMBL | ChEMBL3185565 |
| ChemSpider | 7626 |
| ECHA InfoCard | 100.003.237 |
| EC Number | 203-560-6 |
| PubChem CID | 7914 |
| RTECS number | TZ5425000 |
| UNII | DO7Y998826 |
| UN number | 1159 |
| CompTox Dashboard (EPA) | DTXSID4021890 |
- InChI: InChI=1S/C6H14O/c1-5(2)7-6(3)4/h5-6H,1-4H3 Key: ZAFNJMIOTHYJRJ-UHFFFAOYSA-N; InChI=1/C6H14O/c1-5(2)7-6(3)4/h5-6H,1-4H3 Key: ZAFNJMIOTHYJRJ-UHFFFAOYAC
- SMILES: O(C(C)C)C(C)C

Properties
| Chemical formula | C_{6}H_{14}O |
| Molar mass | 102.177 g·mol^{−1} |
| Appearance | Colorless liquid |
| Odor | Sharp, sweet, ether-like |
| Density | 0.725 g/ml |
| Melting point | −60 °C (−76 °F; 213 K) |
| Boiling point | 68.5 °C (155.3 °F; 341.6 K) |
| Solubility in water | 2 g/L at 20 °C |
| Vapor pressure | 119 mmHg (20°C) |
| Magnetic susceptibility (χ) | −79.4·10^{−6} cm^{3}/mol |

Hazards
- GHS labelling
| Pictograms | (GHS02: Flammable) (GHS07: Exclamation mark) (GHS08: Health hazard) |
| Signal word | Danger |
| Hazard statements | H225, H316, H319, H335, H336, H361, H371, H412 |
| Precautionary statements | P201, P202, P210, P233, P240, P241, P242, P243, P260, P264, P270, P271, P273, P280, P281, P303+P361+P353, P304+P340, P305+P351+P338, P308+P313, P309+P311, P312, P332+P313, P337+P313, P370+P378, P403+P233, P403+P235, P405, P501 |
| NFPA 704 (fire diamond) | 1 3 1 |
| Flash point | −28 °C (−18 °F; 245 K) |
| Autoignition temperature | 443 °C (829 °F; 716 K) |
| Explosive limits | 1.4–7.9% |
- Lethal dose or concentration (LD, LC)
| LD_{50} (median dose) | 8470 mg/kg (rat, oral) |
| LD_{Lo} (lowest published) | 5000-6500 mg/kg (rabbit, oral) |
| LC_{50} (median concentration) | 38,138 ppm (rat); 30,840 ppm (rabbit); 28,486 ppm (rabbit) |
- NIOSH (US health exposure limits)
| PEL (Permissible) | TWA 500 ppm (2100 mg/m^{3}) |
| REL (Recommended) | TWA 500 ppm (2100 mg/m^{3}) |
| IDLH (Immediate danger) | 1400 ppm |
- Except where otherwise noted, data are given for materials in their standard state (at 25 °C [77 °F], 100 kPa). verify (what is ?) Infobox references

Diisopropyl ether is a secondary ether that is used as a solvent. It is a colorless liquid that is slightly soluble in water, but miscible with organic solvents. It is also used as an oxygenate gasoline additive. It is obtained industrially as a byproduct in the production of isopropanol by hydration of propylene. Diisopropyl ether is sometimes represented by the abbreviation DIPE.

== Use as a solvent ==
Whereas at 20 °C, diethyl ether will dissolve 1% by weight water, diisopropyl ether dissolves 0.88%. Diisopropyl ether is used as a specialized solvent to remove or extract polar organic compounds from aqueous solutions, e.g. phenols, ethanol, acetic acid.

In the laboratory, diisopropyl ether is useful for recrystallizations because it has a wide liquid range. Diisopropyl ether is used for converting bromoboranes, which are thermally labile, into isopropoxy derivatives.

== Safety ==
Diisopropyl ether forms explosive organic peroxides similar to TATP upon standing in air. This reaction proceeds more easily than for diethyl ether due to the increased lability of the C-H bond adjacent to oxygen. Many explosions have been known to occur during handling of old diisopropyl ether bottles. Some laboratory procedures recommend use of freshly opened bottles. Antioxidants such as butylated hydroxytoluene can be used to prevent this process. The stored solvent is generally tested for the presence of peroxides. It is recommended to test once every 3 months for diisopropyl ether compared to once every 12 months for diethyl ether. Peroxides may be removed by stirring the ether with an aqueous solution of iron(II) sulfate (green vitriol) or sodium metabisulfite. For safety reasons, methyl tert-butyl ether is often used as an alternative solvent.

== See also ==
- Dimethyl ether
- Diethyl ether
- Dipropyl ether
- Di-tert-butyl ether
- Methyl tert-butyl ether
- List of gasoline additives
