= Diethyl ether peroxide =

Diethyl ether hydroperoxide

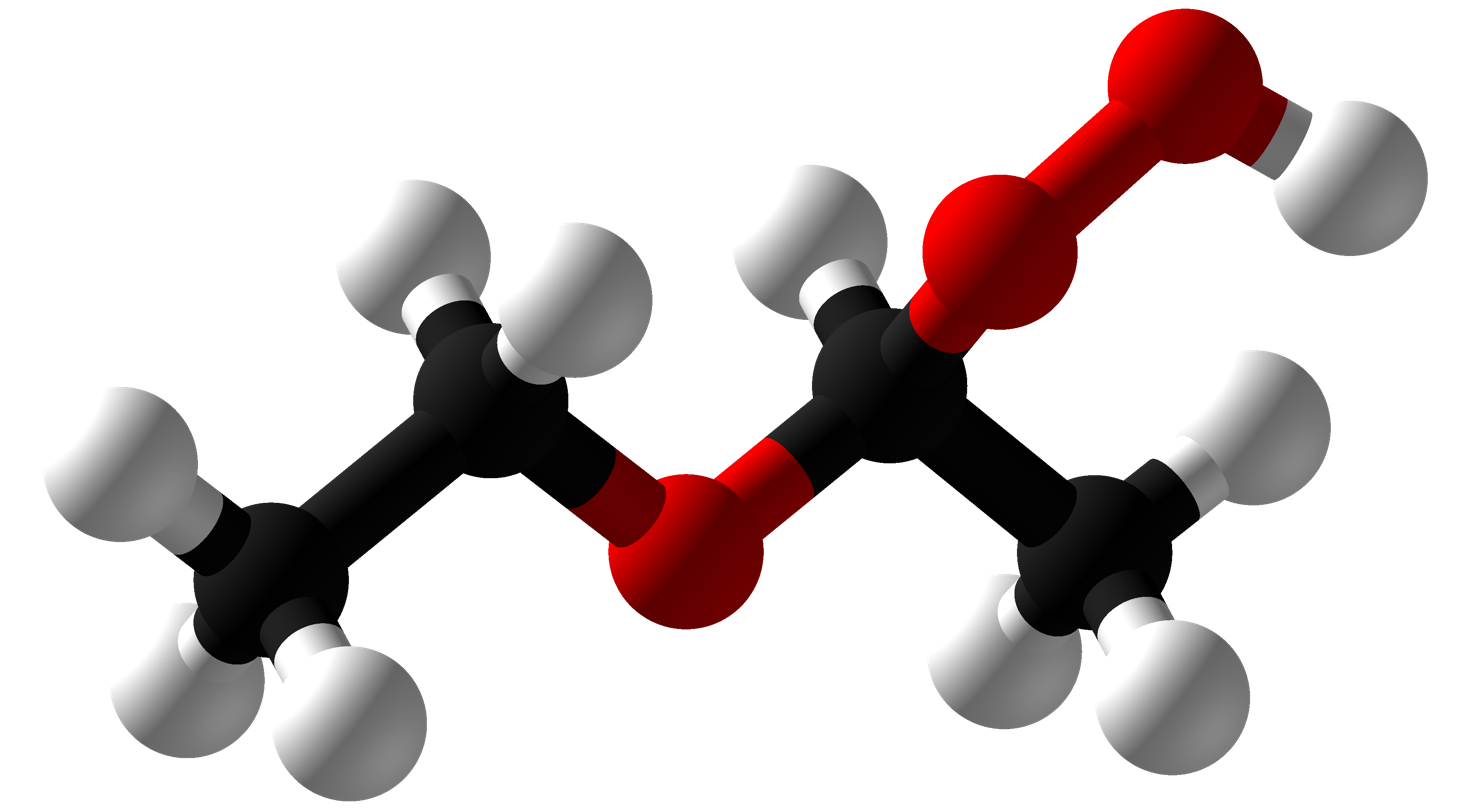

Identifiers
| CAS Number | 18321-53-4 |
| 3D model (JSmol) | Interactive image; Interactive image |
| ChemSpider | 19985446 |
| PubChem CID | 126387 |
| CompTox Dashboard (EPA) | DTXSID10893900 |
- InChI: InChI=1S/C4H10O3/c1-3-6-4(2)7-5/h4-5H,3H2,1-2H3 Key: CXWWPQGYBJCHJL-UHFFFAOYSA-N; InChI=1/C4H10O3/c1-3-6-4(2)7-5/h4-5H,3H2,1-2H3 Key: CXWWPQGYBJCHJL-UHFFFAOYAS
- SMILES: CCOC(OO)C; CC(OCC)OO

Properties
| Chemical formula | C_{4}H_{10}O_{3} |
| Molar mass | 106.121 g·mol^{−1} |
| Appearance | colorless liquid |
| Density | 1.005 g/cm^{3} |
| Boiling point | 62 to 64 °C (144 to 147 °F; 335 to 337 K) at 18.7 hPa (reduced pressure) |

Hazards
- Occupational safety and health (OHS/OSH)
| Main hazards | Explosive |
| NFPA 704 (fire diamond) | 2 4 4 |
- Except where otherwise noted, data are given for materials in their standard state (at 25 °C [77 °F], 100 kPa). verify (what is ?) Infobox references

Diethyl ether hydroperoxide is the organic compound with the formula C_{2}H_{5}OCH(OOH)CH_{3}. It is a colorless liquid. Diethyl ether hydroperoxide and its condensation products are responsible for the explosive organic peroxides that slowly form upon exposure of diethyl ether to ambient air and temperature conditions.

== Synthesis and reactions ==
Diethyl ether hydroperoxide can be formed by the photooxygenation of diethyl ether. This is a radical process, driven by UV excitation of molecular oxygen into a more reactive form. Its formation is usually undesirable due to the associated risk of explosion. For this reason, commercial samples of diethyl ether will usually contain antioxidants such as BHT and be contained in a material able to block UV rays, such as amber glass.

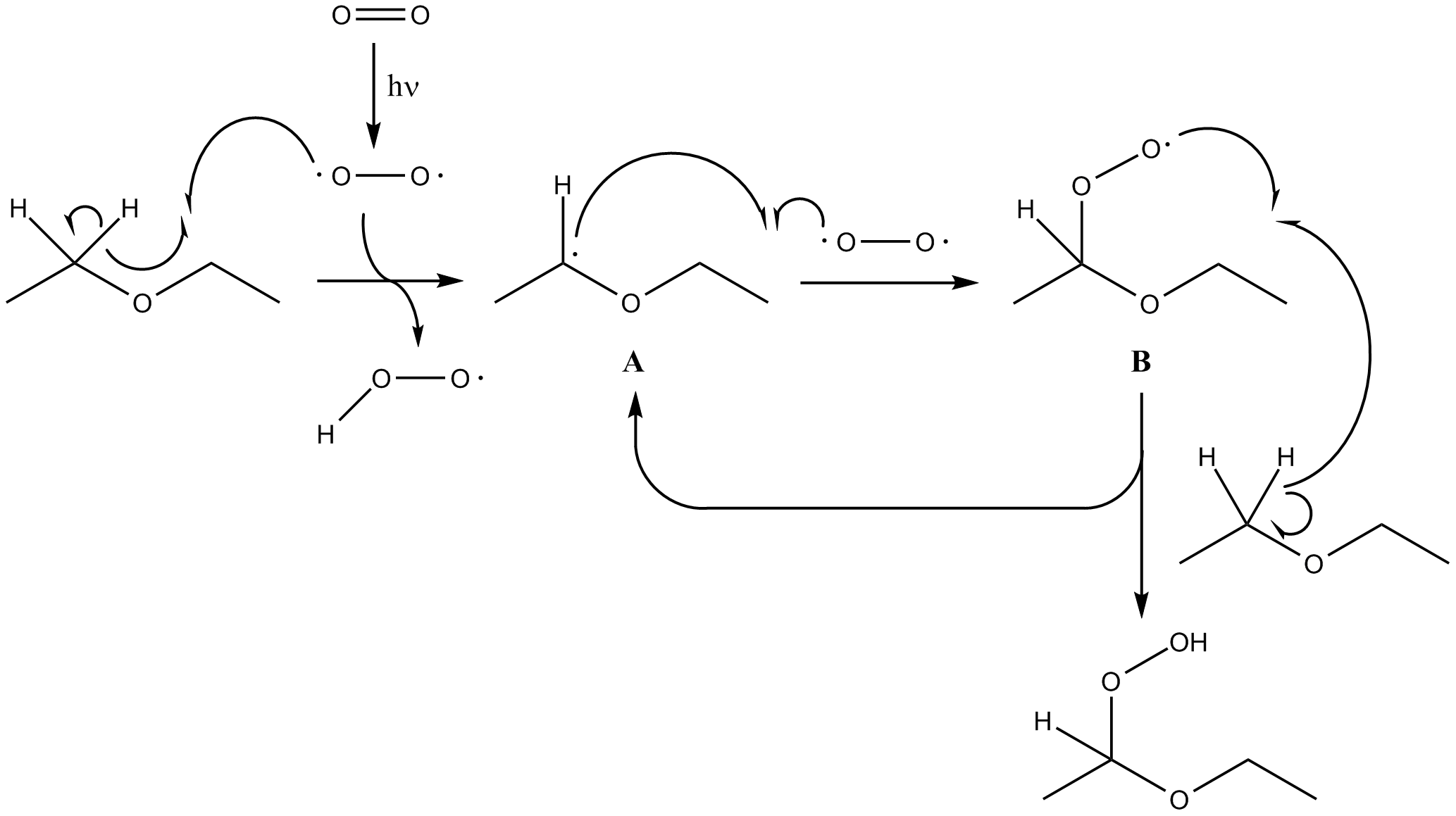

It can be intentionally prepared in high yield by the acid-catalyzed addition of hydrogen peroxide to ethyl vinyl ether:

C_{2}H_{5}OCH=CH_{2} + H_{2}O_{2} → C_{2}H_{5}OCH(OOH)CH_{3}

Related hydroperoxides can be produced similarly.

Diethyl ether hydroperoxide, upon heating in water, decomposes to acetaldehyde:

C_{2}H_{5}OCH(OOH)CH_{3} → CH_{3}CHO + C_{2}H_{5}OH + H_{2}O_{2}

Diethyl ether hydroperoxide forms polymers known as diethyl ether peroxide, or ethylidene peroxide:

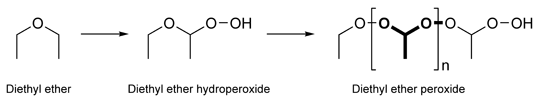

The peroxide is a colorless oil that is an extremely brisant and friction sensitive explosive material, however the polymeric materials are solid making them more dangerous as evaporation of the volatile diethyl ether can leave thin films of pure explosive.

== Tests ==
Diethyl ether peroxides can be detected with a potassium iodide (KI) solution in acetic acid or potassium iodide/starch paper. A positive test results in the formation of iodine (I_{2}) that causes a yellow or brown color of the ether phase or a dark bluish spot on the paper strip.
