= William Robert Ware =

American architect (1832–1915)

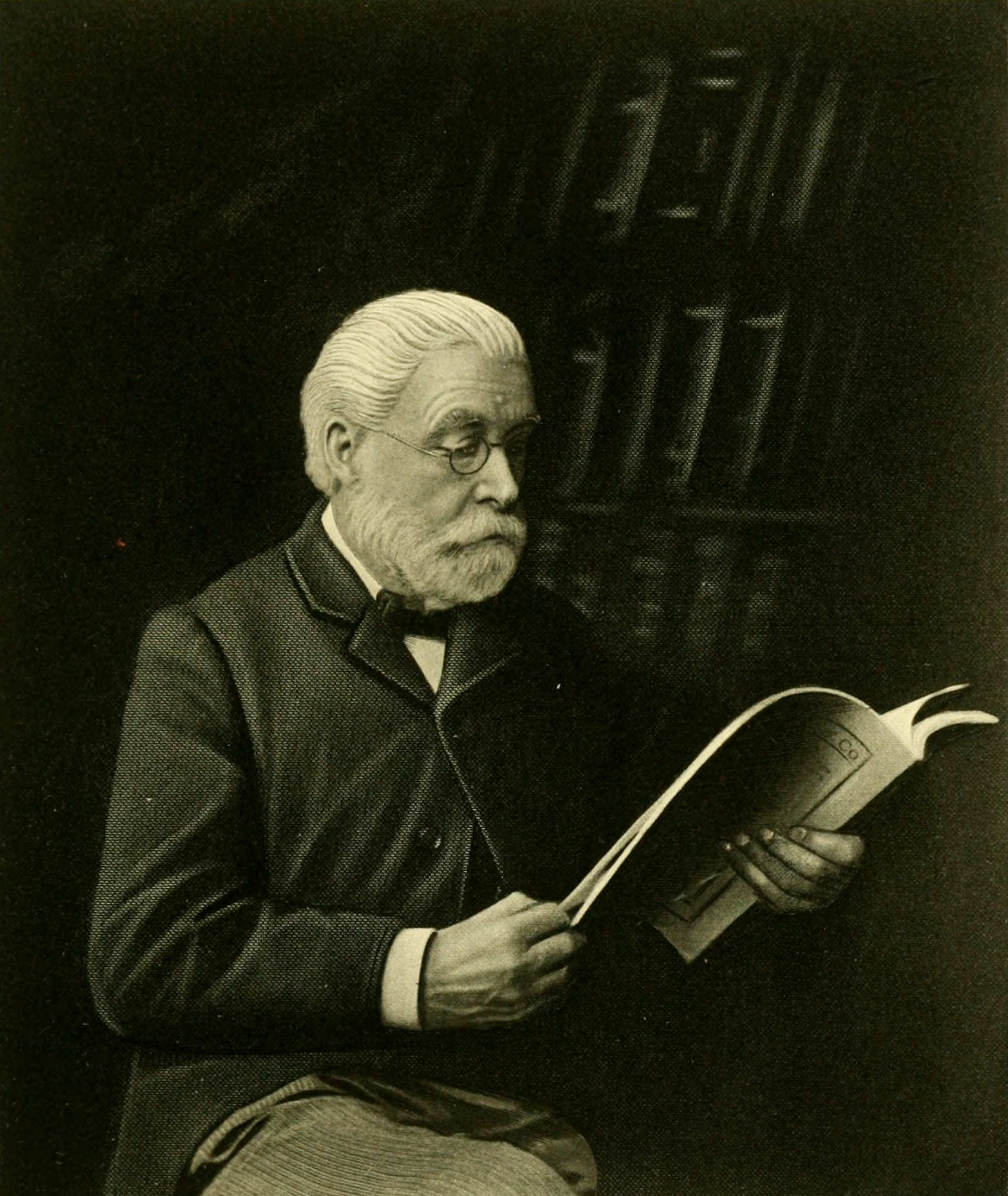
- Born: May 27, 1832; Cambridge, Massachusetts, US
- Died: June 9, 1915 (aged 83)
- Education: Harvard College; Lawrence Scientific School
- Occupation: Architect
- Practice: Philbrick and Ware; Ware & Van Brunt
- Buildings: Memorial and Weld Halls, Harvard; Ether Monument

William Robert Ware (May 27, 1832 – June 9, 1915) was an American architect, author, and founder of two important American architectural schools.

Born in Cambridge, Massachusetts, into a family of the Unitarian clergy, Ware received his own professional education at Milton Academy, Harvard College and Harvard's Lawrence Scientific School. In 1859, he began working for Richard Morris Hunt, the founder of the first American architectural school, the AIA, and the first American to graduate from the École des Beaux-Arts. Soon afterward Ware formed a partnership with the civil engineer Edward S. Philbrick, Philbrick and Ware, and they designed the Swedenborgian High Street Church in Brookline, Massachusetts.

In 1864, Ware partnered with fellow Harvard graduate Henry Van Brunt to form Ware & Van Brunt. Their Boston-area designs include Harvard's Memorial and Weld Halls, the Episcopal Divinity School campus in Cambridge, Massachusetts, the fountain at the Providence Athenaeum in Providence, Rhode Island, the Walter Hunnewell house (1875) at the Hunnewell estate in Wellesley (then West Needham), and the Ether Monument at the Boston Public Garden. In 1865, Ware became the first professor of architecture at the Massachusetts Institute of Technology. Architect Joseph Lyman Silsbee apprenticed under Ware and Van Brunt after graduating MIT in 1869.

In 1881, Ware and Van Brunt amicably dissolved their partnership, and Ware moved to New York City to found the School of Architecture at Columbia University, which began as the Architecture Department in the Columbia School of Mines. He retired in 1903 in poor health.

Ware also dabbled briefly in voting systems. He conducted a demonstration STV election of four favorite authors at Harvard University in 1871. At that time, he used the idea of the single transferable vote to devise what is now called, in the U.S., ranked choice voting or instant-runoff voting, later used in several English speaking countries.

Selected works

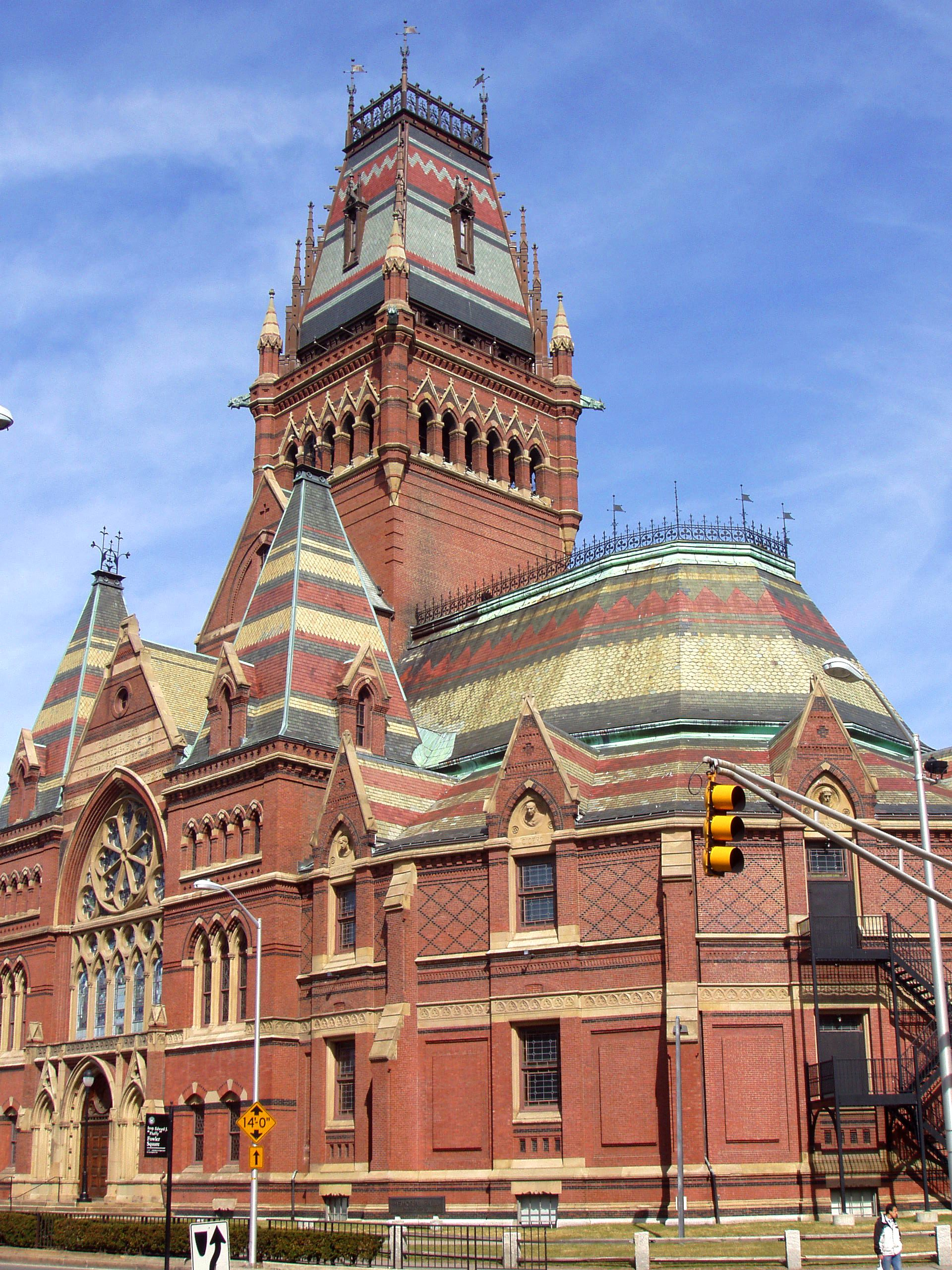
Memorial Hall (1870), Harvard University

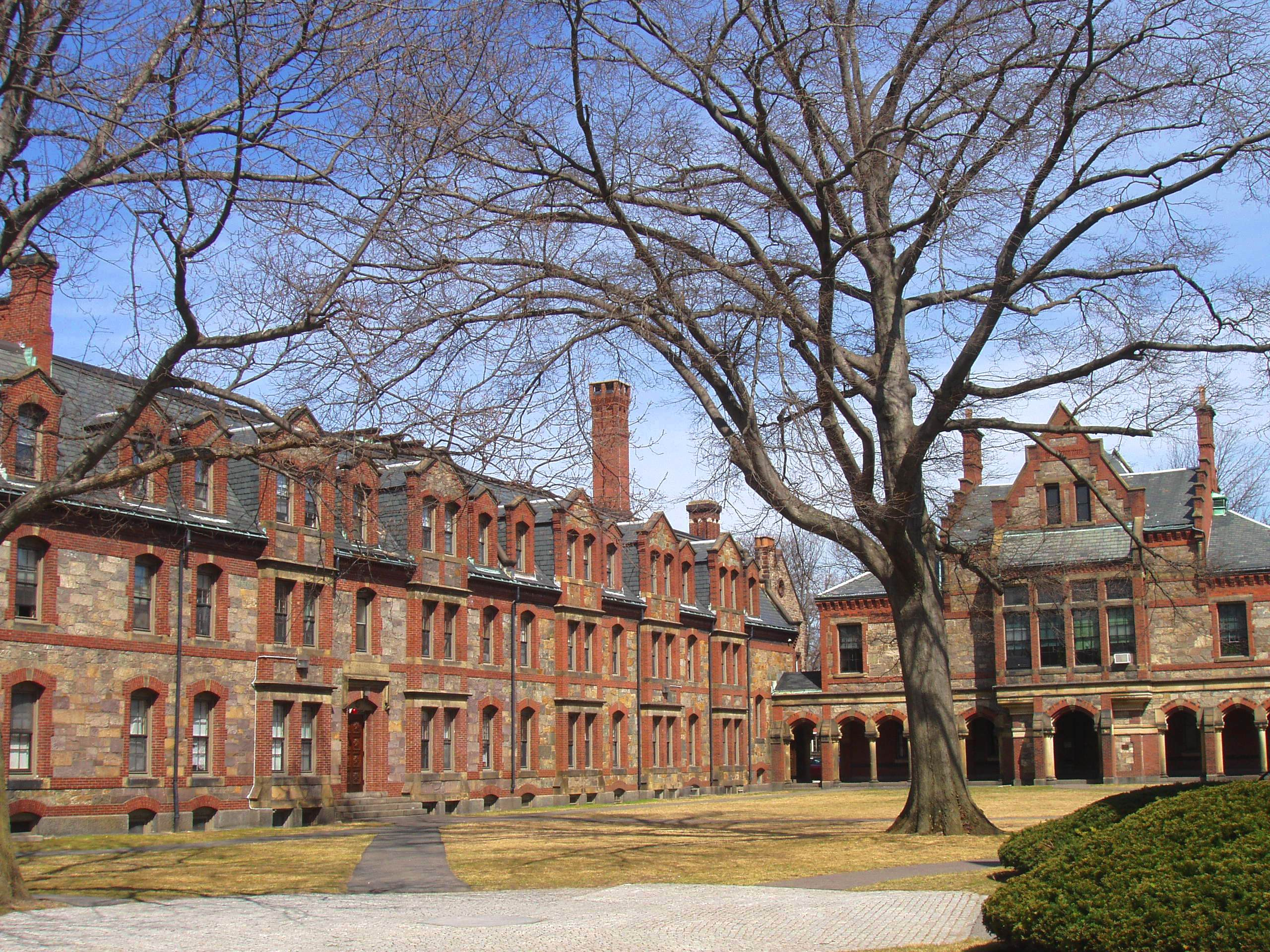
Lawrence and Reed Halls, Episcopal Divinity School

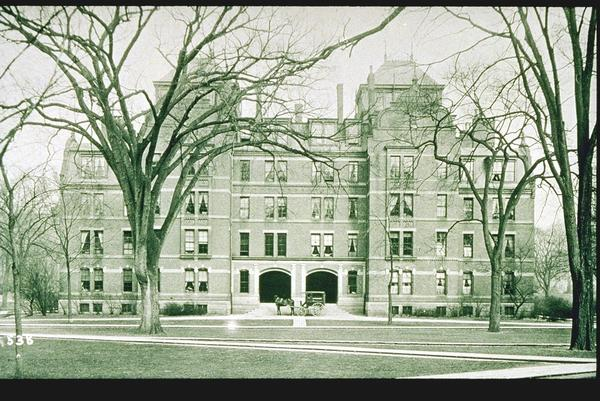
Weld Hall (1870), Harvard University

== Publications ==
- The American Vignola (1904)
- The Study of Architectural Drawing in the School of Architecture (1896)
- Modern Perspective: A Treatise Upon the Principles and Practice of Plane and Cylindrical Perspective (1882)
- The Machinery of Politics and Proportional Representation (1872)

== See Also ==
- List of American architects
