= Ernest Board =

British painter (1877–1934)

- Born: 24 August 1877
- Died: 17 April 1935 (aged 57)
- Education: Academy of Fine Arts

Ernest Board (1877–1934) was an English painter, notably of seascapes and historical subjects. He was also a draughtsman for glass painting.

Ernest Board was born on 24 August 1877 in a seaside town in the south of England. His life and career were marked by a passion for portraying seascapes. From a young age, Board showed a deep interest in art, and he went on to study at The Academy of Fine Arts in London.

Throughout his career, Board participated in several exhibitions, both individual and group, where his works have won recognition and awards. He was also a dedicated educator. After his death on 17 April 1935, his paintings remained in private collections and art galleries. Board is remembered as one of the great representatives of marine art.

== Sources ==
- Risch-Stolz, Marianne (2021). "Board, Ernest". Allgemeines Künstlerlexikon (online ed.). Berlin, New York: K. G. Saur.
- "Board, Ernest". Benezit Dictionary of Artists (online ed.). Oxford University Press. 2011. doi:10.1093/benz/9780199773787.article.B00021279.
