= USS Instill =

Minesweeper of the United States Navy

History

United States
- Name: USS Instill (AM-252)
- Builder: Savannah Machine and Foundry Company, Savannah, Georgia
- Laid down: 24 November 1943
- Launched: 5 March 1944
- Sponsored by: Mrs. Lydia G. Mehoffey
- Commissioned: 22 May 1944
- Decommissioned: 26 February 1947
- Recommissioned: 16 March 1951
- Decommissioned: 1 March 1954
- Reclassified: MSF-252, 7 February 1955
- Stricken: 1 May 1962
- Fate: Transferred to Mexican Navy, October 1962

History

Mexico
- Name: ARM DM-10
- Acquired: October 1962
- Stricken: 1986
- Fate: unknown

General characteristics
- Class & type: Admirable-class minesweeper
- Displacement: 650 long tons (660 t)
- Length: 184 ft 6 in (56.24 m)
- Beam: 33 ft (10 m)
- Draft: 9 ft 9 in (2.97 m)
- Propulsion: 2 × ALCO 539 diesel engines, 1,710 shp (1,280 kW); Farrel-Birmingham single reduction gear; 2 shafts
- Speed: 15 knots (28 km/h)
- Complement: 104
- Armament: 1 × 3"/50 caliber (76 mm) DP gun; 2 × twin Bofors 40 mm guns; 1 × Hedgehog anti-submarine mortar; 2 × Depth charge tracks

Service record
- Part of: U.S. Atlantic Fleet (1944–1947); Atlantic Reserve Fleet (1947–1951, 1954–1962); U.S. Pacific Fleet (1951–1954); Mexican Navy (1962–1986)

USS Instill (AM-252) was an Admirable-class minesweeper built for the United States Navy during World War II. She saw service in the Atlantic during World War II. She was decommissioned in February 1947 and placed in reserve. Instill was recommissioned in March 1951 during the Korean War and remained in commission until March 1954, when she was placed in reserve again. While she remained in reserve, Instill was reclassified as MSF-252 in February 1955 but never reactivated. In October 1962, she was sold to the Mexican Navy and renamed ARM DM-10. She was stricken from Mexican Navy service in 1986, but her ultimate fate is not reported in secondary sources.

== U.S. Navy career ==
Instill was launched 5 March 1944 by the Savannah Machine & Foundry Co., Savannah, Georgia; sponsored by Mrs. Lydia G. Mehoffey; and commissioned 22 May 1944.

After shakedown out of Little Creek, Virginia, and a few weeks of escort duty in that area, Instill was assigned to Service Force, Atlantic Fleet as a training ship. This duty continued until 11 August when she reported to Guantanamo Bay, Cuba, to operate with shakedown ships as a radar countermeasure ship. Returning to Norfolk, Virginia, 22 October, Instill remained there until 21 January 1946 when she sailed to Orange, Texas. The minesweeper decommissioned there 26 February 1947, joining the Reserve Fleet.

After the outbreak of the Korean War, Instill recommissioned 16 March 1951 and began an intensive period of training and patrol duty between Charleston, South Carolina, and Norfolk, Virginia. She continued her important minesweeping operations and patrol duty along the U.S. East Coast until she returned to Orange, Texas, 3 January 1954.

Instill decommissioned there 1 March and once again joined the Reserve Fleet. Reclassified MSF-252, 7 February 1955, she remained in the Texas Group, Atlantic Reserve Fleet until struck from the Navy List 1 May 1962, and sold in October 1962 to Mexico, and served as DM-10.

== Mexican Navy career ==
The former Instill was acquired by the Mexican Navy in October 1962 and renamed ARM DM-10. She was stricken from Mexican Navy service in 1986, but her ultimate fate is not reported in secondary sources.
