= Carbureted compression ignition model engine =

Type of carbureted engine

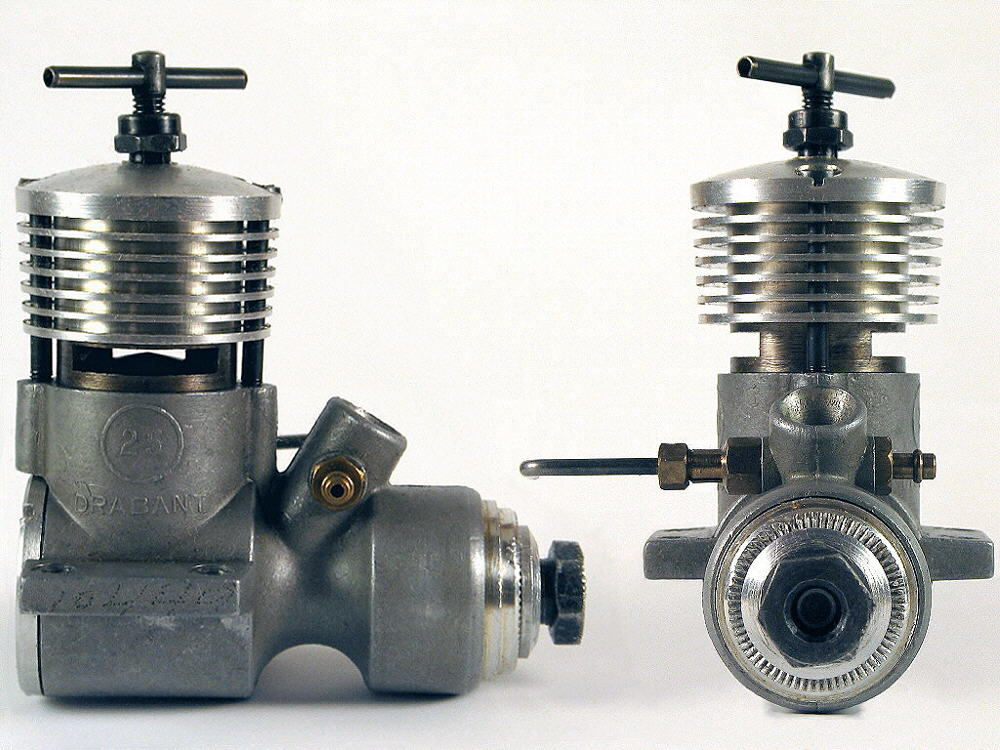
Miniature two-stroke "diesel engine". Note the T-bar on top for adjusting the compression

A carbureted compression ignition model engine, popularly known as a model diesel engine, is a simple compression ignition engine made for model propulsion, usually model aircraft but also model boats. These are quite similar to the typical glow-plug engine that runs on a mixture of methanol-based fuels with a hot wire filament to provide ignition. Despite their name, their use of compression ignition, and the use of a kerosene fuel that is similar to diesel, model diesels share very little with full-size diesel engines.

== Comparison with full-size engines ==
Full-size diesel engines, such as those found in a truck, are fuel injected and either two-stroke or four-stroke. They use compression ignition to ignite the mixture: the compression within the cylinder heats the inlet charge sufficiently to cause ignition, without requiring any external ignition source. A fundamental feature of such engines, unlike petrol (gasoline) engines, is that they draw in air alone and the fuel is only mixed by being injected into the combustion chamber separately. Model diesel engines are instead a carbureted two-stroke using the crankcase for charge-air compression. The carburetor supplies a mixture of fuel and air into the engine, with the proportions kept fairly constant and their total volume throttled to control the engine power. Apart from sharing the diesel's use of compression ignition, their construction has more in common with a small two-stroke motorcycle or lawnmower engine.

== Variable compression ==
Model diesels have variable compression ratios. This variable compression is achieved by a "contra-piston," at the top of the cylinder, which can be adjusted by a screwed "T-bar". The swept volume of the engine remains the same, but as the volume of the combustion chamber at top dead center is changed by adjusting the contra-piston, the compression ratio (swept volume + combustion chamber / combustion chamber) changes accordingly. There also exist model diesels with fixed compression heads. A few examples are the British 5 cc OWAT or the American DRONE. These engines have a fixed compression ratio, but the compression can be altered slightly with the use of more or less lubrication oil in the fuel. Also the engine's load affects the compression and ignition timing. Larger propellers give a longer combustion time and so higher compression. Smaller propellers reduce the load, and therefore the compression pressure build up, which changes the ignition timing to earlier.

== Advantages ==
Model diesels are found to produce more torque than glow engines of the same displacement, and are thought to get better fuel efficiency, because the same power is produced at lower rpm, and in a smaller displacement engine. However, the specific power may not be significantly superior to a glow engine, due to the heavier construction needed to assure that the engine can withstand the much higher compression ratio, sometimes as high as 30:1. Diesels also run significantly quieter, due to the more rapid combustion, unlike glow engines, in which combustion may still be occurring when the exhaust ports are uncovered, causing a significant amount of noise.

== Disadvantages ==
Compared to glow plug engines, model diesels are more difficult to throttle over a wide range of powers, making them less suitable for radio-controlled models than either two or four stroke glow-plug engines although this difference is claimed to be less noticeable with the use of modern schnuerle-ported engines.

== Fuel ==
These "diesels" run on a mixture of kerosene, ethanol, ether, castor oil or vegetable oil, and cetane or amyl nitrite booster. The fuel used contains Diethyl ether, which is highly volatile and has an extremely low flash point, combined with kerosene and a lubricant plus a very small proportion (typically 2%) of ignition improver such as Amyl nitrite or preferably Isopropyl nitrate nowadays. The lubricant in the fuel implements total loss oiling.

== Starting ==
The engine is started by reducing the compression and setting the spray bar mixture rich with the adjustable needle valve, gradually increasing the compression while cranking the engine. The compression is increased until the engine starts running. The mixture can then be leaned out and the compression increased. Compared to glow plug engines, model diesel engines exhibit much higher fuel economy, thus increasing endurance for the amount of fuel carried. They also exhibit higher torque, enabling the turning of a larger or higher pitched propeller at lower speed, and reducing compression will compensate for the earlier ignition at this lower speed. Since the combustion occurs well before the exhaust port is uncovered, these engines are also considerably quieter (when unmuffled) than glow-plug engines of similar displacement.

== See also ==
- Variable compression ratio
