= Di-n-propyl ether =

Names
- Preferred IUPAC name 1-Propoxypropane
- Other names Propyl ether, di- Dipropyl ether, normal isomer Di-n-propyl ether

Identifiers
| CAS Number | 111-43-3 |
| 3D model (JSmol) | Interactive image |
| ChemSpider | 7823 |
| ECHA InfoCard | 100.003.518 |
| PubChem CID | 8114 |
| UNII | 42Q250HS4G |
| CompTox Dashboard (EPA) | DTXSID8042343 |
- InChI: InChI=1S/C6H14O/c1-3-5-7-6-4-2/h3-6H2,1-2H3 Key: POLCUAVZOMRGSN-UHFFFAOYSA-N; InChI=1/C6H14O/c1-3-5-7-6-4-2/h3-6H2,1-2H3 Key: POLCUAVZOMRGSN-UHFFFAOYAT
- SMILES: O(CCC)CCC

Properties
| Chemical formula | C_{6}H_{14}O |
| Molar mass | 102.177 g·mol^{−1} |
| Appearance | Colorless liquid |
| Density | 0.75 g/cm^{3} |
| Melting point | −122 °C (−188 °F; 151 K) |
| Boiling point | 90 °C (194 °F; 363 K) |
| Solubility in water | 3 g/L (20 °C) |

Hazards
| NFPA 704 (fire diamond) | 1 3 1 |
| Flash point | −18 °C (0 °F; 255 K) |
- Except where otherwise noted, data are given for materials in their standard state (at 25 °C [77 °F], 100 kPa). Infobox references

Dipropyl ether is the symmetrical ether of two n-propyl groups. It is a colorless, flammable liquid with a sweet odor typical of ethers.

== Preparation ==
=== Acid catalyzed ether synthesis ===
Dipropyl ether can be synthesized by reacting two molecules of n-propanol in the presence of p-toluenesulfonic acid (a strong acid) and heat, in the same way other symmetrical ethers may be formed.

=== Williamson ether synthesis ===
This ether may also be prepared by way of the Williamson ether synthesis in which n-propoxide, the conjugate base of n-propanol, is reacted with an n-propyl halide:

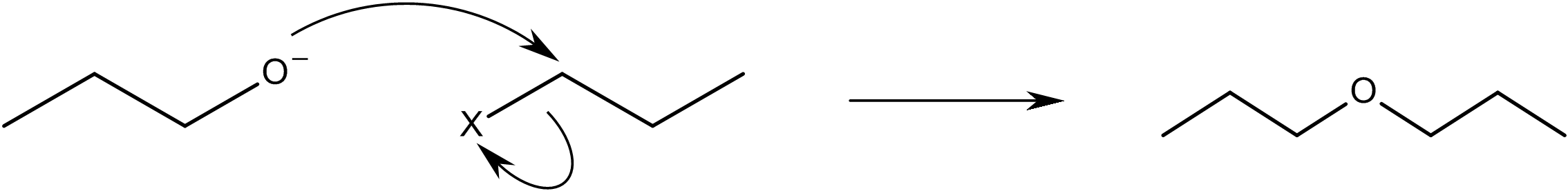

== Safety ==
As is typical of ethers, dipropyl ether may slowly form explosive organic peroxides over long periods in storage. Antioxidants such as butylated hydroxytoluene are often added to ethers to prevent this process.

Due to the shock and light sensitive nature of organic peroxides, dipropyl ether should never be boiled or evaporated to dryness. This concentrates peroxides that may be present, which can then detonate unexpectedly destroying the vessel in which they have deposited or igniting nearby flammable liquids.

== See also ==
- Diisopropyl ether
