= Drug instillation =

Drug instillation, also known as medication instillation, is the administration of a medicine, generally in liquid form, either drop by drop or with a catheter, into a body space or cavity. Drop by drop administration may be done for eye drops, ear drops, or nose drops. A catheter can be used to perform intravesical drug delivery into the urinary bladder. It differs from therapeutic irrigation in that the irrigation solution is removed within minutes, but the instillate is left in place.
