= Activated carbon =

Form of carbon with an extremely high surface area

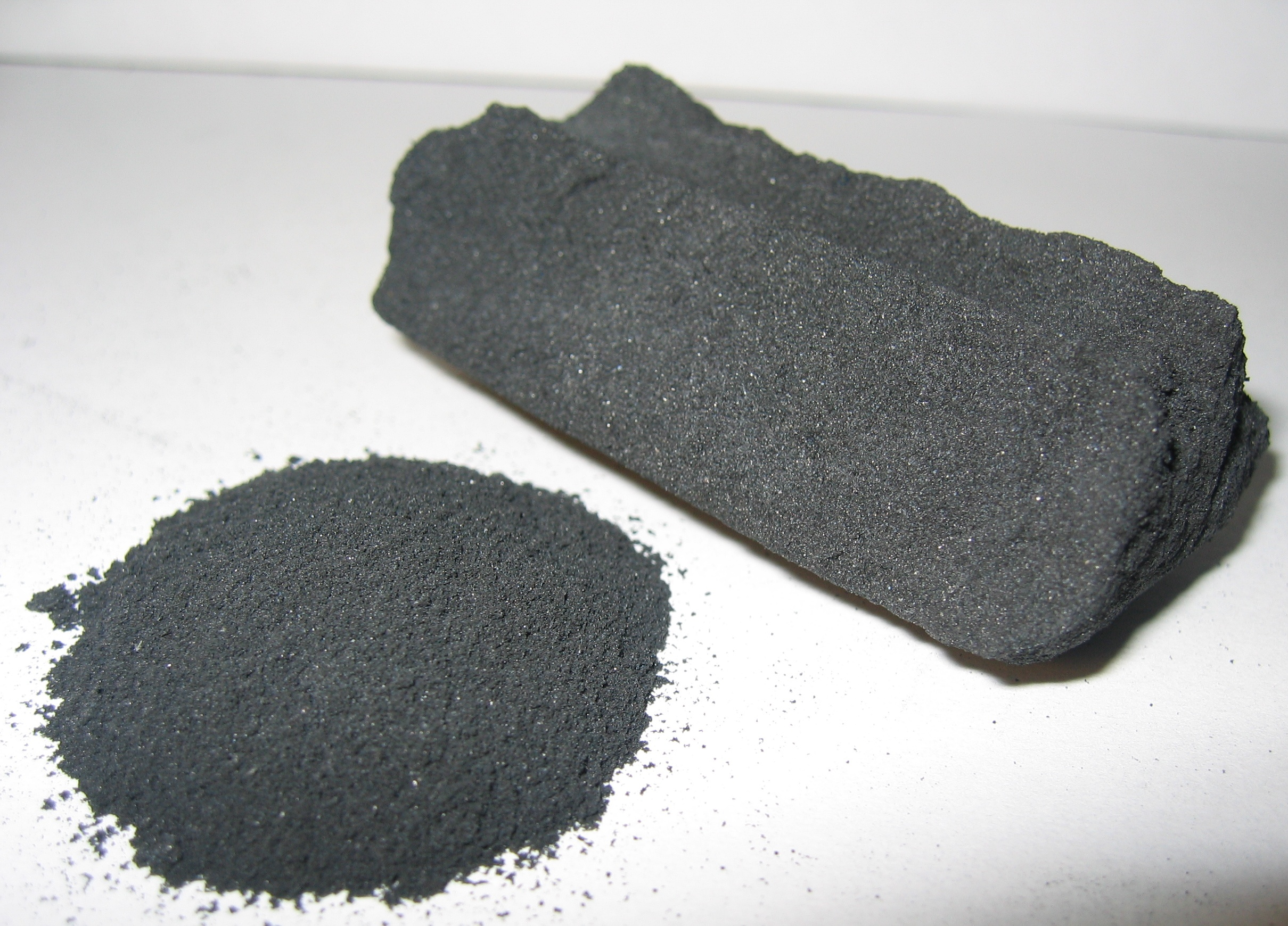
Activated carbon

Activated carbon, also called activated charcoal, is a form of carbon commonly used to filter contaminants from water and air, among many other uses. It is processed (activated) to have small, low-volume pores that greatly increase the surface area available for adsorption or chemical reactions. Adsorption, not to be confused with absorption, is a process where atoms or molecules adhere to a surface. Activated carbon is sometimes referred to as active carbon.

Because it is so porous on a microscopic scale, activated carbon has a surface area of over 3,000 square metres per gram (920,000 square feet per ounce), as determined by gas absorption, and its porosity can run 10ML/day in terms of treated water per gram. Researchers at Cornell University synthesized an ultrahigh surface area activated carbon with a BET area of 4,800 m^{2}/g (1,500,000 sq ft/oz). This BET area value is the highest reported in the literature for activated carbon. For charcoal, the equivalent figure before activation is about 2–5 square metres per gram (610–1,530 sq ft/oz). A useful activation level may be obtained solely from the high surface area. Further chemical treatment often enhances adsorption properties.

Activated carbon is usually derived from waste products such as coconut husks in addition to other agricultural wastes like olive stones, rice husks and nutshells which are being upcycled into activated carbon, diversifying feedstock supply. Waste from paper mills has been studied as a possible source of activated carbon. These bulk sources are converted into charcoal before being activated. Using waste streams not only reduces landfill burden but also works to lower the overall carbon footprint as previously discarded waste is repurposed. When derived from coal, it is referred to as activated coal. Activated coke is derived from coke. In activated-coke production, the raw coke (most commonly petroleum coke) is ground or pelletized, then "activated" via physical (steam or CO_{2} at high temperature) or chemical (e.g., KOH or H_{3}PO_{4}) methods to introduce a porous network, yielding a high-surface-area adsorbent which is referred to as activated coal.

== Uses ==
Activated carbon is used in methane and hydrogen storage, air purification, capacitive deionization, supercapacitive swing adsorption, solvent recovery, decaffeination, gold purification, metal extraction, water purification, medicine, sewage treatment, air filters in respirators, filters in compressed air, teeth whitening, production of hydrogen chloride, edible electronics, and many other applications. These multiuse applications make it a versatile form of carbon that is used daily in many industries.

=== Industrial ===
There are many industrial applications of activated carbon and its other forms such as areas like metal extraction, water purification, sewage treatment, metal finishing and more. For example, it is the main purification technique for removing organic impurities from bright nickel plating solutions used for metal finishing plants. Expanding on electroplating, a variety of organic chemicals can be added to the plating solutions for improving their deposit qualities and for enhancing properties like brightness, smoothness, ductility, etc. This is due to the passage of direct current and electrolytic reactions of anodic oxidation and cathodic reduction, organic additives generate unwanted breakdown products in solution. Their excessive build up in the solutions can adversely affect plating quality and physical properties of deposited metal if run untreated by the filters. Activated carbon treatment removes such impurities and restores plating performance to the desired level. Its installation costs may vary according to the volume of water it must process, however the average cost can be around USD 1 - 2 million. Additionally, these filters need replacing over time (typically 6–12 months depending on usage). The cost of replacing the carbon in the GAC filter form is about USD 0.05 - 0.1 per cubic meter of water that is treated in the plant.

=== Medical ===
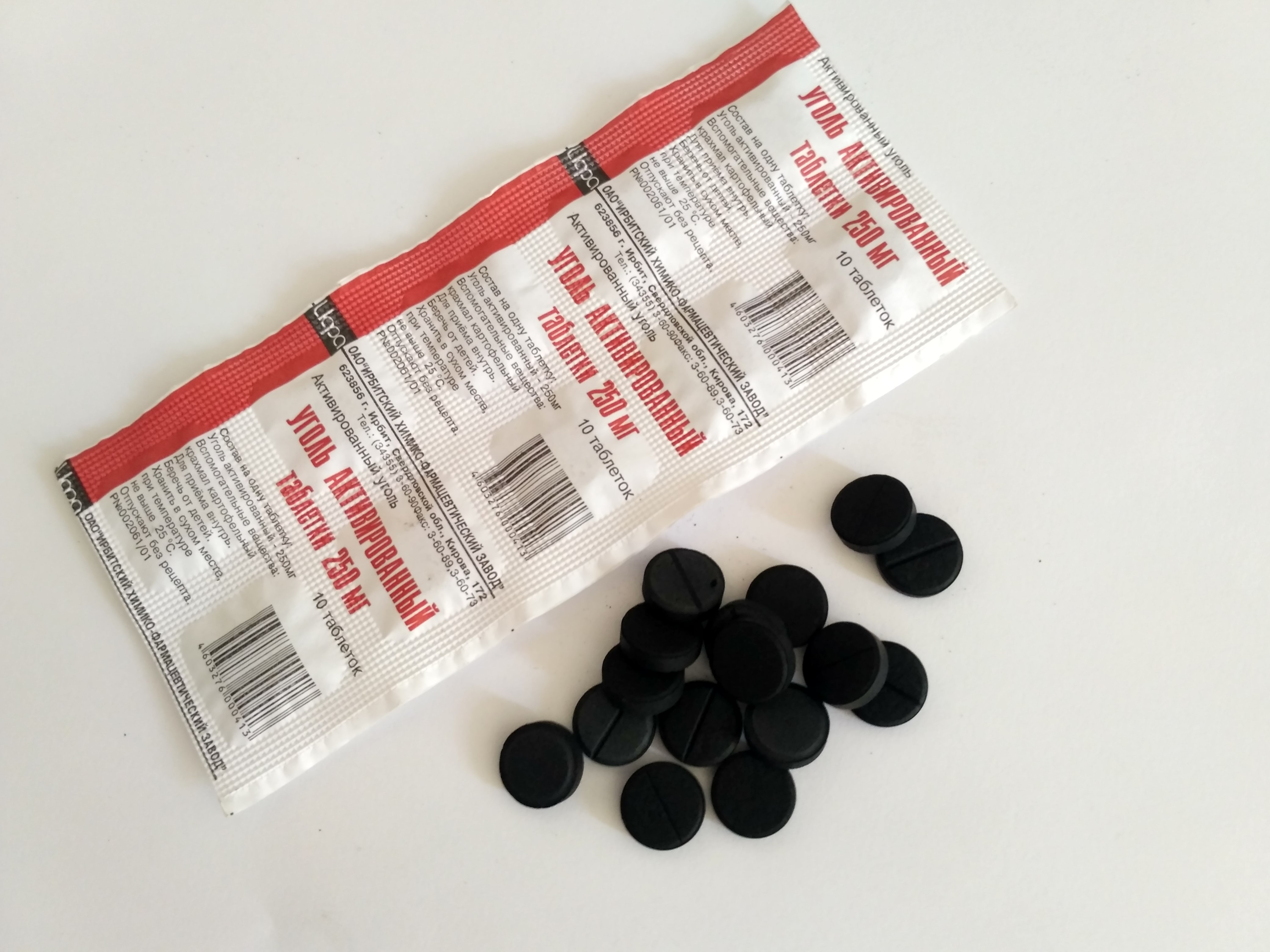
Activated charcoal for medical use

Activated carbon is used to treat poisonings and overdoses following oral ingestion. Tablets or capsules of activated carbon are used in many countries as an over-the-counter drug to treat diarrhea, indigestion, and flatulence. However, activated charcoal shows no effect on intestinal gas and diarrhea, is ordinarily medically ineffective if poisoning resulted from ingestion of corrosive agents, boric acid, or petroleum products, and is particularly ineffective against poisonings of strong acids or bases, cyanide, iron, lithium, arsenic, methanol, ethanol, or ethylene glycol. Activated carbon will not prevent these chemicals from being absorbed into the human body. It is on the World Health Organization's List of Essential Medicines.

Incorrect application (e.g. into the lungs) results in pulmonary aspiration, which can sometimes be fatal if immediate medical treatment is not initiated.

=== Analytical chemistry ===
Activated carbon, in 50% w/w combination with celite, is used as stationary phase in low-pressure chromatographic separation of carbohydrates (mono-, di-, tri-saccharides) using ethanol solutions (5–50%) as mobile phase in analytical or preparative protocols.

Activated carbon is useful for extracting the direct oral anticoagulants (DOACs) such as dabigatran, apixaban, rivaroxaban and edoxaban from blood plasma samples. For this purpose it has been made into "minitablets", each containing 5 mg activated carbon for treating 1ml samples of DOAC. Since this activated carbon has no effect on blood clotting factors, heparin or most other anticoagulants this allows a plasma sample to be analyzed for abnormalities otherwise affected by the DOACs.

=== Environmental ===
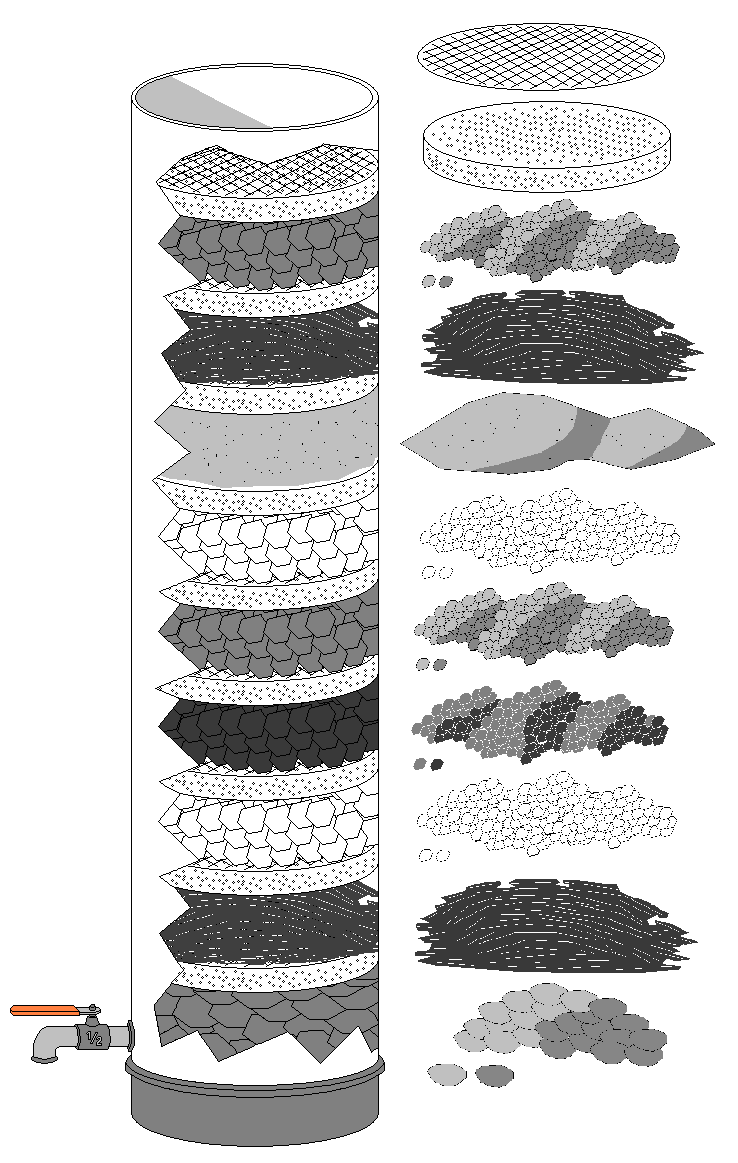
Activated carbon is usually used in water filtration systems. In this illustration, the activated carbon is in the fourth level (counted from bottom).

Carbon adsorption has numerous applications in removing pollutants from air or water streams both in the field and in industrial processes such as:

- Spill cleanup
- Groundwater remediation
- Drinking water filtration
- Wastewater treatment
- Air purification
- Volatile organic compounds capture from painting, dry cleaning, gasoline dispensing operations, and other processes
- Volatile organic compounds recovery (SRU, Solvent Recovery Unit; SRP, Solvent Recovery Plant; SRS, Solvent Recovery System) from flexible packaging, converting, coating, and other processes.

During early implementation of the 1974 Safe Drinking Water Act in the US, EPA officials developed a rule that proposed requiring drinking water treatment systems to use granular activated carbon. Because of its high cost, the so-called GAC rule encountered strong opposition across the country from the water supply industry, including the largest water utilities in California. Hence, the agency set aside the rule. Activated carbon filtration is an effective water treatment method due to its multi-functional nature. There are specific types of activated carbon filtration methods and equipment that are indicated – depending upon the contaminants involved.

In wastewater treatment, granulated activated carbon filters are implemented as an additional treatment step for removal of organic micropollutants such as pharmaceutical products, many of which are not entirely removed in traditional wastewater treatment processes. Pollutants adsorb to the activated carbon granules and are then degraded by microorganisms on the filters.

Activated carbon is also used for the measurement of radon concentration in air.

Biomass waste-derived activated carbons were also successfully used for the removal of caffeine and paracetamol from water.

=== Agricultural ===
Activated carbon (charcoal) is an allowed substance used by organic farmers in both livestock production and wine making. In livestock production it is used as a pesticide, animal feed additive, processing aid, nonagricultural ingredient and disinfectant. In organic winemaking, activated carbon is allowed for use as a processing agent to adsorb brown color pigments from white grape concentrates. It is sometimes used as biochar.

=== Distilled alcoholic beverage purification ===
Activated carbon filters (AC filters) can be used to filter vodka and whiskey of organic impurities which can affect color, taste, and odor. Passing an organically impure vodka through an activated carbon filter at the proper flow rate will result in vodka with an identical alcohol content and significantly increased organic purity, as judged by odor and taste.

=== Fuel storage ===
Research is being done testing various activated carbons' ability to store natural gas and hydrogen gas. The porous material acts like a sponge for different types of gases. The gas is attracted to the carbon material via Van der Waals forces. Some carbons have been able to achieve binding energies of 5–10 kJ per mol. The gas may then be desorbed when subjected to higher temperatures and either combusted to do work or in the case of hydrogen gas extracted for use in a hydrogen fuel cell. Gas storage in activated carbons is an appealing gas storage method because the gas can be stored in a low pressure, low mass, low volume environment that would be much more feasible than bulky on-board pressure tanks in vehicles. The United States Department of Energy has specified certain goals to be achieved in the area of research and development of nano-porous carbon materials. All of the goals are yet to be satisfied but numerous institutions, including the ALL-CRAFT program, are continuing to conduct work in this field.

=== Gas purification ===
Filters with activated carbon are usually used in compressed air and gas purification to remove oil vapors, odor, and other hydrocarbons from the air. The most common designs use a 1-stage or 2 stage filtration principle in which activated carbon is embedded inside the filter media.

Activated carbon filters are used to retain radioactive gases within the air vacuumed from a nuclear boiling water reactor turbine condenser. The large charcoal beds adsorb these gases and retain them while they rapidly decay to nonradioactive solid species. The solids are trapped in the charcoal particles, while the filtered air passes through.

=== Chemical purification ===
Activated carbon is commonly used on the laboratory scale to purify solutions of organic molecules containing unwanted colored organic impurities.

Filtration over activated carbon is used in large scale fine chemical and pharmaceutical processes for the same purpose. The carbon is either mixed with the solution then filtered off or immobilized in a filter.

=== Mercury scrubbing ===
Activated carbon, often infused with sulfur or iodine, is widely used to trap mercury emissions from coal-fired power stations, medical incinerators, and from natural gas at the wellhead. However, despite its effectiveness, activated carbon is expensive to use.

Since it is often not recycled, the mercury-laden activated carbon presents a disposal dilemma. If the activated carbon contains less than 260 ppm mercury, United States federal regulations allow it to be stabilized (for example, trapped in concrete) for landfilling. However, waste containing greater than 260 ppm is considered to be in the high-mercury subcategory and is banned from landfilling (Land-Ban Rule). This material is now accumulating in warehouses and in deep abandoned mines at an estimated rate of 100 tons per year.

The problem of disposal of mercury-laden activated carbon is not unique to the United States. In the Netherlands, this mercury is largely recovered and the activated carbon is disposed of by complete burning, forming carbon dioxide (CO_{2}).

=== Food additive ===
Activated, food-grade charcoal became a food trend in 2016, being used as an additive to impart a "slightly smoky" taste and a dark coloring to products including hotdogs, ice cream, pizza bases, and bagels. People taking medication, including birth control pills and antidepressants, are advised to avoid novelty foods or drinks that use activated charcoal coloring since it can render the medication ineffective.

=== Smoking filtration ===
Activated charcoal is used in smoking filters as a way to reduce the tar content and other chemicals present in smoke, which is a result of combustion, wherein it has been found to reduce the toxicants from tobacco smoke, in particular the free radicals.

== Structure of activated carbon ==
The structure of activated carbon has long been a subject of debate. In a book published in 2006, Harry Marsh and Francisco Rodríguez-Reinoso considered more than 15 models for the structure, without coming to a definite conclusion about which was correct. Recent work using aberration-corrected transmission electron microscopy has suggested that activated carbons may have a structure related to that of the fullerenes, with pentagonal and heptagonal carbon rings.

== Production ==
Activated carbon is carbon produced from carbonaceous source materials such as bamboo, coconut husk, willow peat, wood, coir, lignite, coal, and petroleum pitch. The source material is carbonized through pyrolysis at temperatures in the range 600–900 °C (1,100–1,700 °F), usually in an inert atmosphere with gases such as argon or nitrogen. The resulting material can be activated by one of the following processes:

1. Physical activation: Carbonized material is exposed to oxidizing atmospheres (oxygen or steam) at temperatures above 250 °C (480 °F), usually in the temperature range of 600–1,200 °C (1,100–2,200 °F). The activation is performed by heating the sample for one hour in a muffle furnace at 450 °C (840 °F) in the presence of air.
2. Chemical activation: Carbonaceous material is impregnated with certain chemicals. The chemical is typically an acid, strong base, or a salt (phosphoric acid, potassium hydroxide, sodium hydroxide, potassium carbonate, sodium chloride, sodium carbonate, calcium chloride, and zinc chloride). The carbon is then subjected to high temperatures (250–800 °C (480–1,500 °F)). It is believed that the temperature activates the carbon at this stage by forcing the material to open up and have more microscopic pores. Chemical activation is preferred to physical activation owing to the lower temperatures, better quality consistency, and shorter time needed for activating the material.

The Dutch company Norit NV is one of the largest producer of activated carbon in the world. Haycarb, a Sri Lankan coconut shell-based company, controls 16% of the global market share.

=== Regeneration and sustainability ===
After adsorption, spent granular activated carbon can often be regenerated rather than discarded. Thermal reactivation (heating in an inert or steam atmosphere at 800–900 °C (1,500–1,700 °F)) restores much of the pore structure but consumes significant energy, while chemical regeneration (e.g., with dilute acids or bases) can selectively remove fouling compounds under milder conditions. Emerging methods like microwave-assisted reactivation and bio-regeneration using fungi or bacteria show promise for lower-carbon footprints. Choosing the optimal regeneration route balances carbon lifespan, energy use and treatment costs, and helps minimize the volume of hazardous waste sent to landfill.

== Classification ==
Activated carbons are complex products which are difficult to classify on the basis of their behaviour, surface characteristics and other fundamental criteria. However, some broad classification is made for general purposes based on their size, preparation methods, and industrial applications.

=== Powdered activated carbon (PAC) ===
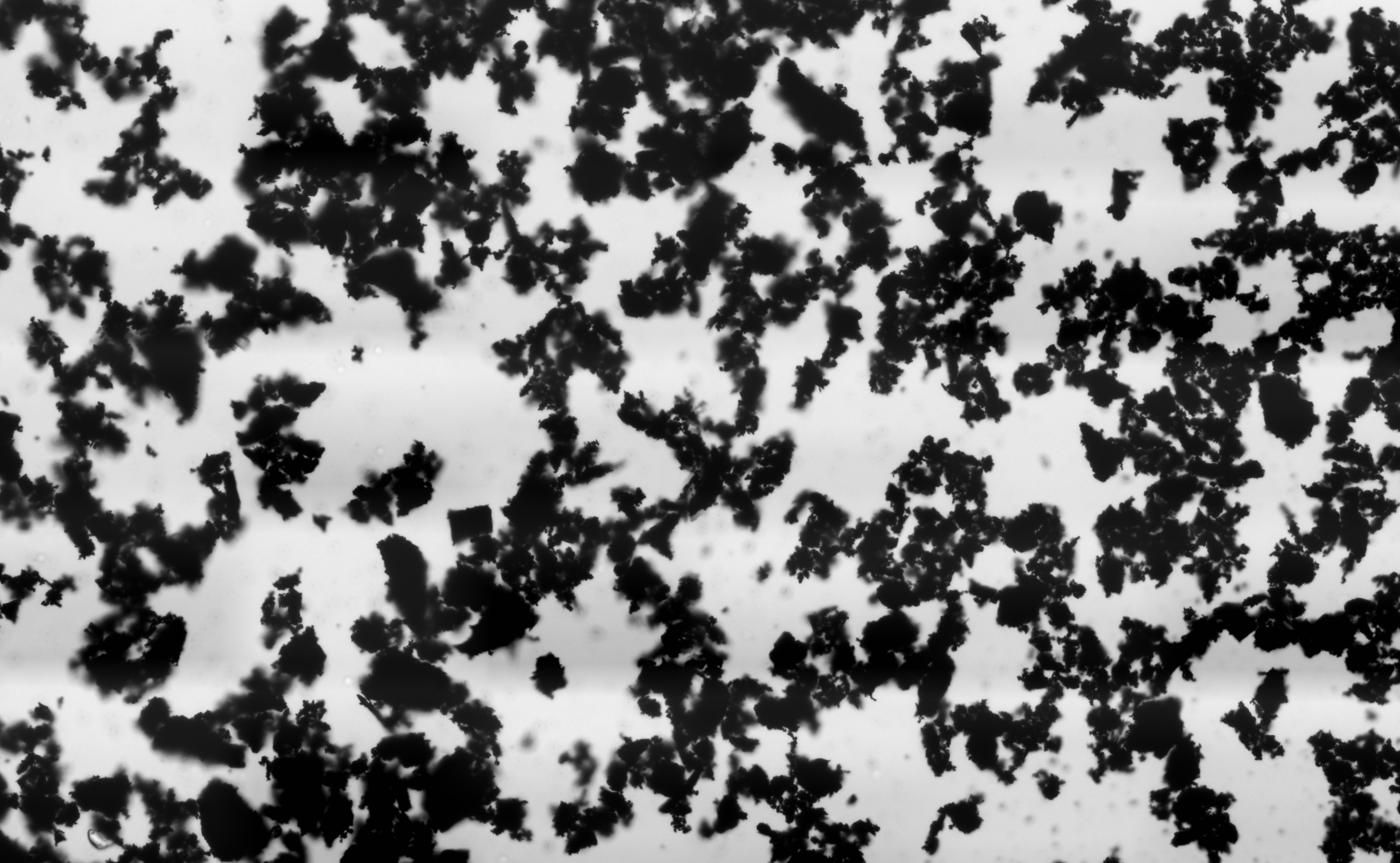
A micrograph of activated charcoal (R 1) under bright field illumination on a light microscope. Notice the fractal-like shape of the particles hinting at their enormous surface area. Each particle in this image, despite being only around 0.1 mm across, can have a surface area of several square centimetres. The entire image covers a region of approximately 1.1 by 0.7 mm, and the full resolution version is at a scale of 6.236 pixels/μm.

Normally, activated carbons (R 1) are made in particulate form as powders or fine granules less than 1.0 mm in size with an average diameter between 0.15 and 0.25 mm. Thus they present a large surface to volume ratio with a small diffusion distance. Activated carbon (R 1) is defined as the activated carbon particles retained on a 50-mesh sieve (0.297 mm).

Powdered activated carbon (PAC) material is finer material. PAC is made up of crushed or ground carbon particles, 95–100% of which will pass through a designated mesh sieve. The ASTM classifies particles passing through an 80-mesh sieve (0.177 mm) and smaller as PAC. It is not common to use PAC in a dedicated vessel, due to the high head loss that would occur. Instead, PAC is generally added directly to other process units, such as raw water intakes, rapid mix basins, clarifiers, and gravity filters.

=== Granular activated carbon (GAC) ===
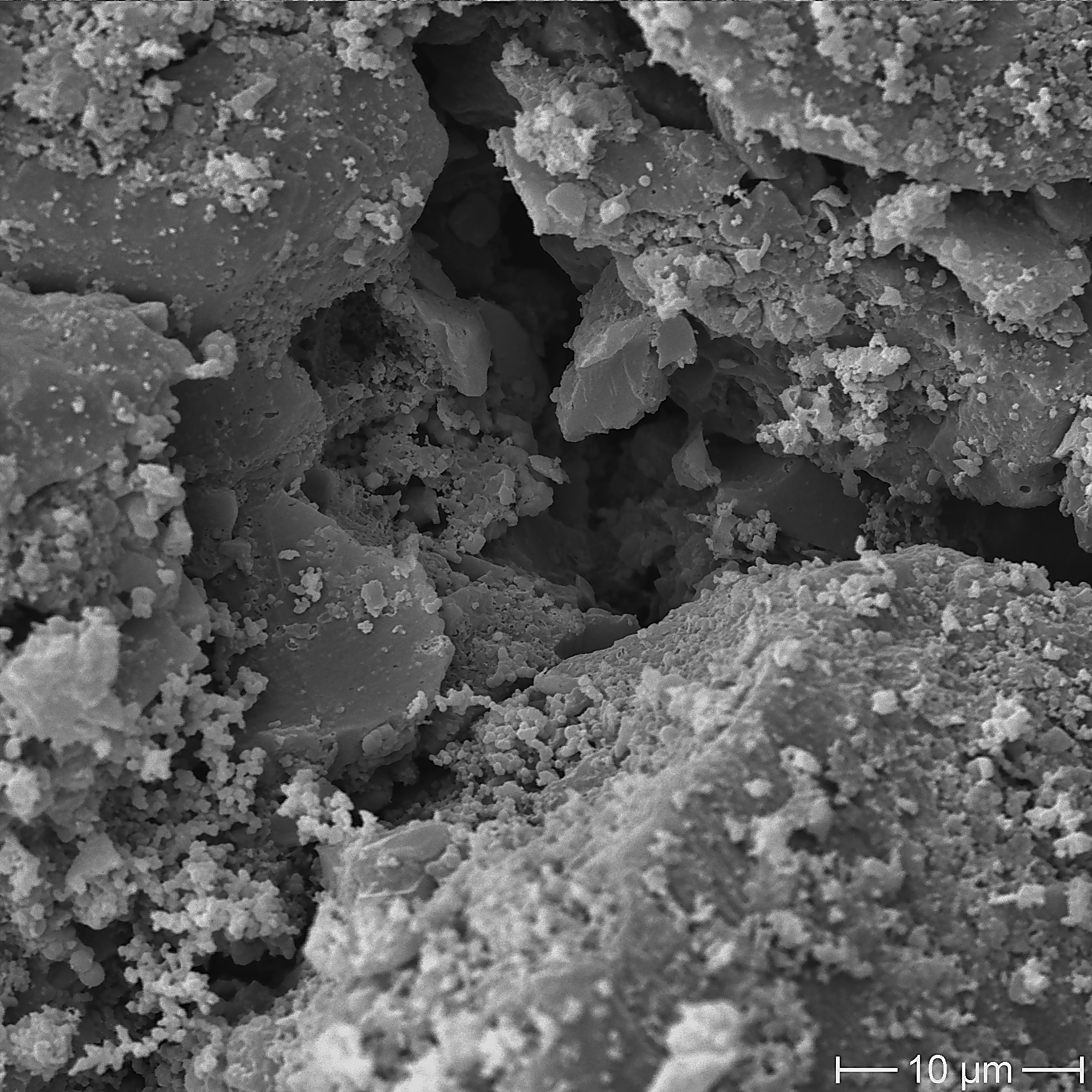
A micrograph of activated charcoal (GAC) under a scanning electron microscope

Granular activated carbon (GAC) has a relatively larger particle size compared to powdered activated carbon and consequently, presents a smaller external surface. Diffusion of the adsorbate is thus an important factor. These carbons are suitable for adsorption of gases, vapors and liquids, because these substances diffuse rapidly throughout the filters. Granulated carbons are used for air filtration and water treatment, as well as for general deodorization and separation of components in flow systems and in rapid mix basins. GAC can be obtained in either granular or extruded form. GAC is designated by sizes such as 8×20, 20×40, or 8×30 for liquid phase applications and 4×6, 4×8 or 4×10 for vapor phase applications. A 20×40 carbon is made of particles that will pass through a U.S. Standard Mesh Size No. 20 sieve (0.84 mm) (generally specified as 85% passing) but be retained on a U.S. Standard Mesh Size No. 40 sieve (0.42 mm) (generally specified as 95% retained). AWWA (1992) B604 uses the 50-mesh sieve (0.297 mm) as the minimum GAC size. The most popular aqueous-phase carbons are the 12×40 and 8×30 sizes because they have a good balance of size, surface area, and head loss characteristics.

=== Extruded activated carbon (EAC) ===
Extruded activated carbon (EAC) combines powdered activated carbon with a binder, which are fused together and extruded into a cylindrical shaped activated carbon block with diameters from 0.8 to 130 mm. These are mainly used for gas phase applications because of their low pressure drop, high mechanical strength and low dust content. Also sold as CTO filter (Chlorine, Taste, Odor).

=== Bead activated carbon (BAC) ===
Bead activated carbon (BAC) is manufactured from carbonizing petroleum pitch and then activating it into uniform spheres in diameters from approximately 0.35 to 0.80 mm. BAC typically exhibits a surface area in the range of 800–1 200 m^{2}/g, comparable to or exceeding many granular carbons, enhancing its capacity for dissolved organics. Similar to EAC, it is also noted for its low pressure drop, high mechanical strength and low dust content, but with a smaller grain size. Its spherical shape makes it preferred for fluidized bed applications such as water filtration.

=== Impregnated carbon ===
Porous carbons containing several types of inorganic impregnate such as iodine and silver. Cations such as aluminium, manganese, zinc, iron, lithium, and calcium have also been prepared for specific application in air pollution control especially in museums and galleries. Due to its antimicrobial and antiseptic properties, silver loaded activated carbon is used as an adsorbent for purification of domestic water. Drinking water can be obtained from natural water by treating the natural water with a mixture of activated carbon and aluminium hydroxide (Al(OH)_{3}), a flocculating agent. Impregnated carbons are also used for the adsorption of hydrogen sulfide (H_{2}S) and thiols. Adsorption rates for H_{2}S as high as 50% by weight have been reported.

=== Polymer coated carbon ===
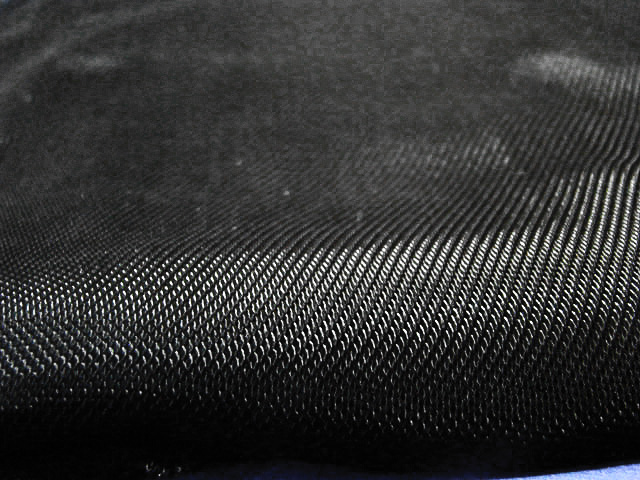
Woven activated carbon cloth

This is a process by which a porous carbon can be coated with a biocompatible polymer to give a smooth and permeable coat without blocking the pores. The typical film thickness ranges from 50 to 200 nm, which strikes a balance between preserving pore access and ensuring mechanical stability in the material. The resulting carbon is useful for hemoperfusion. Hemoperfusion is a treatment technique in which large volumes of the patient's blood are passed over an adsorbent substance in order to remove toxic substances from the blood. In clinical trials, polymer-coated carbons have achieved over 80% removal of toxins such as bilirubin and certain drug metabolites in a single pass.

=== Woven carbon ===
There is a technology of processing technical rayon fiber into activated carbon cloth for carbon filtering. Adsorption capacity of activated cloth is greater than that of activated charcoal (BET theory) surface area: 500–1500 m^{2}/g, pore volume: 0.3–0.8 cm^{3}/g). Thanks to the different forms of activated material, it can be used in a wide range of applications (supercapacitors, odor absorbers, CBRN-defense industry etc.).

== Properties ==
A gram of activated carbon can have a surface area in excess of 500 m^{2} (5,400 sq ft), with 3,000 m^{2} (32,000 sq ft) being readily achievable. Carbon aerogels, while more expensive, have even higher surface areas, and are used in special applications.

Under an electron microscope, the high surface-area structures of activated carbon are revealed. Individual particles are intensely convoluted and display various kinds of porosity; there may be many areas where flat surfaces of graphite-like material run parallel to each other, separated by only a few nanometres or so. These micropores provide superb conditions for adsorption to occur, since adsorbing material can interact with many surfaces simultaneously. Tests of adsorption behaviour are usually done with nitrogen gas at 77 K under high vacuum, but in everyday terms activated carbon is perfectly capable of producing the equivalent, by adsorption from its environment, liquid water from steam at 100 °C (212 °F) and a pressure of 1/10,000 of an atmosphere.

James Dewar, the scientist after whom the Dewar (vacuum flask) is named, spent much time in the early 20th century studying activated carbon, and published a paper regarding its adsorption capacity with regard to gases. In this paper, he discovered that cooling the carbon to liquid nitrogen temperatures allowed it to adsorb significant quantities of numerous air gases, among others, that could then be recollected by simply allowing the carbon to warm again and that coconut-based carbon was superior for the effect. He uses oxygen as an example, wherein the activated carbon would typically adsorb the atmospheric concentration (21%) under standard conditions, but release over 80% oxygen if the carbon was first cooled to low temperatures.

Physically, activated carbon binds materials by van der Waals force or London dispersion force.

Activated carbon does not bind well to certain chemicals, including alcohols, diols, strong acids and bases, metals and most inorganics, such as lithium, sodium, iron, lead, arsenic, fluorine, and boric acid.

Activated carbon can also adsorb iodine very well. The iodine capacity, mg/g, (ASTM D28 Standard Method test) may be used as an indication of total adsorption over the surface area of the testing material.

Carbon monoxide however, is not very well adsorbed by activated carbon. This should be of particular concern to those using the material in filters for respirators, fume hoods, or other gas control systems because the gas is undetectable to the human senses, toxic to the metabolism, and neurotoxic which creates concern.

Substantial lists of the common industrial and agricultural gases adsorbed by activated carbon can be found online.

Activated carbon can be used as a substrate for the application of various chemicals to improve the adsorptive capacity for some inorganic (and problematic organic) compounds such as hydrogen sulfide (H_{2}S), ammonia (NH_{3}), formaldehyde (HCOH), mercury (Hg) and radioactive iodine-131(^{131}I). This property is known as chemisorption.

=== Iodine number ===
Many carbons preferentially adsorb small molecules. Iodine number is the most fundamental parameter used to characterize activated carbon performance. It is a measure of activity level (higher number indicates higher degree of activation) often reported in mg/g (typical range 500–1200 mg/g). It is a measure of the micropore content of the activated carbon (0 to 20 Å, or up to 2 nm) by adsorption of iodine from solution. It is equivalent to surface area of carbon between 900 and 1100 m^{2}/g. It is the standard measure for liquid-phase applications.

Iodine number is defined as the milligrams of iodine adsorbed by one gram of carbon when the iodine concentration in the residual filtrate is at a concentration of 0.02 normal (i.e. 0.02N). Basically, iodine number is a measure of the iodine adsorbed in the pores and, as such, is an indication of the pore volume available in the activated carbon of interest. Typically, water-treatment carbons have iodine numbers ranging from 600 to 1100. Frequently, this parameter is used to determine the degree of exhaustion of a carbon in use. However, this practice should be viewed with caution, as chemical interactions with the adsorbate may affect the iodine uptake, giving false results. Thus, the use of iodine number as a measure of the degree of exhaustion of a carbon bed can only be recommended if it has been shown to be free of chemical interactions with adsorbates and if an experimental correlation between iodine number and the degree of exhaustion has been determined for the particular application.

=== Molasses ===
Some carbons are more adept at adsorbing large molecules. Molasses number or molasses efficiency is a measure of the mesopore content of the activated carbon (greater than 20 Å, or larger than 2 nm) by adsorption of molasses from solution. A high molasses number indicates a high adsorption of big molecules (range 95–600). Caramel dp (decolorizing performance) is similar to molasses number. Molasses efficiency is reported as a percentage (range 40%–185%) and parallels molasses number (600 = 185%, 425 = 85%). The European molasses number (range 525–110) is inversely related to the North American molasses number.

Molasses Number is a measure of the degree of decolorization of a standard molasses solution that has been diluted and standardized against standardized activated carbon. Due to the size of color bodies, the molasses number represents the potential pore volume available for larger adsorbing species. As all of the pore volume may not be available for adsorption in a particular waste water application, and as some of the adsorbate may enter smaller pores, it is not a good measure of the worth of a particular activated carbon for a specific application. Frequently, this parameter is useful in evaluating a series of active carbons for their rates of adsorption. Given two active carbons with similar pore volumes for adsorption, the one having the higher molasses number will usually have larger feeder pores resulting in more efficient transfer of adsorbate into the adsorption space.

=== Tannin ===
Tannins are a mixture of large and medium size molecules. Carbons with a combination of macropores and mesopores adsorb tannins. The ability of a carbon to adsorb tannins is reported in parts per million concentration (range 200 ppm–362 ppm).

=== Methylene blue ===
Some carbons have a mesopore (20 Å to 50 Å, or 2 to 5 nm) structure which adsorbs medium size molecules, such as the dye methylene blue. Methylene blue adsorption is reported in g/100g (range 11–28 g/100g).

=== Dechlorination ===
Some carbons are evaluated based on the dechlorination half-life length, which measures the chlorine-removal efficiency of activated carbon. The dechlorination half-value length is the depth of carbon required to reduce the chlorine concentration by 50%. A lower half-value length indicates superior performance.

=== Apparent density ===
The solid or skeletal density of activated carbons will typically range between 2000 and 2100 kg/m^{3} (125–130 lbs./cubic foot). However, a large part of an activated carbon sample will consist of air space between particles, and the actual or apparent density will therefore be lower, typically 400 to 500 kg/m^{3} (25–31 lbs./cubic foot).

Higher density provides greater volume activity and normally indicates better-quality activated carbon. ASTM D 2854 -09 (2014) is used to determine the apparent density of activated carbon.

=== Hardness/abrasion number ===
It is a measure of the activated carbon's resistance to attrition. It is an important indicator of activated carbon to maintain its physical integrity and withstand frictional forces which would cause the material to be defective. There are large differences in the hardness of activated carbons, depending on the raw material and activity levels (porosity) it is created for.

=== Ash content ===
Ash reduces the overall activity of activated carbon and reduces the efficiency of reactivation. The amount is exclusively dependent on the base raw material used to produce the activated carbon (e.g., coconut, wood, coal, etc.). The metal oxides (Fe_{2}O_{3}) can leach out of activated carbon resulting in discoloration. Acid/water-soluble ash content is more significant than total ash content. Soluble ash content can be very important for aquarists, as ferric oxide can promote algal growths. A carbon with a low soluble ash content should be used for marine, freshwater fish and reef tanks to avoid heavy metal poisoning and excess plant/algal growth. ASTM (D2866 Standard Method test) is used to determine the ash content of activated carbon.

=== Carbon tetrachloride activity ===
Measurement of the porosity of an activated carbon by the adsorption of saturated carbon tetrachloride vapour.

=== Particle size distribution ===
The finer the particle size of an activated carbon, the better the access to the surface area and the faster the rate of adsorption kinetics. In vapour phase systems this needs to be considered against pressure drop, which will affect energy cost. Careful consideration of particle size distribution can provide significant operating benefits. However, in the case of using activated carbon for adsorption of minerals such as gold, the particle size should be in the range of 3.35–1.4 millimetres (0.132–0.055 in). Activated carbon with particle size less than 1 mm would not be suitable for elution (the stripping of mineral from an activated carbon). Researchers at Cornell University synthesized an ultrahigh surface area activated carbon with a BET area of 4800 m2 g–1 and a total pore volume of 2.7 cm3 g–1. This BET area value is the highest reported in the literature for activated carbon to date.

== Modification of properties and reactivity ==
Acid-base, oxidation-reduction and specific adsorption characteristics are strongly dependent on the composition of the surface functional groups.

The surface of conventional activated carbon is reactive, capable of oxidation by atmospheric oxygen and oxygen plasma steam, and also carbon dioxide and ozone.

Oxidation in the liquid phase is caused by a wide range of reagents (HNO_{3}, H_{2}O_{2}, KMnO_{4}).

Through the formation of a large number of basic and acidic groups on the surface of oxidized carbon to sorption and other properties can differ significantly from the unmodified forms.

Activated carbon can be nitrogenated by natural products or polymers or processing of carbon with nitrogenating reagents.

Activated carbon can interact with chlorine, bromine and fluorine.

Surface of activated carbon, like other carbon materials can be fluoralkylated by treatment with (per)fluoropolyether peroxide in a liquid phase, or with wide range of fluoroorganic substances by CVD-method. Such materials combine high hydrophobicity and chemical stability with electrical and thermal conductivity and can be used as electrode material for super capacitors.

Sulfonic acid functional groups can be attached to activated carbon to give "starbons" which can be used to selectively catalyse the esterification of fatty acids. Formation of such activated carbons from halogenated precursors gives a more effective catalyst which is thought to be a result of remaining halogens improving stability. It is reported about synthesis of activated carbon with chemically grafted superacid sites –CF_{2}SO_{3}H.

Some of the chemical properties of activated carbon have been attributed to presence of the surface active carbon double bond.

The Polyani adsorption theory is a popular method for analyzing adsorption of various organic substances to their surface.

== Examples of adsorption ==
=== Heterogeneous catalysis ===
The most commonly encountered form of chemisorption in industry, occurs when a solid catalyst interacts with a gaseous feedstock, the reactant/s. The adsorption of reactant/s to the catalyst surface creates a chemical bond, altering the electron density around the reactant molecule and allowing it to undergo reactions that would not normally be available to it.

== Reactivation and regeneration ==
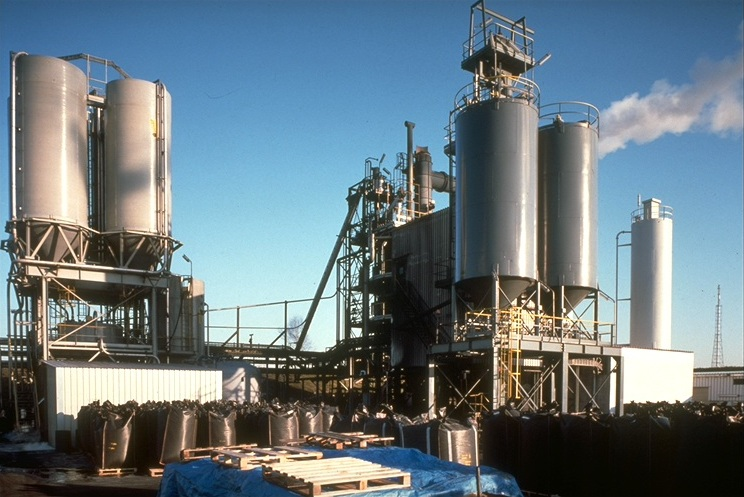
World's largest reactivation plant located in Feluy, Belgium

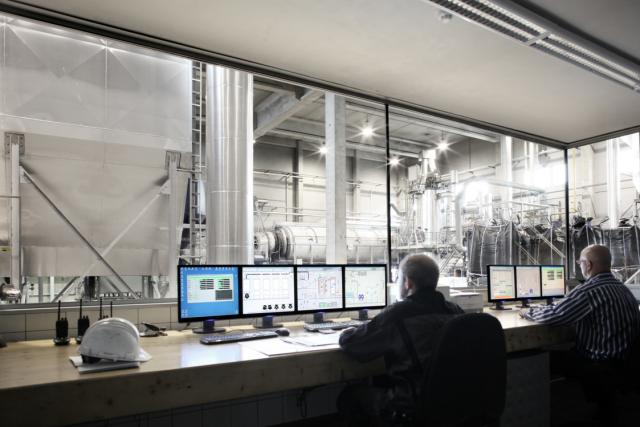
Activated carbon reactivation center in Roeselare, Belgium

The reactivation or the regeneration of activated carbons involves restoring the adsorptive capacity of saturated activated carbon by desorbing adsorbed contaminants on the activated carbon surface.

=== Thermal reactivation ===
The most common regeneration technique employed in industrial processes is thermal reactivation. The thermal regeneration process generally follows three steps:

- Adsorbent drying at approximately 105 °C (221 °F)
- High temperature desorption and decomposition (500–900 °C (932–1,652 °F)) under an inert atmosphere
- Residual organic gasification by a non-oxidising gas (steam or carbon dioxide) at elevated temperatures (800 °C (1,470 °F))

The heat treatment stage utilises the exothermic nature of adsorption and results in desorption, partial cracking and polymerization of the adsorbed organics. The final step aims to remove charred organic residue formed in the porous structure in the previous stage and re-expose the porous carbon structure regenerating its original surface characteristics. After treatment the adsorption column can be reused. Per adsorption-thermal regeneration cycle between 5–15 wt% of the carbon bed is burnt off resulting in a loss of adsorptive capacity. Thermal regeneration is a high energy process due to the high required temperatures making it both an energetically and commercially expensive process. Plants that rely on thermal regeneration of activated carbon have to be of a certain size before it is economically viable to have regeneration facilities onsite. As a result, it is common for smaller waste treatment sites to ship their activated carbon cores to specialised facilities for regeneration.

=== Other regeneration techniques ===
Current concerns with the high energy/cost nature of thermal regeneration of activated carbon has encouraged research into alternative regeneration methods to reduce the environmental impact of such processes. Though several of the regeneration techniques cited have remained areas of purely academic research, some alternatives to thermal regeneration systems have been employed in industry. Current alternative regeneration methods are:

- TSA (thermal swing adsorption) and/or PSA (pressure swing adsorption) processes: through convection (heat transfer) using steam, "hot" inert gas (typically heated nitrogen (150–250 °C (302–482 °F))), or vacuum (T+VSA or TVSA, combining TSA and VSA processes) in situ regeneration
- MWR (microwave regeneration)
- Chemical and solvent regeneration
- Chemical and thermal regeneration
- Microbial regeneration
- Electrochemical regeneration
- Ultrasonic regeneration
- Wet air oxidation

== See also ==
- Activated charcoal cleanse
- Biochar
- Bamboo charcoal
- Binchōtan
- Bone char
- Carbon filtering
- Carbocatalysis
- Conjugated microporous polymer
- Hydrogen storage
- Kværner process
- Onboard refueling vapor recovery
