= Fullerene whiskers =

Microscopic molecular structures

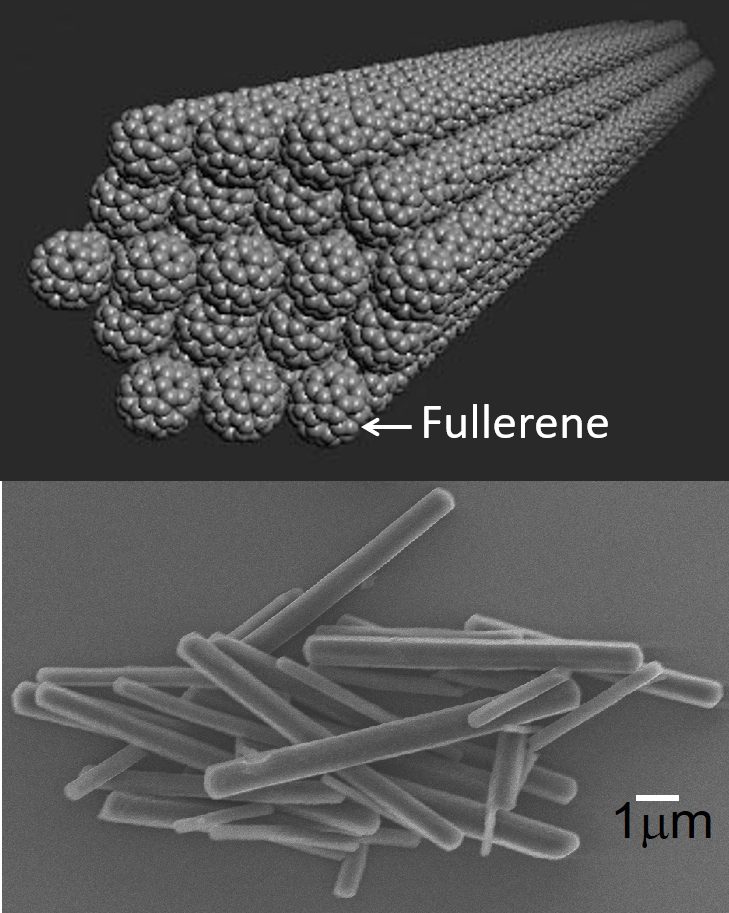
Schematic (top) and electron micrograph (bottom) of C_{60} whiskers

Fullerene whiskers are thin rods composed of fullerene molecules, such as C_{60}, C_{70}, or their mixtures. Hollow fullerene whiskers are called fullerene tubes. Such structures typically have a diameter of a few micrometers. When the diameter becomes smaller than 1 micron, the corresponding structures are called fullerene nanowhiskers or fullerene nanotubes.

Fullerene whiskers and tubes are held together by weak van der Waals forces, and hence are very soft. They can be grown by precipitation at an interface between two liquids. They are semiconductors and have potential uses in field-effect transistors, solar cells, chemical sensors, and photocatalysts. When doped with alkali metals, such as potassium, they become superconductors at 18 K (−255.2 °C; −427.3 °F).

As-grown fullerene nanotubes have hexagonal shapes and face-centered cubic crystal structures. Owing to their relatively large inner diameters (approx. 100 nm) and low reactivity they can accommodate a wide range of nanoparticles. C_{60} nanotubes decompose upon heating to 416 °C (781 °F) in air.
