= Solubility of fullerenes =

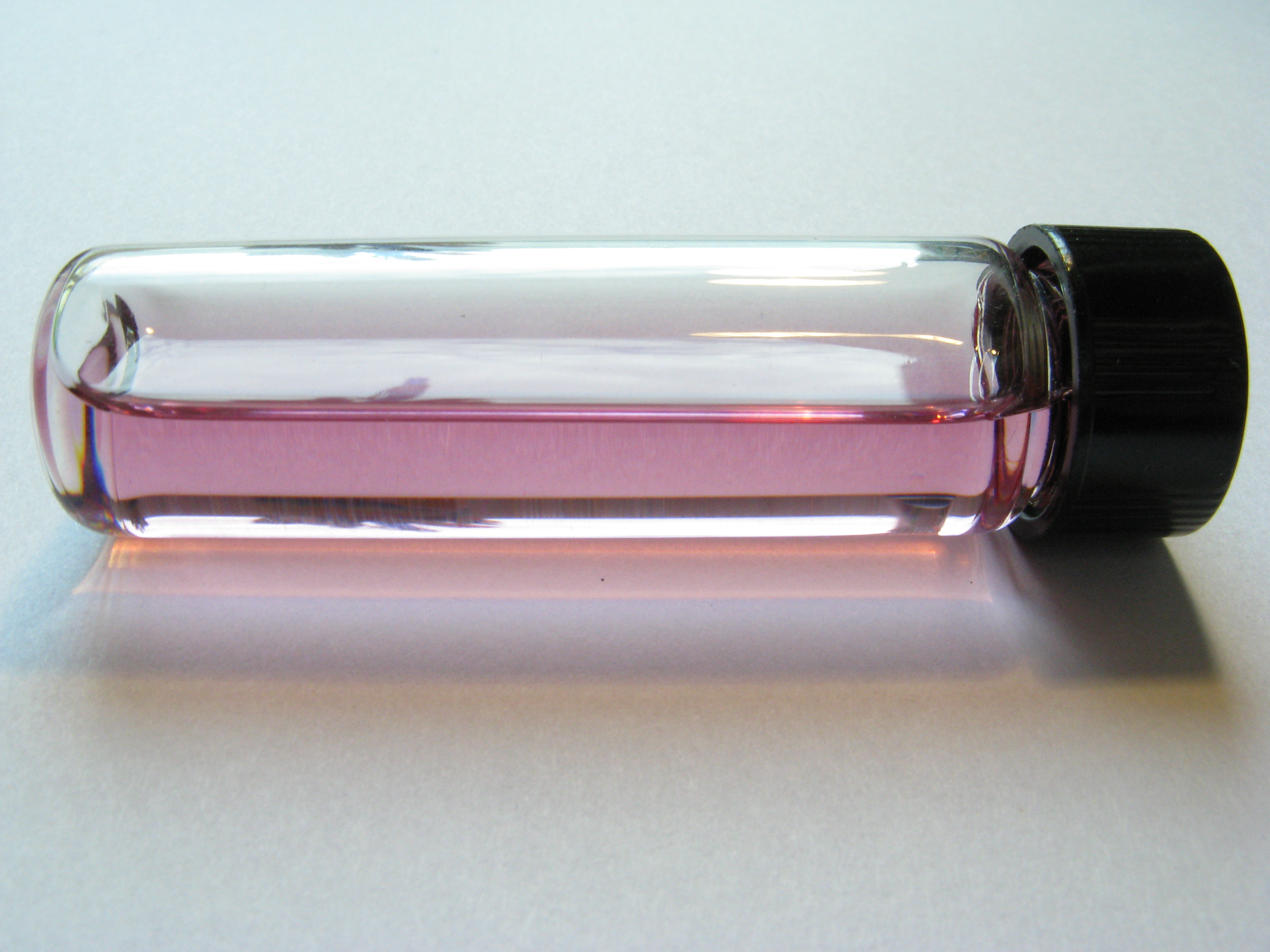
C_{60} in solution

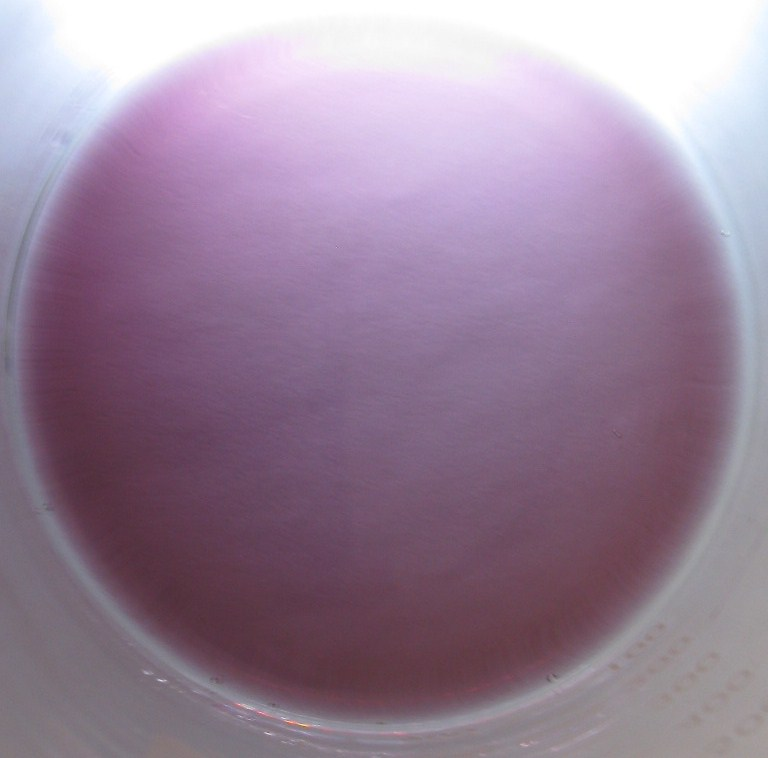
C_{60} in extra virgin olive oil showing the characteristic purple color of pristine C_{60} solutions

The solubility of fullerenes is generally low. Carbon disulfide dissolves 8g/L of C60, and the best solvent (1-chloronaphthalene) dissolves 53 g/L. up Still, fullerenes are the only known allotrope of carbon that can be dissolved in common solvents at room temperature. Besides those two, good solvents for fullerenes include 1,2-dichlorobenzene, toluene, p-xylene, and 1,2,3-tribromopropane. Fullerenes are highly insoluble in water, and practically insoluble in methanol.

Solutions of pure C_{60} (buckminsterfullerene) have a deep purple color. Solutions of C_{70} are reddish brown. Larger fullerenes C_{76} to C_{84} have a variety of colors. C_{76} has two optical forms, while other larger fullerenes have several structural isomers.

== General considerations ==
Some fullerene structures are not soluble because they have a small band gap between the ground and excited states. These include the small fullerenes C_{28}, C_{36} and C_{50}. The C_{72} structure is also in this class, but the endohedral version with a trapped lanthanide-group atom is soluble due to the interaction of the metal atom and the electronic states of the fullerene. Researchers had originally been puzzled by C_{72} being absent in fullerene plasma-generated soot extract, but found in endohedral samples. Small band gap fullerenes are highly reactive and bind to other fullerenes or to soot particles.

Solubility of C_{60} in some solvents shows unusual behaviour due to existence of solvate phases (analogues of crystallohydrates). For example, solubility of C_{60} in benzene solution shows maximum at about 313 K. Crystallization from benzene solution at temperatures below maximum results in formation of triclinic solid solvate with four benzene molecules C_{60}·4C_{6}H_{6} which is rather unstable in air. Out of solution, this structure decomposes into usual face-centered cubic (fcc) C_{60} in few minutes' time. At temperatures above solubility maximum the solvate is not stable even when immersed in saturated solution and melts with formation of fcc C_{60}. Crystallization at temperatures above the solubility maximum results in formation of pure fcc C_{60}. Millimeter-sized crystals of C_{60} and C_{70} can be grown from solution both for solvates and for pure fullerenes.

== Solubility table ==
The following are some solubility values for C_{60} and C_{70} from the literature, in grams per liter.

Solvent	C_{60}	C_{70}
1-chloronaphthalene	51	ND
1-methylnaphthalene	33	ND
1,2-dichlorobenzene	24	36.2
1,2,4-trimethylbenzene	18	ND
tetrahydronaphthalene	16	ND
carbon disulfide	8	9.875
1,2,3-tribromopropane	8	ND
chlorobenzene	7	ND
p-xylene	5	3.985
bromoform	5	ND
cumene	4	ND
toluene	3	1.406
benzene	1.5	1.3
carbon tetrachloride	0.447	0.121
chloroform	0.25	ND
n-hexane	0.046	0.013
cyclohexane	0.035	0.08
tetrahydrofuran	0.006	ND
acetonitrile	0.004	ND
methanol	4.0×10^{−5}	ND
water	1.3×10^{−11}	ND
pentane	0.004	0.002
heptane	ND	0.047
octane	0.025	0.042
isooctane	0.026	ND
decane	0.070	0.053
dodecane	0.091	0.098
tetradecane	0.126	ND
acetone	ND	0.0019
isopropanol	ND	0.0021
dioxane	0.0041	ND
mesitylene	0.997	1.472
dichloromethane	0.254	0.080
ND = not determined

== See also ==
- Fullerene chemistry
