= List of isomers of decane =

This is the list of the 75 isomers of decane.

== Straight-chain ==
- Decane

== Nonane ==
- 2-Methylnonane
- 3-Methylnonane
- 4-Methylnonane
- 5-Methylnonane

== Octane ==
=== Ethyl ===
- 3-Ethyloctane
- 4-Ethyloctane

=== Dimethyl ===
- 2,2-Dimethyloctane
- 2,3-Dimethyloctane
- 2,4-Dimethyloctane
- 2,5-Dimethyloctane
- 2,6-Dimethyloctane
- 2,7-Dimethyloctane
- 3,3-Dimethyloctane
- 3,4-Dimethyloctane
- 3,5-Dimethyloctane
- 3,6-Dimethyloctane
- 4,4-Dimethyloctane
- 4,5-Dimethyloctane

== Heptane ==
=== Propyl ===
- 4-Propylheptane
- 4-(1-Methylethyl)heptane or 4-Isopropylheptane

=== Ethyl+Methyl ===
- 3-Ethyl-2-methylheptane
- 3-Ethyl-3-methylheptane
- 3-Ethyl-4-methylheptane
- 3-Ethyl-5-methylheptane
- 4-Ethyl-2-methylheptane
- 4-Ethyl-3-methylheptane
- 4-Ethyl-4-methylheptane
- 5-Ethyl-2-methylheptane

=== Trimethyl ===
- 2,2,3-Trimethylheptane
- 2,2,4-Trimethylheptane
- 2,2,5-Trimethylheptane
- 2,2,6-Trimethylheptane
- 2,3,3-Trimethylheptane
- 2,3,4-Trimethylheptane
- 2,3,5-Trimethylheptane
- 2,3,6-Trimethylheptane
- 2,4,4-Trimethylheptane
- 2,4,5-Trimethylheptane
- 2,4,6-Trimethylheptane
- 2,5,5-Trimethylheptane
- 3,3,4-Trimethylheptane
- 3,3,5-Trimethylheptane
- 3,4,4-Trimethylheptane
- 3,4,5-Trimethylheptane

== Hexane ==
=== Methyl+Propyl ===
- 2-Methyl-3-(1-methylethyl)hexane or 3-Isopropyl-2-methylhexane

=== Diethyl ===
- 3,3-Diethylhexane
- 3,4-Diethylhexane

=== Ethyl+Dimethyl ===
- 3-Ethyl-2,2-dimethylhexane
- 3-Ethyl-2,3-dimethylhexane
- 3-Ethyl-2,4-dimethylhexane
- 3-Ethyl-2,5-dimethylhexane
- 3-Ethyl-3,4-dimethylhexane
- 4-Ethyl-2,2-dimethylhexane
- 4-Ethyl-2,3-dimethylhexane
- 4-Ethyl-2,4-dimethylhexane
- 4-Ethyl-3,3-dimethylhexane

=== Tetramethyl ===
- 2,2,3,3-Tetramethylhexane
- 2,2,3,4-Tetramethylhexane
- 2,2,3,5-Tetramethylhexane
- 2,2,4,4-Tetramethylhexane
- 2,2,4,5-Tetramethylhexane
- 2,2,5,5-Tetramethylhexane
- 2,3,3,4-Tetramethylhexane
- 2,3,3,5-Tetramethylhexane
- 2,3,4,4-Tetramethylhexane
- 2,3,4,5-Tetramethylhexane
- 3,3,4,4-Tetramethylhexane

== Pentane ==
=== Dimethyl+Propyl ===
- 2,4-Dimethyl-3-(1-methylethyl)pentane or 3-Isopropyl-2,4-dimethylpentane

=== Diethyl+Methyl ===
- 3,3-Diethyl-2-methylpentane

=== Ethyl+Trimethyl ===
- 3-Ethyl-2,2,3-trimethylpentane
- 3-Ethyl-2,2,4-trimethylpentane
- 3-Ethyl-2,3,4-trimethylpentane

=== Pentamethyl ===
- 2,2,3,3,4-Pentamethylpentane
- 2,2,3,4,4-Pentamethylpentane
