= Polymer-fullerene bulk heterojunction solar cell =

Type of organic solar cell

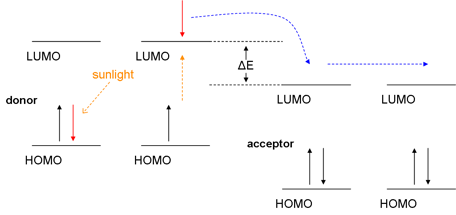
When electrons of donor molecules are photoexcited, they jump from the HOMO to LUMO energy level. The electrons now in the LUMO energy level can travel to nearby acceptor molecules, which are more electronegative and thus lower in energy. The driving force for the electron transfer between donor and acceptor is the difference in LUMO energy levels.

Polymer-fullerene bulk heterojunction solar cells are a type of organic solar cell that generate electricity using a blend of a conductive polymer and a fullerene derivative. These cells are a specific architecture within the field of organic photovoltaics (OPV). Unlike traditional rigid solar panels made of crystalline silicon, polymer-fullerene cells use carbon-based materials that can be processed from solution, allowing them to be manufactured using low-cost techniques like inkjet printing or roll-to-roll processing on flexible substrates.

This approach was and instructive step in the evolution of organic solar cells, but the use of fullerenes as electron acceptor component has been largely abandoned. This technology has been displaced by related non-fullerene devices.

== Background ==
The operation of polymer-fullerene solar cells is governed by the specific nature of organic semiconductors. Unlike inorganic materials (like silicon) where light creates free electrons immediately, organic materials absorb light to create excitons - strongly bound electron-hole pairs that do not conduct current on their own.

=== The exciton diffusion bottleneck ===
To generate electricity, the exciton must be split into a separate electron and hole. This separation occurs only at the interface between the donor (polymer) and the acceptor (fullerene). However, excitons in organic polymers have a very short lifespan and can only diffuse a short distance—typically 10–20 nanometers—before they decay and the energy is lost.

In a simple "bilayer" device (where the polymer and fullerene are stacked in two flat layers), only the excitons created within ~10 nm of the center interface can be harvested. Excitons created further away die before reaching the junction, resulting in very low efficiency.

=== The bulk heterojunction solution ===
The bulk heterojunction (BHJ) solves this problem by mechanically mixing the donor and acceptor materials together in a solution before casting them onto the substrate. This creates a nanoscale interpenetrating polymer network where the two materials are blended throughout the film.

In this structure, no point in the polymer is more than a few nanometers away from a fullerene molecule. This ensures that nearly all excitons generated by sunlight can reach an interface, dissociate into charge carriers, and travel through the continuous material pathways to the electrodes.

=== Charge generation steps ===
The conversion of light to electricity proceeds in four steps:

1. Absorption: The polymer absorbs a photon and forms an exciton.
2. Diffusion: The exciton diffuses to the interface between the polymer and the fullerene.
3. Dissociation: The difference in molecular orbital energy levels (specifically the HOMO/LUMO offset) drives the electron to jump from the polymer to the fullerene, splitting the exciton.
4. Transport and Collection: The hole travels through the polymer to the anode, while the electron travels through the fullerene to the cathode.

== Structure ==
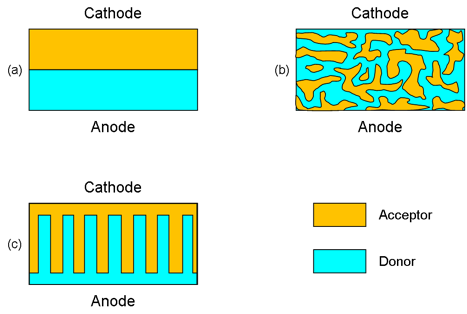
Three different schematic representations of blending electron donor and acceptor materials. (a) Bilayer representation, with efficient charge generation but poor charge transport.[10] (b) Solution processed representation, in which rapid drying leads to a randomized network of acceptor/donor blending, currently the most optimal way to blend. (c) Theoretical, ideal representation of acceptor/donor blending.

Materials used in polymer-based photovoltaic cells are characterized by their total electron affinities and absorption power. The electron-rich, donor materials tend to be conjugated polymers with relatively high absorption power, whereas the acceptor in this case is a highly symmetric fullerene molecule with a strong affinity for electrons, ensuring sufficient electron mobility between the two.

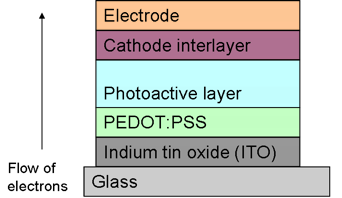
The typical structural layout of photovoltaic devices. Transparent, conductive ITO is applied onto glass, and a hole transport layer of PEDOT:PSS (poly(3,4-ethylenedioxythiophene)poly(styrenesulfonate)) on top of that. The photoactive layer is a blend of electron acceptor and donor atoms, and the cathode interlayer is a low work function metal used to lower the work function of the electrode on top to accept electrons.

The arrangement of materials essentially determines the overall efficiency of the heterojunction solar cell. There are three donor-acceptor bulk morphologies: (a) the bilayer, (b) the bulk heterojunction, and (c) the "comb" structure. Typically, a polymer-fullerene bulk heterojunction solar cell has a layered structure.

== Device Architecture ==
For Fullerene-based OPV, there are two device architectures in use today: traditional (conventional) and inverted. The BHJ conventional architecture has set a significant milestone in terms of improving efficiencies in OPVs in order to commercialize them. However, due to oxygen and moisture intrusion into the electrodes, as well as damage caused by air or oxidation of the electrodes, the environmental stability of these OPVs remains the most difficult challenge to overcome. To overcome this challenge researchers had established inverted device architecture for BHJ PSCs. In an inverted device, the bottom transparent electrode serves as the cathode while the top electrode is an anode. The inverted devices exhibited higher environmental stability, and higher efficiencies in most cases in comparison with the conventional architecture of OPVs, which is achieved by using high work function metal or metal oxides as a cathode and the low work function metal as an anode. In the normal architecture the low work function cathode would easily get oxidized in the air by oxygen and moisture, thus using a higher work function cathode minimizes this tendency and improves efficiency and stability.

== Advantages and Applications ==
Polymer-fullerene cells differ fundamentally from inorganic devices (like silicon) in their mechanical properties and processing methods, leading to distinct advantages and use cases.

=== Manufacturing advantages ===
The primary appeal of polymer-fullerene technology lies in its potential for low-cost manufacturing:

- Solution processing: Because the organic materials can be dissolved in common solvents, the active layer can be deposited using wet-coating techniques such as spin coating, doctor blading, and inkjet printing.
- Roll-to-roll production: The solubility allows for large-scale, continuous manufacturing on flexible rolls (similar to printing a newspaper). This consumes significantly less energy than the high-temperature vacuum deposition required for crystalline silicon cells.

=== Device properties ===
- Flexibility and weight: The ability to use plastic substrates (such as PET) instead of heavy glass makes these cells lightweight and flexible. This allows them to be applied to curved surfaces or integrated into clothing and portable electronics.
- Tunable absorption: The chemical structure of the polymer can be modified to absorb specific wavelengths of light. This allows for the creation of semi-transparent cells that can be used as solar windows or skylights.

=== Niche applications ===
Due to their lower absolute efficiency and stability issues compared to rigid silicon, polymer-fullerene cells have primarily been targeted at markets where flexibility is more important than raw power output:

- Indoor light harvesting: Organic cells often retain high efficiency under low-light or artificial lighting conditions (where silicon performance drops), making them suitable for powering Internet of Things (IoT) sensors and RFID tags.
- Building-integrated photovoltaics (BIPV): Their potential for semi-transparency and color tuning makes them attractive for architectural integration where aesthetics are a priority.

== Challenges to commercialization ==
While polymer-fullerene bulk heterojunction (BHJ) devices have been used in niche commercial applications - such as portable electronics and indoor light harvesting - widespread mass-market adoption remains limited. To compete with silicon or newer non-fullerene organic cells, these devices must overcome significant hurdles regarding efficiency and long-term stability.

=== Efficiency limitations ===
A primary limitation in these devices is the low charge carrier mobility inherent to many conjugated polymers. Unlike crystalline silicon, where charges move freely, organic materials often suffer from charge recombination before the carriers can reach the electrodes. Additionally, the exciton diffusion length in these polymers is typically very short (often less than 20 nm). This requires the donor and acceptor materials to be mixed on a nanometer scale so that excitons can reach an interface to dissociate before they decay. If the morphology of the blend is not optimized, or if the active layer is too thick, charges are lost, resulting in lower power conversion efficiency.

Mismatches in energy levels (HOMO/LUMO) between the active layer and the electrodes can also prevent the formation of Ohmic contacts, further hindering the collection of electrical current.

=== Stability and degradation ===
Environmental stability is currently the most critical challenge for the technology. Organic solar cells degrade rapidly when exposed to standard environmental conditions. This degradation is driven by several concurrent factors:

- Chemical degradation: Oxygen and water vapor from the atmosphere can penetrate the device, leading to the oxidation of the electrode materials (particularly low-work function metals like aluminum or calcium) and the photo-oxidation of the organic polymer itself.
- Morphological instability: Over time, the carefully blended nanostructure of the donor and acceptor can shift (phase separation), reducing the surface area available for charge separation.
- Mechanical and thermal stress: Heating during operation or physical bending (in flexible devices) can cause delamination of layers or microscopic cracks that interrupt charge transport.
