= Triumphene =

Triumphene is a fluorinated and phenylated fullerene derivative. It was first synthesized in 1998 by Boltalina, Street, and Taylor by reaction of C_{60}F_{18} in a benzene-FeCl_{3} solution for two weeks at room temperature. It is the first trefoil-shaped phenylated [60]fullerene, providing a unique scaffold for the potential use in nanoscale imaging agents.
