= Spherical aromaticity =

Term used in organic chemistry

In organic chemistry, spherical aromaticity is formally used to describe an unusually stable nature of some spherical compounds such as fullerenes and polyhedral boranes.

In 2000, Andreas Hirsch and coworkers in Erlangen, Germany, formulated a rule to determine when a spherical compound would be aromatic. They found that those with 2(n+1)^{2} π-electrons could display aromatic properties, as spherical molecular orbitals are filled when there are 2(n+1)^{2} π-electrons for some positive integer n. For example, in buckminsterfullerene (C_{60}) this happens for the species C_{60}^{10+}, which has 50 π-electrons: 50/2 = 25, which is a perfect square.

In 2011, Jordi Poater and Miquel Solà expanded Hirsch's rule to open-shell spherical compounds, which have unfilled outer shells but are still aromatic. They found that spherical compounds with 2n^{2}+2n+1 π-electrons with spin S = (n + 1/2) would also display aromatic properties, sometimes more aromatic than comparable closed-shell species. This corresponds to the outer shell being half-filled, and is similar to Baird's rule. For example buckminsterfullerene with one additional electron, (C_{60}^{1–}) is aromatic, with S = 11/2 and a bond-length alternation of 0.2 pm.

== See also ==
- Fullerene chemistry
- Carborane
- Boranes
