= 2-Methylnonane =

Organic chemical compound

Names
- Preferred IUPAC name 2-Methylnonane

Identifiers
CAS Number	871-83-0
3D model (JSmol)	Interactive image
ChemSpider	12807
ECHA InfoCard	100.011.649
EC Number	212-814-5
PubChem CID	13379
UNII	382AKH052V
CompTox Dashboard (EPA)	DTXSID80873239
- InChI: InChI=1S/C10H22/c1-4-5-6-7-8-9-10(2)3/h10H,4-9H2,1-3H3 Key: SGVYKUFIHHTIFL-UHFFFAOYSA-N
- SMILES: CCCCCCCC(C)C

Properties
Chemical formula	C_{10}H_{22}
Molar mass	142.286 g·mol^{−1}
Density	0.7490 at 20 °C
Melting point	−74.6 °C (−102.3 °F; 198.6 K)
Boiling point	166.9 °C (332.4 °F; 440.0 K)

Hazards
- GHS labelling
Pictograms	(GHS02: Flammable) (GHS08: Health hazard)
Signal word	Danger
Hazard statements	H225, H304
Precautionary statements	P210, P233, P240, P241, P242, P243, P280, P301+P316, P303+P361+P353, P331, P370+P378, P403+P235, P405, P501

Related compounds
Related compounds	n-Decane; 3-Methylnonane; 4-Methylnonane; 5-Methylnonane
- Except where otherwise noted, data are given for materials in their standard state (at 25 °C [77 °F], 100 kPa). Infobox references

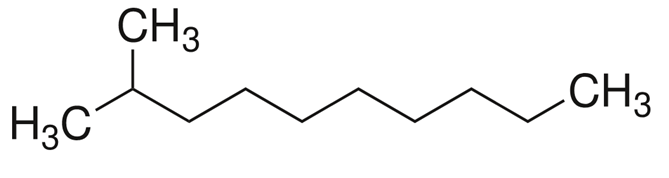
the chemical structure shows it is a branched-chain alkane with the molecular formula C_{10}H_{22}. Its consists of a nine-carbon straight chain (nonane) with a methyl group (-CH_{3}) attached to the second carbon atom.

2-Methylnonane (or isodecane) makes a significant portion of fuels like petrol as a fuel additive, making it essential for energy production. It is useful for various applications in organic chemistry as it easily dissolves in non-polar solvents such as hexane and benzene.

Its physical state is liquid and appears colorless. It smells of petroleum distillates. May be fatal if swallowed and enters airways. It is a category 3 flammable liquid and has a category 1 aspiration toxicity. 2-Methylnonane is insoluble and floats on water and evaporates slowly.

2-Methylnonane is achiral as it lacks a chiral center; that is, it is an asymmetrical molecule and it cannot be superimposed on its mirror image. It represents the first among the four monomethyl nonane isomers.
