= Eiji Osawa =

Japanese chemist

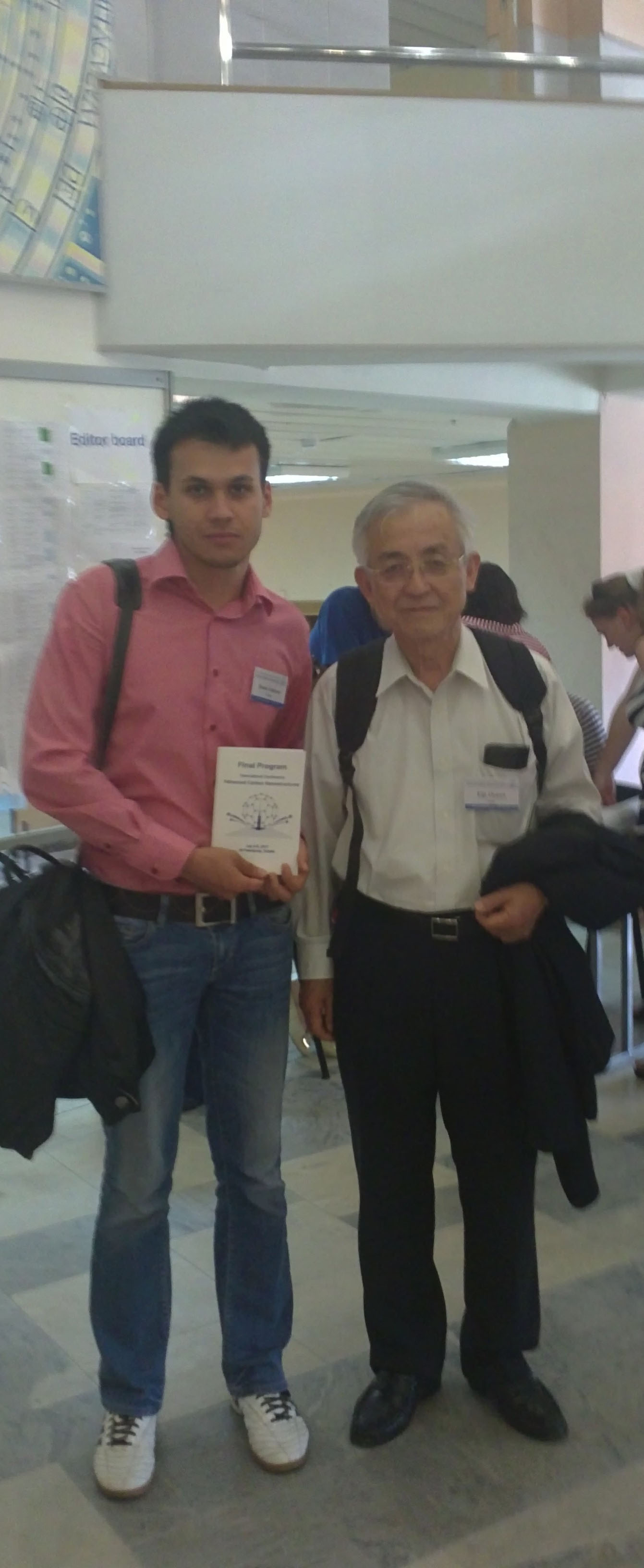
Denis Sh. Sabirov (left) and Eiji Osawa (right), International Conference “Advanced Carbon Nanostructures”, Saint Petersburg, Russia, 2011

Eiji Osawa (Japanese: 大澤 映二, Hepburn: Ōsawa Eiji; born June 9, 1935 in Toyama, Japan) is a former professor of computational chemistry, noted for his prediction of the C_{60} molecule in 1970.

Osawa received his Master's of Engineering in chemistry from Kyoto University's Department of Industrial Chemistry and then became an engineer at Teijin Co., Ltd. In 1964, he returned to Kyoto University and earned a Doctorate of Engineering in chemistry under Professor M. Yoshida. After three years of postdoctoral work at the University of Wisconsin, Princeton University, and the State University of New York at Stony Brook, in 1970 he became an assistant professor at Hokkaido University. In 1990, Osawa became a full professor at Toyahashi University of Technology, where he retired in 2001. Upon his retirement, assisted by Futaba, Co., Ltd., headquartered in Chiba, Osawa started the research and development company Nano-Carbon Research Institute, Ltd.

== C_{60} molecule prediction ==
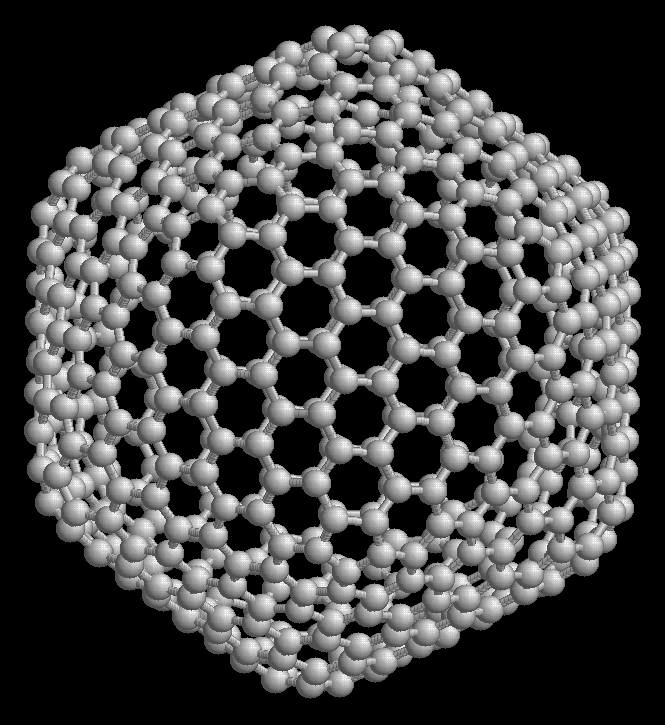
The icosahedral fullerene C_{540}, another member of the family of fullerenes.

The icosahedral C_{60}H_{60} cage was mentioned in 1965 as a possible topological structure. Eiji Osawa predicted the existence of C_{60} in 1970. He noticed that the structure of a corannulene molecule was a subset of a football shape, and he hypothesised that a full ball shape could also exist. Japanese scientific journals reported his idea, but it did not reach Europe or the Americas.

In 1996, Harold Kroto, Robert Curl and Richard Smalley were awarded the 1996 Nobel Prize in Chemistry for their roles in the discovery of this class of molecules. C_{60} and other fullerenes were later noticed occurring outside the laboratory.
