= Harry Marsh =

English chemist (1926–2023)

Harry Marsh (17 April 1926 – 25 September 2023) was an English chemist. His professional focus was carbon science.

Born on 17 April 1926 in West Durham, England, Marsh spent much of his career at the Northern Carbon Research Laboratories of the University of Newcastle upon Tyne. His research investigated the structure and adsorptive properties of carbons. At the 2006 meeting of the International Carbon Society he received their lifetime achievement award.

As of 2016, Marsh lived in Whitley Bay. He died on 25 September 2023, at the age of 97.

== Publications ==
- Harry Marsh; Francisco Rodríguez-Reinoso (2006). Activated carbon (1st ed.). Elsevier. ISBN 978-0-08-044463-5. OCLC 71541218.
- Harry Marsh, ed. (2001). Activated carbon compendium : a collection of papers from the journal Carbon 1996-2000 (1st ed.). Elsevier. ISBN 978-0-08-044030-9. OCLC 50041805.
- Harry Marsh; Francisco Rodríguez-Reinoso (2000). Sciences of carbon materials. Universidad de Alicante. ISBN 978-84-7908-544-5. OCLC 46470741.
- Harry Marsh (1970). Studies of formation, structure and properties of carbonaceous substances (Thesis). University of Newcastle upon Tyne.
