= C70 fullerene =

Allotrope of carbon

C_{70} fullerene
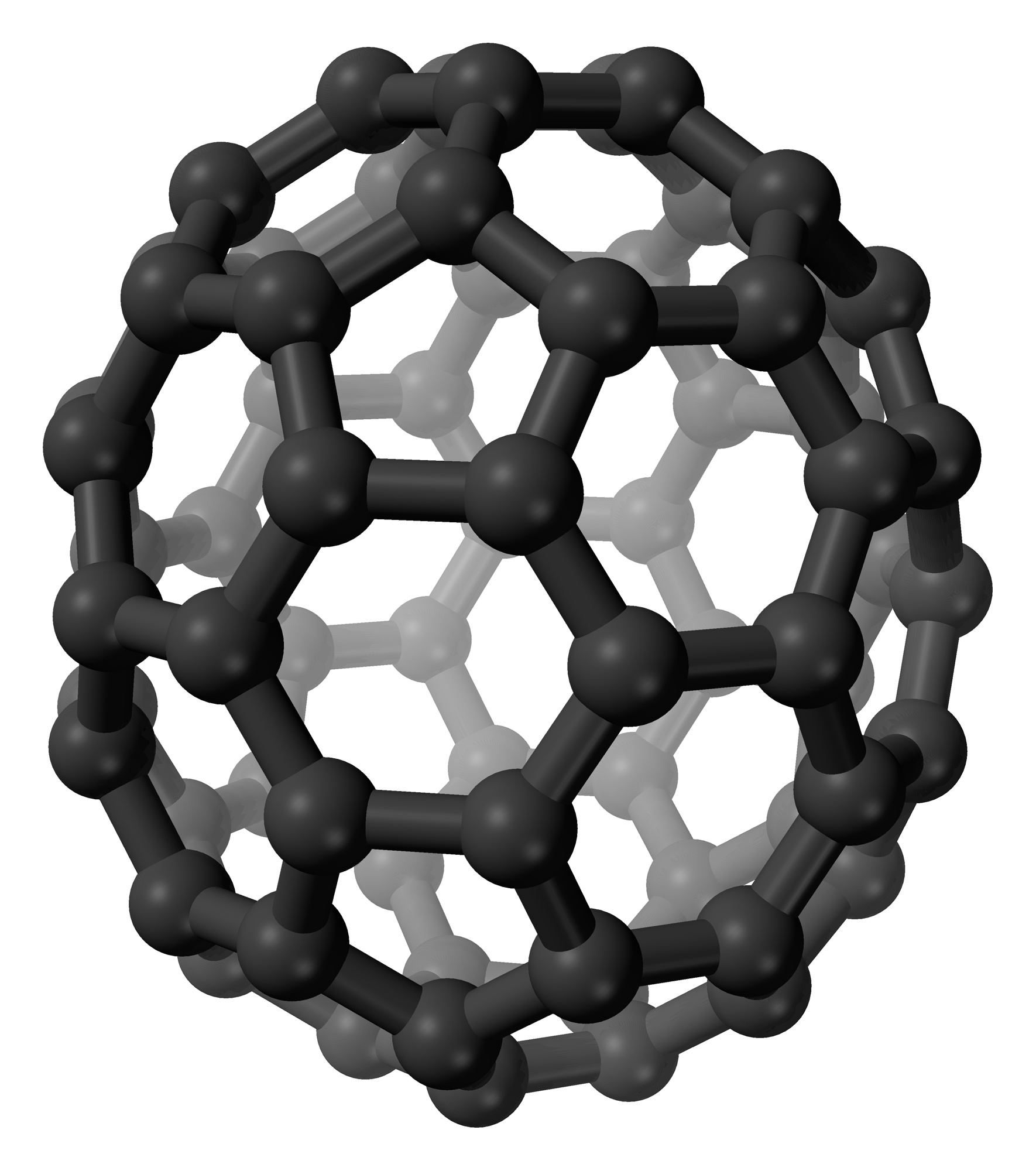

Names
- Preferred IUPAC name (C_{70}-D_{5h(6)})[5,6]Fullerene
- Other names Fullerene-C_{70}, rugbyballene

Identifiers
| CAS Number | 115383-22-7 |
| 3D model (JSmol) | Interactive image |
| ChEBI | CHEBI:33195 |
| ChemSpider | 17288599 |
| ECHA InfoCard | 100.162.223 |
| PubChem CID | 16131935 |
| CompTox Dashboard (EPA) | DTXSID90151050 |
- InChI: InChI=1S/C70/c1-2-22-5-6-24-13-14-26-11-9-23-4-3(21(1)51-52(22)54(24)55(26)53(23)51)33-31(1)61-35-7-8-27-15-16-29-19-20-30-18-17-28-12-10(25(7)56-57(27)59(29)60(30)58(28)56)37(35)63(33)65-36(4)40(9)67(44(17)42(12)65)69-46(11)47(14)70(50(20)49(18)69)68-43(13)39(6)66(45(16)48(19)68)64-34(5)32(2)62(61)38(8)41(15)64 Key: ATLMFJTZZPOKLC-UHFFFAOYSA-N; InChI=1/C70/c1-2-22-5-6-24-13-14-26-11-9-23-4-3(21(1)51-52(22)54(24)55(26)53(23)51)33-31(1)61-35-7-8-27-15-16-29-19-20-30-18-17-28-12-10(25(7)56-57(27)59(29)60(30)58(28)56)37(35)63(33)65-36(4)40(9)67(44(17)42(12)65)69-46(11)47(14)70(50(20)49(18)69)68-43(13)39(6)66(45(16)48(19)68)64-34(5)32(2)62(61)38(8)41(15)64 Key: ATLMFJTZZPOKLC-UHFFFAOYAA
- SMILES: C12=C3C4=C5C6=C7C8=C9C%10=C%11C%12=C%13C%10=C%10C8=C5C1=C%10C1=C%13C5=C8C1=C2C1=C3C2=C3C%10=C%13C%14=C3C1=C8C1=C3C5=C%12C5=C8C%11=C%11C9=C7C7=C9C6=C4C2=C2C%10=C4C(=C29)C2=C6C(=C8C8=C9C6=C4C%13=C9C(=C%141)C3=C85)C%11=C27

Properties
| Chemical formula | C_{70} |
| Molar mass | 840.770 g·mol^{−1} |
| Appearance | Dark needle-like crystals |
| Density | 1.7 g/cm^{3} |
| Melting point | sublimates at ~850 °C |
| Solubility in water | insoluble in water |
| Band gap | 1.77 eV |
- Except where otherwise noted, data are given for materials in their standard state (at 25 °C [77 °F], 100 kPa). verify (what is ?) Infobox references

C_{70} fullerene is the fullerene molecule consisting of 70 carbon atoms. It is a cage-like fused-ring structure which resembles a rugby ball, made of 25 hexagons and 12 pentagons, with a carbon atom at the vertices of each polygon and a bond along each polygon edge. A related fullerene molecule, named buckminsterfullerene (or C_{60} fullerene) consists of 60 carbon atoms.

It was first intentionally prepared in 1985 by Harold Kroto, James R. Heath, Sean O'Brien, Robert Curl and Richard Smalley at Rice University. Kroto, Curl and Smalley were awarded the 1996 Nobel Prize in Chemistry for their roles in the discovery of cage-like fullerenes. The name is a homage to Buckminster Fuller, whose geodesic domes these molecules resemble.

== History ==
Theoretical predictions of buckyball molecules appeared in the late 1960s to early 1970s, but they went largely unnoticed. In the early 1970s, the chemistry of unsaturated carbon configurations was studied by a group at the University of Sussex, led by Harry Kroto and David Walton. In the 1980s a technique was developed by Richard Smalley and Bob Curl at Rice University, Texas to isolate these substances. They used laser vaporization of a suitable target to produce clusters of atoms. Kroto realized that by using a graphite target.

C_{70} was discovered in 1985 by Robert Curl, Harold Kroto, and Richard Smalley. Using laser evaporation of graphite they found C_{n} clusters (for even n with n > 20) of which the most common were C_{60} and C_{70}. For this discovery they were awarded the 1996 Nobel Prize in Chemistry. The discovery of buckyballs was serendipitous, as the scientists were aiming to produce carbon plasmas to replicate and characterize unidentified interstellar matter. Mass spectrometry analysis of the product indicated the formation of spheroidal carbon molecules.

== Synthesis ==
In 1990, K. Fostiropoulos, W. Krätchmer and D. R. Huffman developed a simple and efficient method of producing fullerenes in gram and even kilogram amounts which boosted fullerene research. In this technique, carbon soot is produced from two high-purity graphite electrodes by igniting an arc discharge between them in an inert atmosphere (helium gas). Alternatively, soot is produced by laser ablation of graphite or pyrolysis of aromatic hydrocarbons. Fullerenes are extracted from the soot using a multistep procedure. First, the soot is dissolved in appropriate organic solvents. This step yields a solution containing up to 70% of C_{60} and 15% of C_{70}, as well as other fullerenes. These fractions are separated using chromatography.

== Properties ==
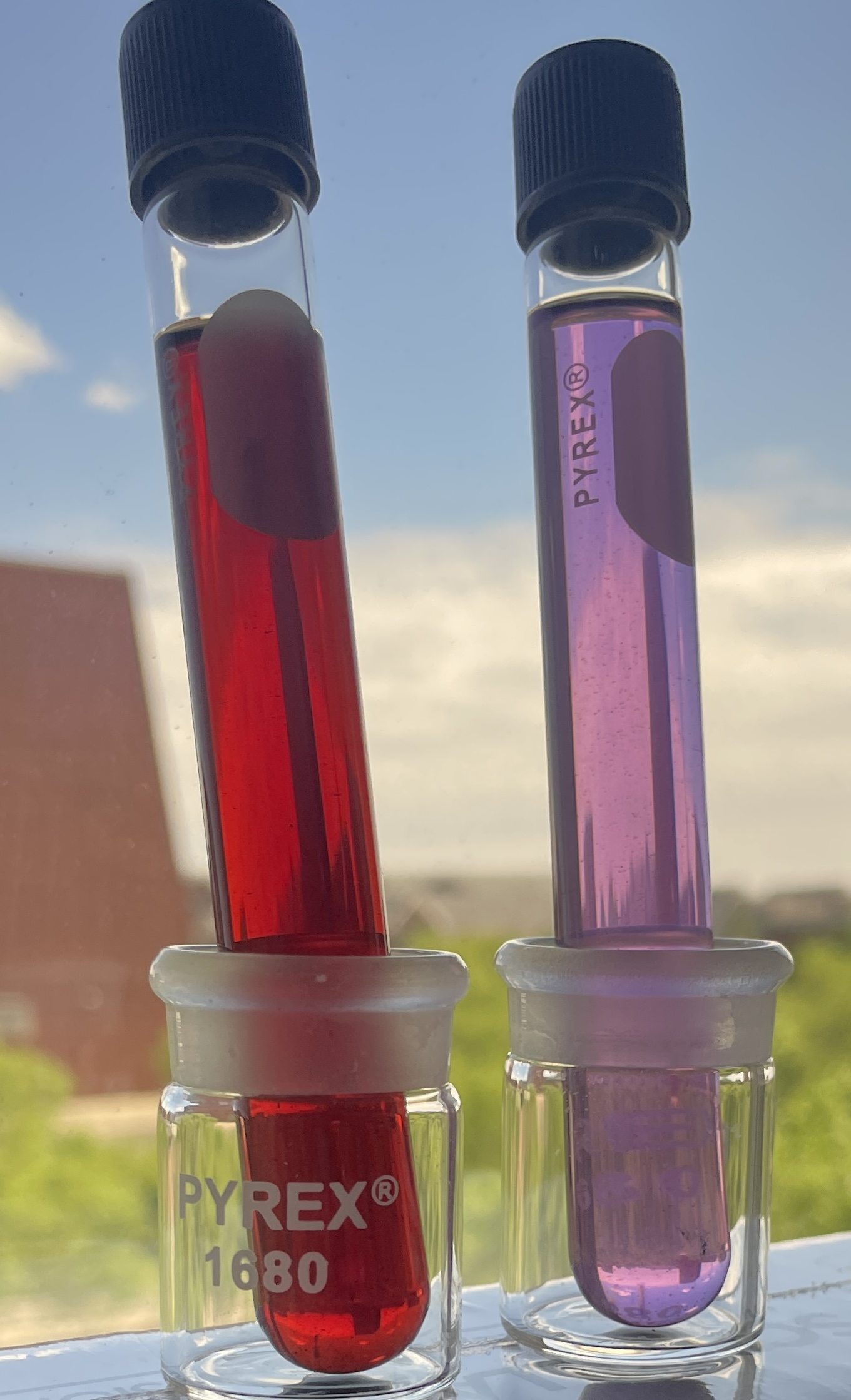
Solutions of C_{70} (left) and C_{60} in 1,2-dichlorobenzene

C_{70} undergo six reversible, one-electron reductions, culminating in C^{6−}_{70}, whereas oxidation is irreversible. The first reduction requires around 1.0 V (Fc/Fc^{+}), indicating that C_{70} is a weak electron acceptor.

Saturated solubility of C_{70} (S, mg/mL)
| Solvent | S (mg/mL) |
|---|---|
| 1,2-dichlorobenzene | 36.2 |
| carbon disulfide | 9.875 |
| xylene | 3.985 |
| toluene | 1.406 |
| benzene | 1.3 |
| carbon tetrachloride | 0.121 |
| n-hexane | 0.013 |
| cyclohexane | 0.08 |
| pentane | 0.002 |
| octane | 0.042 |
| decane | 0.053 |
| dodecane | 0.098 |
| heptane | 0.047 |
| isopropanol | 0.0021 |
| mesitylene | 1.472 |
| dichloromethane | 0.080 |

Fullerenes are sparingly soluble in many aromatic solvents such as toluene and carbon disulfide but not in water. Solutions of C_{70} are a reddish brown. Millimeter-sized crystals of C_{70} can be grown from solution.

== Structure ==
The C_{70} molecule has a D_{5h} symmetry and contains 37 faces (25 hexagons and 12 pentagons) with a carbon atom at the vertices of each polygon and a bond along each polygon edge. Its structure is similar to that of C_{60} molecule (20 hexagons and 12 pentagons), but has a belt of 5 hexagons inserted at the equator. The molecule has eight bond lengths ranging between 0.137 and 0.146 nm. Each carbon atom in the structure is bonded covalently with 3 others.

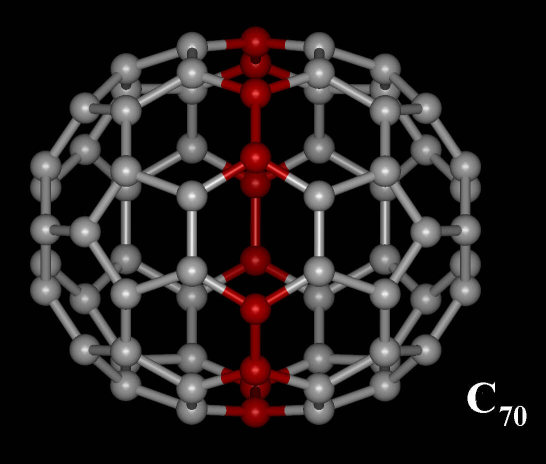
The structure of C_{70} molecule. Red atoms indicate five hexagons additional to the C_{60} molecule.

Solid C_{70} crystallizes in monoclinic, hexagonal, rhombohedral, and face-centered cubic (fcc) polymorphs at room temperature. The fcc phase is more stable at temperatures above 70 °C. The presence of these phases is rationalized as follows. In a solid, C_{70} molecules form an fcc arrangement where the overall symmetry depends on their relative orientations. The low-symmetry monoclinic form is observed when molecular rotation is locked by temperature or strain. Partial rotation along one of the symmetry axes of the molecule results in the higher hexagonal or rhombohedral symmetries, which turn into a cubic structure when the molecules start freely rotating.

All phases of C_{70} form brownish crystals with a bandgap of 1.77 eV; they are n-type semiconductors where conductivity is attributed to oxygen diffusion into the solid from atmosphere. The unit cell of fcc C_{70} solid contains voids at 4 octahedral and 12 tetrahedral sites. They are large enough to accommodate impurity atoms. When electron-donating elements, such as alkali metals, are doped into these voids, C_{70} converts into a conductor with conductivity up to around 2 S/cm.

Some of the C_{70} solid phases
| Symmetry | Space group | No | Pearson symbol | a (nm) | b (nm) | c (nm) | Z | Density (g/cm^{3}) |
|---|---|---|---|---|---|---|---|---|
| Monoclinic | P2_{1}/m | 11 | mP560 | 1.996 | 1.851 | 1.996 | 8 | |
| Hexagonal | P6_{3}/mmc | 194 | hP140 | 1.011 | 1.011 | 1.858 | 2 | 1.70 |
| Cubic | Fm3̅m | 225 | cF280 | 1.496 | 1.496 | 1.496 | 4 | 1.67 |

== Bibliography ==
- Katz, E. A. (2006). "Fullerene Thin Films as Photovoltaic Material". In Sōga, Tetsuo (ed.). Nanostructured materials for solar energy conversion. Elsevier. pp. 361–443. ISBN 978-0-444-52844-5.
