= Carbocatalysis =

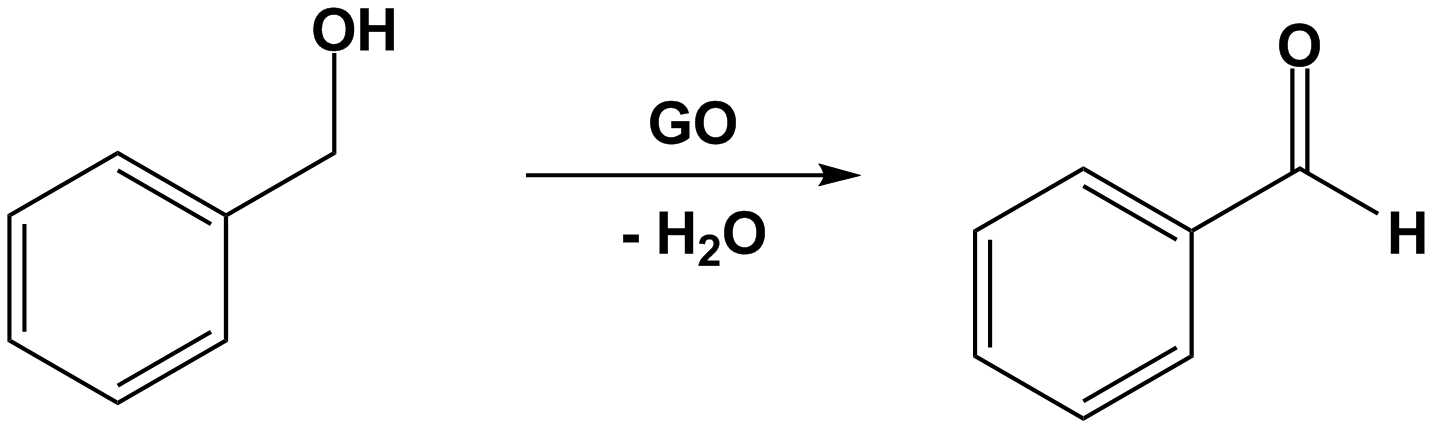
Carbocatalyzed oxidation of alcohols to aldehydes using graphene oxide (GO).

Carbocatalysis is a form of catalysis that uses heterogeneous carbon materials for the transformation or synthesis of organic or inorganic substrates. The catalysts are characterized by their high surface areas, surface functionality, and large, aromatic basal planes. Carbocatalysis can be distinguishable from supported catalysis (such as palladium on carbon) in that no metal is present, or if metals are present they are not the active species.

As of 2010, the mechanisms of reactivity are not well understood.

One of the most common examples of carbocatalysis is the oxidative dehydrogenation of ethylbenzene to styrene discovered in the 1970s. Also in the industrial process of (non-oxidative) dehydrogenation of ethylbenzene, the potassium-promoted iron oxide catalyst is coated with a carbon layer as the active phase. In another early example, a variety of substituted nitrobenzenes were reduced to the corresponding aniline using hydrazine and graphite as the catalyst.

The discovery of nanostructured carbon allotropes such as carbon nanotubes, fullerenes, or graphene promoted further developments. Oxidized carbon nanotubes were used to dehydrogenate n-butane to 1-butene, and to selectively oxidize acrolein to acrylic acid. Fullerenes were used in the catalytic reduction of nitrobenzene to aniline in the presence of H_{2}. Graphene oxide was used as a carbocatalyst to facilitate the oxidation of alcohols to the corresponding aldehydes/ketones (shown in the picture), the hydration of alkynes, and the oxidation of alkenes.
