= Fullerene =

Allotrope of carbon

Ball-and-stick model of the C_{60} fullerene (buckminsterfullerene).

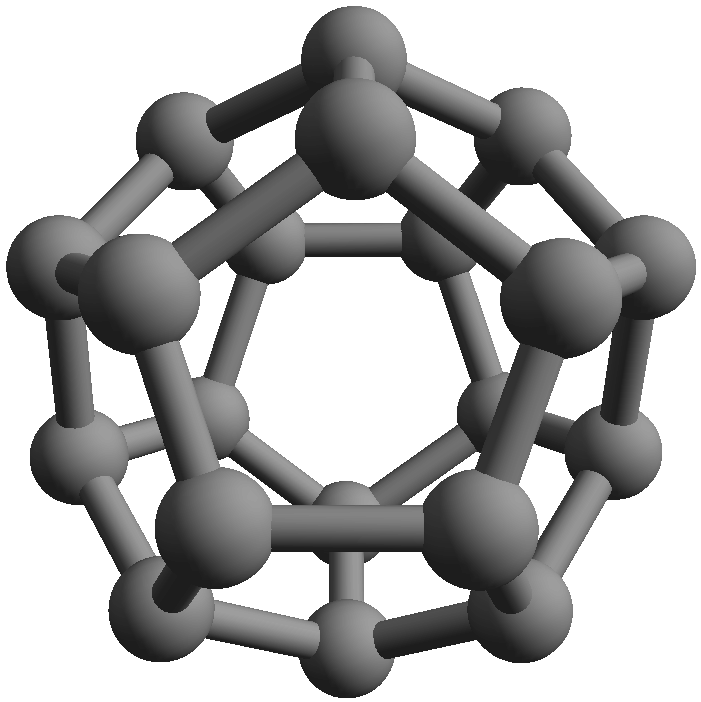
Ball-and-stick model of the C_{20} fullerene.

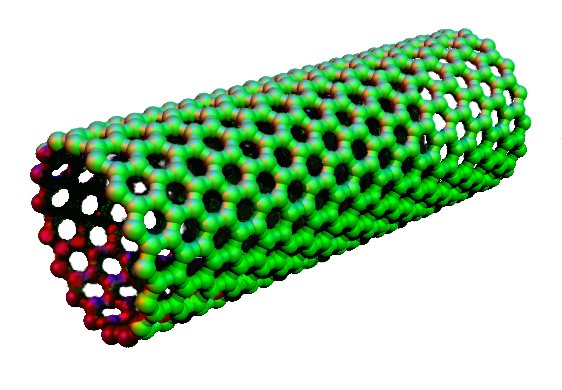
Space-filling model of a carbon nanotube

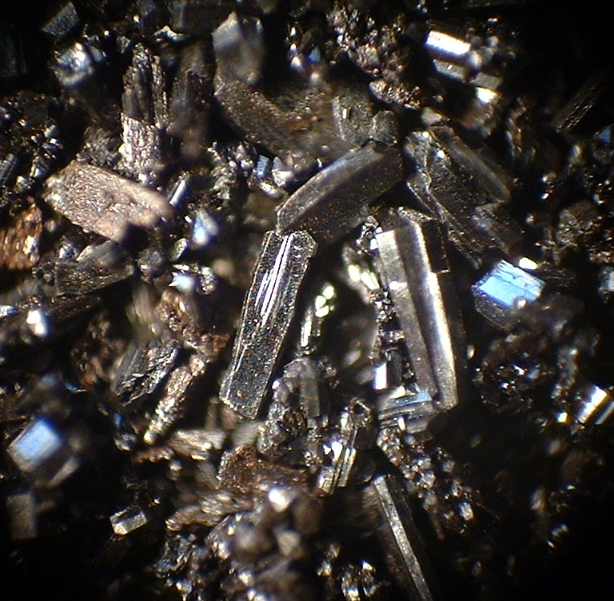
C_{60} fullerite (bulk solid C_{60}).

A fullerene is an allotrope of carbon whose molecules consist of carbon atoms connected to form a closed cage. The molecules may have hollow sphere- and ellipsoid-like forms, tubes, or other shapes. The carbons are usually arranged in 5- and 6-membered rings. The family is named after buckminsterfullerene (C_{60}), which in turn is named after Buckminster Fuller. C_{60} is also the first discovered and best characterized fullerene. C_{60} has a hollow sphere-like form, but other fullerenes are known with ellipsoid-like shapes.

The closed fullerenes, especially C_{60}, are also informally called buckyballs for their resemblance to the standard ball of association football. IUPAC defines fullerenes as "polyhedral closed cages made up entirely of n three-coordinate carbon atoms and having 12 pentagonal and (n/2-10) hexagonal faces, where n ≥ 20."

== History ==
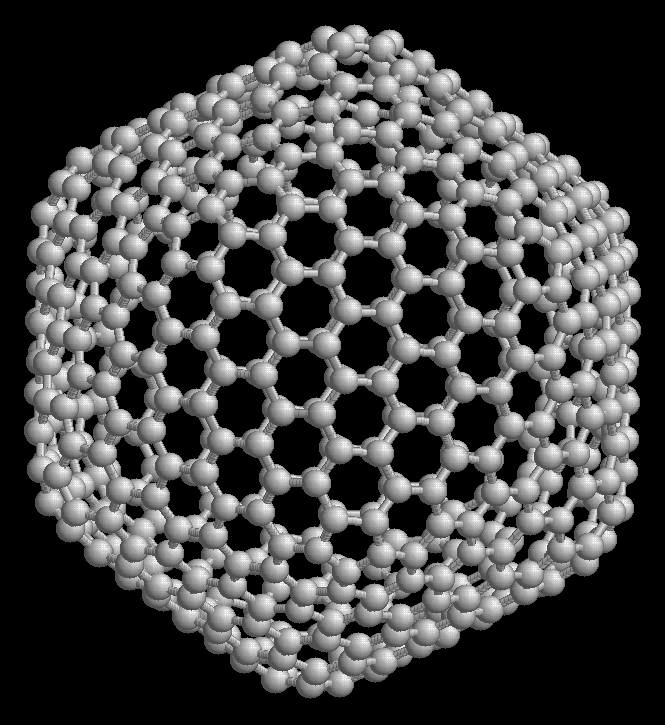
The icosahedral fullerene C_{540}, another member of the family of fullerenes

=== Predictions and limited observations ===
The icosahedral C_{60}H_{60} cage was mentioned in 1965 as a possible topological structure. Eiji Osawa predicted the existence of C_{60} in 1970. He noticed that the structure of a corannulene molecule was a subset of the shape of a football, and hypothesised that a full ball shape could also exist. Japanese scientific journals reported his idea, but neither it nor any translations of it reached Europe or the Americas.

Also in 1970, R. W. Henson (former member of the UK Atomic Energy Research Establishment) proposed the C_{60} structure and made a model of it. Unfortunately, the evidence for that new form of carbon was very weak at the time, so the proposal was met with skepticism, and was never published. It was acknowledged only in 1999.

In 1973, independently from Henson, D. A. Bochvar and E. G. Galpern made a quantum-chemical analysis of the stability of C_{60} and calculated its electronic structure. The paper was published in 1973, but the scientific community did not give much importance to this theoretical prediction.

Around 1980, Sumio Iijima identified the molecule of C_{60} from an electron microscope image of carbon black, where it formed the core of a particle with the structure of a "bucky onion".

Also in the 1980s at MIT, Mildred Dresselhaus and Morinobu Endo, collaborating with T. Venkatesan, directed studies blasting graphite with lasers, producing carbon clusters of atoms, which would be later identified as "fullerenes."

Fullerenes had been predicted for some time, but only after their accidental synthesis in 1985 were they detected in nature and outer space. The discovery of fullerenes greatly expanded the number of known allotropes of carbon, which had previously been limited to graphite, diamond, and amorphous carbon such as soot and charcoal. They have been the subject of intense research, both for their chemistry and for their technological applications, especially in materials science, electronics, and nanotechnology.

=== Discovery of C_{60} ===
In 1985, Harold Kroto of the University of Sussex, working with James R. Heath, Sean O'Brien, Robert Curl and Richard Smalley from Rice University, discovered fullerenes in the sooty residue created by vaporising carbon in a helium atmosphere. In the mass spectrum of the product, discrete peaks appeared corresponding to molecules with the exact mass of sixty or seventy or more carbon atoms, namely C_{60} and C_{70}. The team identified their structure as the now familiar "buckyballs".

The name "buckminsterfullerene" was eventually chosen for C_{60} by the discoverers as an homage to American architect Buckminster Fuller for the vague similarity of the structure to the geodesic domes which he popularized; which, if they were extended to a full sphere, would also have the icosahedral symmetry group. The "ene" ending was chosen to indicate that the carbons are unsaturated, being connected to only three other atoms instead of the normal four. The shortened name "fullerene" eventually came to be applied to the whole family.

Kroto, Curl, and Smalley were awarded the 1996 Nobel Prize in Chemistry for their roles in the discovery of this class of molecules.

=== Further developments ===
Kroto and the Rice team already discovered other fullerenes besides C_{60}, and the list was much expanded in the following years. Carbon nanotubes were first discovered and synthesized in 1991.

After their discovery, minute quantities of fullerenes were found to be produced in sooty flames, and by lightning discharges in the atmosphere. In 1992, fullerenes were found in a family of mineraloids known as shungites in Karelia, Russia.

The production techniques were improved by many scientists, including Donald Huffman, Wolfgang Krätschmer, Lowell D. Lamb, and Konstantinos Fostiropoulos. Thanks to their efforts, by 1990 it was relatively easy to produce gram-sized samples of fullerene powder. Fullerene purification remains a challenge to chemists and to a large extent determines fullerene prices.

In 2010, the spectral signatures of C_{60} and C_{70} were observed by NASA's Spitzer infrared telescope in a cloud of cosmic dust surrounding a star 6500 light years away. Kroto commented: "This most exciting breakthrough provides convincing evidence that the buckyball has, as I long suspected, existed since time immemorial in the dark recesses of our galaxy." According to astronomer Letizia Stanghellini, "It's possible that buckyballs from outer space provided seeds for life on Earth." In 2019, ionized C_{60} molecules were detected with the Hubble Space Telescope in the space between those stars.

== Buckyballs ==
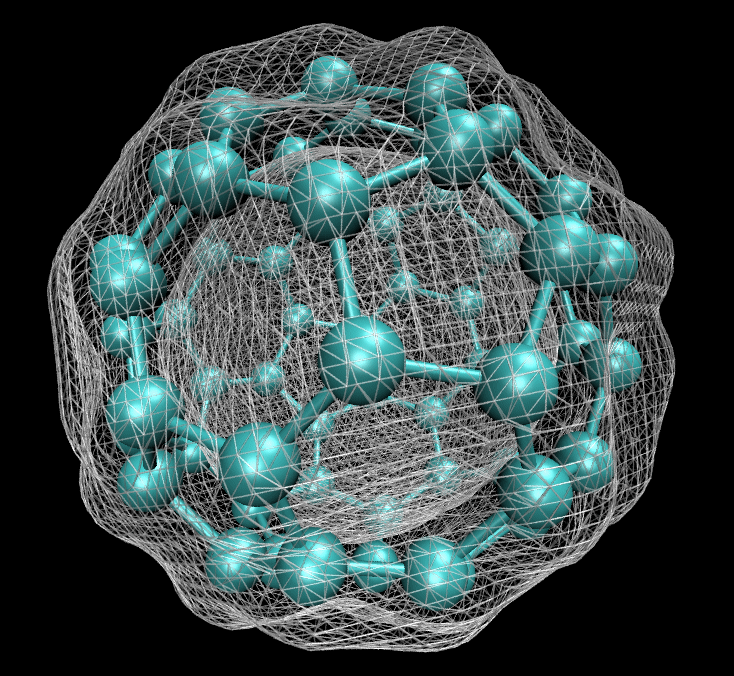
C_{60} with isosurface of ground state electron density as calculated with density functional theory (DFT)

Rotating view of C_{60}, one kind of fullerene

=== Inventory ===
Below is a table of main closed carbon fullerenes synthesized and characterized so far. Fullerenes with fewer than 60 carbon atoms have been called "lower fullerenes", and those with more than 70 atoms "higher fullerenes".

Formula	Num. Isom.	Mol. Symm.	Cryst. Symm.	Space group	No	Pearson symbol	a (nm)	b (nm)	c (nm)	β°	Z	ρ (g/cm^{3})
C_{20}	1	I_{h}										
C_{60}	1	I_{h}										
C_{70}	1	D_{5h}										
C_{72}	1	D_{6h}										
C_{74}	1	D_{3h}										
C_{76}	2	D_{2}*	Monoclinic	P2_{1}	4	mP2	1.102	1.108	1.768	108.10	2	1.48
C_{76}	2	D_{2}*	Cubic	Fm3̅m	225	cF4	1.5475	1.5475	1.5475	90	4	1.64
C_{78}	5	D_{2v}										
C_{80}	7											
C_{82}	9	C_{2}, C_{2v}, C_{3v}	Monoclinic	P2_{1}	4	mP2	1.141	1.1355	1.8355	108.07	2	
C_{84}	24	D_{2}*, D_{2d}	Cubic	Fm3̅m			1.5817	1.5817	1.5817	90		
C_{86}	19											
C_{88}	35											
C_{90}	46											
C_{3996}												

In the table, "Num.Isom." is the number of possible isomers within the "isolated pentagon rule", which states that two pentagons in a fullerene should not share edges. "Mol.Symm." is the symmetry of the molecule, whereas "Cryst.Symm." is that of the crystalline framework in the solid state. Both are specified for the most experimentally abundant form(s). The asterisk * marks symmetries with more than one chiral form.

The smallest possible fullerene is the dodecahedral C_{20}. There are no fullerenes with 22 vertices. The number of different fullerenes C_{2n} grows with increasing n = 12, 13, 14, ..., roughly in proportion to n^{9} (sequence A007894 in the OEIS). For instance, there are 1812 non-isomorphic fullerenes C_{60}. Note that only one form of C_{60}, buckminsterfullerene, has no pair of adjacent pentagons (the smallest such fullerene). To further illustrate the growth, there are 214,127,713 non-isomorphic fullerenes C_{200}, 15,655,672 of which have no adjacent pentagons. Optimized structures of many fullerene isomers are published and listed on the web.

When C_{76} or C_{82} crystals are grown from toluene solution they have a monoclinic symmetry. The crystal structure contains toluene molecules packed between the spheres of the fullerene. However, evaporation of the solvent from C_{76} transforms it into a face-centered cubic form. Both monoclinic and face-centered cubic (fcc) phases are known for better-characterized C_{60} and C_{70} fullerenes.

=== Buckminsterfullerene ===
Buckminsterfullerene is the smallest fullerene molecule containing pentagonal and hexagonal rings in which no two pentagons share an edge (which can be destabilizing, as in pentalene). It is also most common in terms of natural occurrence, as it can often be found in soot.

The empirical formula of buckminsterfullerene is C_{60} and its structure is a truncated icosahedron, which resembles an association football ball of the type made of twenty hexagons and twelve pentagons, with a carbon atom at the vertices of each polygon and a bond along each polygon edge.

The van der Waals diameter of a buckminsterfullerene molecule is about 1.1 nanometers (nm). The nucleus to nucleus diameter of a buckminsterfullerene molecule is about 0.71 nm.

The buckminsterfullerene molecule has two bond lengths. The 6:6 ring bonds (between two hexagons) can be considered "double bonds" and are shorter (1.401 Å) than the 6:5 bonds (1.458 Å, between a hexagon and a pentagon). The weighted average bond length is 1.44 Å.

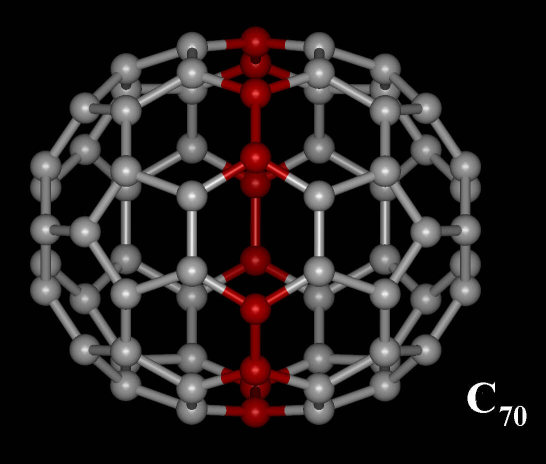
C_{70} has 10 additional atoms (shown in red) added to C_{60} and a hemisphere rotated to fit

Another fairly common fullerene has empirical formula C_{70}, but fullerenes with 72, 76, 84 and even up to 100 carbon atoms are commonly obtained. C_{76}, C_{78}, C_{80}, and C_{84} are chiral because they are D_{2}-symmetric. Their enantiomers have been resolved.

== Heterofullerenes and non-carbon fullerenes ==
Many heterofullerenes have been synthesized (or studied theoretically) in which some or all the carbon atoms are replaced by other elements, such as nitrogen (azafullerenes). Buckyballs containing boron atoms (borafullerenes) have been observed, such as C_{40} and C_{80}.

Inorganic (carbon-free) fullerene-type structures have been built with the molybdenum(IV) sulfide (MoS_{2}), long used as a graphite-like lubricant, tungsten (WS_{2}), titanium (TiS_{2}) and niobium (NbS_{2}). These materials were found to be stable up to at least 350 tons/cm^{2} (34.3 GPa).

Icosahedral or distorted-icosahedral fullerene-like complexes have also been prepared for germanium, tin, and lead; some of these complexes are spacious enough to hold most transition metal atoms.

== Related polymeric materials ==
Carbon nanotubes are described as open-ended cylinders are a major variant of fullerenes and have received much attention. These tubes of carbon are usually only a few nanometres wide, but they can range from less than a micrometer to several millimeters in length. They often have closed ends, but can be open-ended. There are also cases in which the tube reduces in diameter before closing off. Their molecular structure results in extraordinary macroscopic properties, including high tensile strength, high electrical conductivity, high ductility, high heat conductivity, and relative chemical inactivity (as it is cylindrical and "planar" — that is, it has no "exposed" atoms that can be easily displaced).

Nested closed fullerenes have been named bucky onions, which have been proposed for use in lubricants. Nested carbon nanotubes, dubbed "carbon megatubes", have also been synthesized.

The bulk solid form of pure or mixed fullerenes is called fullerite.

Buckyballs can be connected, such as in linked "ball-and-chain" dimers (two buckyballs linked by a carbon chain) and rings of buckyballs linked together.

Non-carbon nanotubes have attracted attention.

== Properties ==
=== Topology ===
Schlegel diagrams are often used to clarify the 3D structure of closed-shell fullerenes, as 2D projections are often not ideal in this sense.

In mathematical terms, the combinatorial topology (that is, the carbon atoms and the bonds between them, ignoring their positions and distances) of a closed-shell fullerene with a simple sphere-like mean surface (orientable, genus zero) can be represented as a convex polyhedron; more precisely, its one-dimensional skeleton, consisting of its vertices and edges. The Schlegel diagram is a projection of that skeleton onto one of the faces of the polyhedron, through a point just outside that face; so that all other vertices project inside that face.

Schlegel diagrams of some fullerenes

C20
(dodecahedron)

C26

C60
(truncated icosahedron)

C70

The Schlegel diagram of a closed fullerene is a graph that is planar and 3-regular (or "cubic"; meaning that all vertices have degree 3).

A closed fullerene with sphere-like shell must have at least some cycles that are pentagons or heptagons. More precisely, if all the faces have 5 or 6 sides, it follows from Euler's polyhedron formula, V−E+F=2 (where V, E, F are the numbers of vertices, edges, and faces), that V must be even, and that there must be exactly 12 pentagons and V/2−10 hexagons. Similar constraints exist if the fullerene has heptagonal (seven-atom) cycles.

=== Bonding ===
Since each carbon atom is connected to only three neighbors, instead of the usual four, it is customary to describe those bonds as being a mixture of single and double covalent bonds. The hybridization of carbon in C_{60} has been reported to be sp^{2.01}. The bonding state can be analyzed by Raman spectroscopy, IR spectroscopy and X-ray photoelectron spectroscopy.

=== Encapsulation ===
Additional atoms, ions, clusters, or small molecules can be trapped inside fullerenes to form inclusion compounds known as endohedral fullerenes. An unusual example is the egg-shaped fullerene Tb_{3}N@C_{84}, which violates the isolated pentagon rule. Evidence for a meteor impact at the end of the Permian period was found by analyzing noble gases preserved by being trapped in fullerenes.

=== Aromaticity ===
Researchers have been able to increase the reactivity of fullerenes by attaching active groups to their surfaces. Buckminsterfullerene does not exhibit "superaromaticity": that is, the electrons in the hexagonal rings do not delocalize over the whole molecule.

A spherical fullerene of n carbon atoms has n pi-bonding electrons, free to delocalize. These should try to delocalize over the whole molecule. The quantum mechanics of such an arrangement should be like only one shell of the well-known quantum mechanical structure of a single atom, with a stable filled shell for n = 2, 8, 18, 32, 50, 72, 98, 128, etc. (i.e., twice a perfect square number), but this series does not include 60. This 2(N + 1)^{2} rule (with N integer) for spherical aromaticity is the three-dimensional analogue of Hückel's rule. The 10+ cation would satisfy this rule, and should be aromatic. This has been shown to be the case using quantum chemical modelling, which showed the existence of strong diamagnetic sphere currents in the cation.

As a result, C_{60} in water tends to pick up two more electrons and become an anion. The nC_{60} described below may be the result of C_{60} trying to form a loose metallic bond.

== Reactions ==
=== Polymerization ===
Under high pressure and temperature, buckyballs collapse to form various one-, two-, or three-dimensional carbon frameworks. Single-strand polymers are formed using the Atom Transfer Radical Addition Polymerization (ATRAP) route.

"Ultrahard fullerite" is a coined term frequently used to describe material produced by high-pressure high-temperature (HPHT) processing of fullerite. Such treatment converts fullerite into a nanocrystalline form of diamond which has been reported to exhibit remarkable mechanical properties.

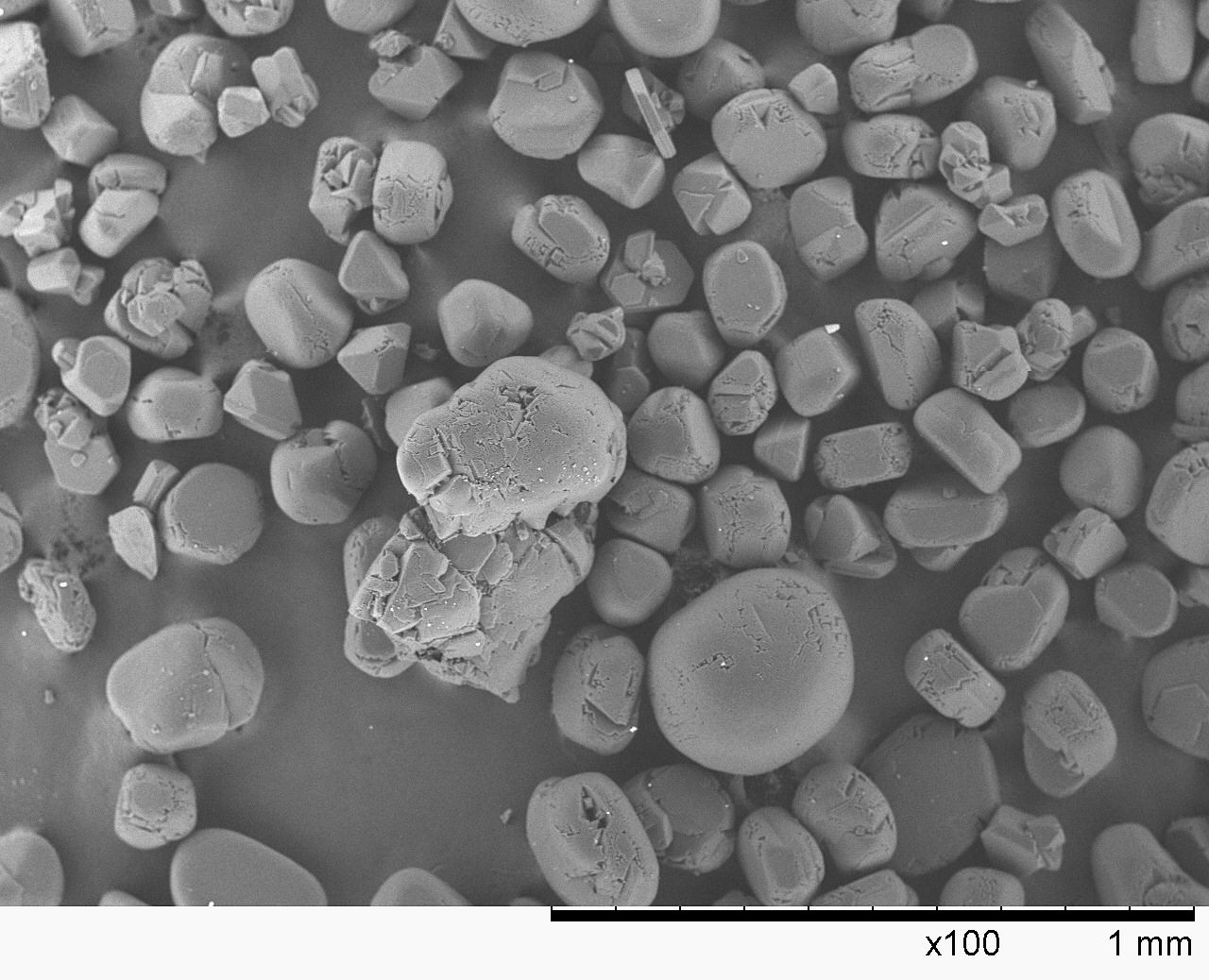
Fullerite (scanning electron microscope image)

=== Chemistry ===
Fullerenes are stable, but not totally unreactive. The sp^{2}-hybridized carbon atoms, which are at their energy minimum in planar graphite, must be bent to form the closed sphere or tube, which produces angle strain. The characteristic reaction of fullerenes is electrophilic addition at 6,6-double bonds, which reduces angle strain by changing sp^{2}-hybridized carbons into sp^{3}-hybridized ones. The change in hybridized orbitals causes the bond angles to decrease from about 120° in the sp^{2} orbitals to about 109.5° in the sp^{3} orbitals. This decrease in bond angles allows for the bonds to bend less when closing the sphere or tube, and thus, the molecule becomes more stable.

=== Solubility ===
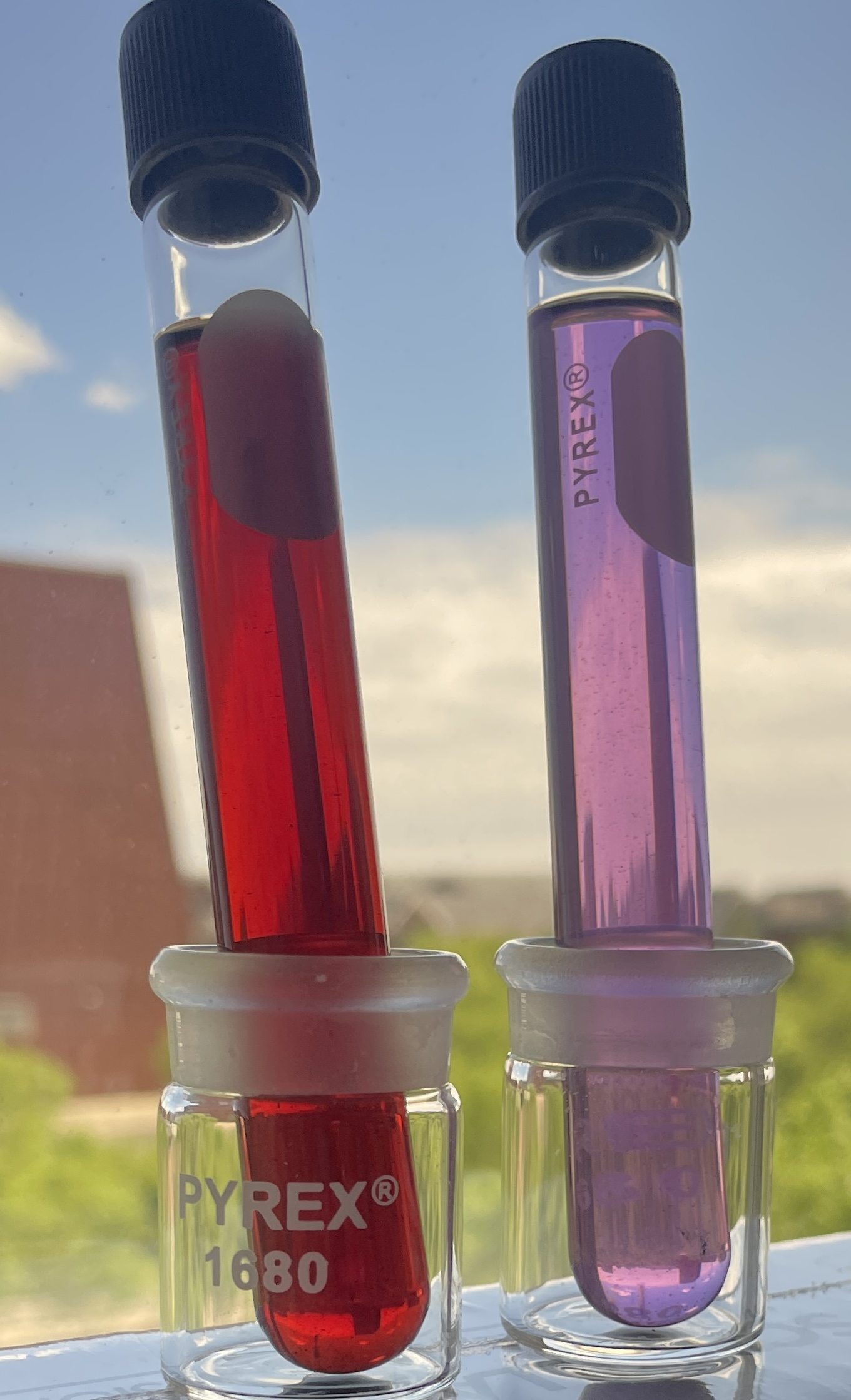
Solutions of C_{70} (left) and C_{60} in 1,2-dichlorobenzene.

Fullerenes are soluble in many organic solvents, such as toluene, chlorobenzene, and 1,2,3-trichloropropane. Solubilities are generally rather low, such as 8 g/L for C_{60} in carbon disulfide. Still, fullerenes are the only known allotrope of carbon that can be dissolved in common solvents at room temperature. Among the best solvents is 1-chloronaphthalene, which will dissolve 51 g/L of C_{60}.

Solutions of pure buckminsterfullerene have a deep purple color. Solutions of C_{70} are a reddish brown. The higher fullerenes C_{76} to C_{84} have a variety of colors.

Millimeter-sized crystals of C_{60} and C_{70}, both pure and solvated, can be grown from benzene solution. Crystallization of C_{60} from benzene solution below 30 °C (when solubility is maximum) yields a triclinic solid solvate C_{60}·4C_{6}H_{6}. Above 30 °C one obtains solvate-free fcc C_{60}.

=== Quantum mechanics ===
In 1999, researchers from the University of Vienna demonstrated that wave-particle duality applied to molecules such as fullerene.

At the time, C60 was at least an order of magnitude more massive than any object whose wave properties had previously been observed, making the fullerene experiment a landmark demonstration that quantum interference persists at the macromolecular scale.

=== Superconductivity ===
Fullerenes are normally electrical insulators, but when crystallized with alkali metals, the resultant compound can be conducting or even superconducting.

=== Stability ===
Two theories have been proposed to describe the molecular mechanisms that make fullerenes. The older, "bottom-up" theory proposes that they are built atom-by-atom. The alternative "top-down" approach claims that fullerenes form when much larger structures break into constituent parts.

In 2013 researchers discovered that asymmetrical fullerenes formed from larger structures settle into stable fullerenes. The synthesized substance was a particular metallofullerene consisting of 84 carbon atoms with two additional carbon atoms and two yttrium atoms inside the cage. The process produced approximately 100 micrograms.

However, they found that the asymmetrical molecule could theoretically collapse to form nearly every known fullerene and metallofullerene. Minor perturbations involving the breaking of a few molecular bonds cause the cage to become highly symmetrical and stable. This insight supports the theory that fullerenes can be formed from graphene when the appropriate molecular bonds are severed.

== Systematic naming ==
According to the IUPAC, to name a fullerene, one must cite the number of member atoms for the rings which comprise the fullerene, its symmetry point group in the Schoenflies notation, and the total number of atoms. For example, buckminsterfullerene C_{60} is systematically named (C_{60}-I_{h})[5,6]fullerene. The name of the point group should be retained in any derivative of said fullerene, even if that symmetry is lost by the derivation.

To indicate the position of substituted or attached elements, the fullerene atoms are usually numbered in a spiral path, usually starting with the ring on one of the main axes. If the structure of the fullerene does not allow such numbering, another starting atom was chosen to still achieve a spiral path sequence.

The latter is the case for C_{70}, which is (C_{70}-D_{5h(6)})[5,6]fullerene in IUPAC notation. The symmetry D_{5h(6)} means that this is the isomer where the C_{5} axis goes through a pentagon surrounded by hexagons rather than pentagons.

(C_{60}-Ih)[5,6]fullerene
Carbon numbering.

(C_{70}-D_{5h(6)})[5,6]fullerene
Carbon numbering.

(C_{70}-D_{5h(6)})[5,6]fullerene
Non-equivalent bonds shown by different colours.

3'H-Cyclopropa[1,2](C_{70}-D_{5h(6)})[5,6]fullerene.

3'H-Cyclopropa[2,12](C_{70}-D_{5h(6)})[5,6]fullerene.

C_{71}-PCBM, [1,2]-isomer.
IUPAC name is methyl 4-(3'-phenyl-3'H-cyclopropa[1,2](C_{70}-D_{5h(6)})[5,6]fullerene-3'-yl)butyrate.

In IUPAC's nomenclature, fully saturated analogues of fullerenes are called fulleranes. If the mesh has other element(s) substituted for one or more carbons, the compound is named a heterofullerene. If a double bond is replaced by a methylene bridge −CH_{2}−, the resulting structure is a homofullerene. If an atom is fully deleted and missing valences saturated with hydrogen atoms, it is a norfullerene. When bonds are removed (both sigma and pi), the compound becomes secofullerene; if some new bonds are added in an unconventional order, it is a cyclofullerene.

== Production ==
Fullerenes are components of soot which is produced in particular ways. In the original (and still prevailing) method, a large electric current is passed between two nearby graphite electrodes in an inert atmosphere. The resulting electric arc vaporizes the carbon that condenses into a sooty residue. Alternatively, soot is produced by laser ablation of graphite or pyrolysis of aromatic hydrocarbons. Combustion of benzene can also be efficient.

These processes yield a mixture of various fullerenes and other forms of carbon. The fullerenes are then extracted from the soot using appropriate organic solvents and separated by chromatography. One can obtain milligram quantities of fullerenes with 80 atoms or more. C_{76}, C_{78} and C_{84} are available commercially.

== Applications ==
=== Biomedical ===
Functionalized fullerenes have been researched extensively for several potential biomedical applications including high-performance MRI contrast agents, X-ray imaging contrast agents, photodynamic therapy for tumor treatment, and drug and gene delivery.

=== Solar Cells ===
Fullerene has been demonstrated in polymer-fullerene bulk heterojunction solar cells. This technology has been displaced by related non-fullerene devices.

== Safety and toxicity ==
In 2013, a comprehensive review on the toxicity of fullerene was published reviewing work beginning in the early 1990s to present and concluded that very little evidence gathered since the discovery of fullerenes indicate that C_{60} is toxic. The toxicity of these carbon nanoparticles is not only dose- and time-dependent, but also depends on a number of other factors such as:

- type (e.g.: C_{60}, C_{70}, M@C_{60}, M@C_{82})
- functional groups used to water-solubilize these nanoparticles (e.g.: OH, COOH)
- method of administration (e.g.: intravenous, intraperitoneal)

It was recommended to assess the pharmacology of every new fullerene- or metallofullerene-based complex individually as a different compound.

== Popular culture ==
Examples of fullerenes appear frequently in popular culture. Fullerenes appeared in fiction well before scientists took serious interest in them. In a humorously speculative 1966 column for New Scientist, David Jones suggested the possibility of making giant hollow carbon molecules by distorting a plane hexagonal net with the addition of impurity atoms.

== See also ==
- Buckypaper
- Carbocatalysis
- Dodecahedrane
- Fullerene ligand
- Goldberg–Coxeter construction
- Graphene
- Lonsdaleite
- Triumphene
- Truncated rhombic triacontahedron
