= Decane =

Alkane hydrocarbon; component of gasoline (petrol) and kerosene

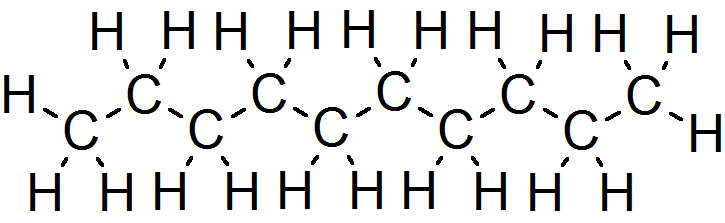

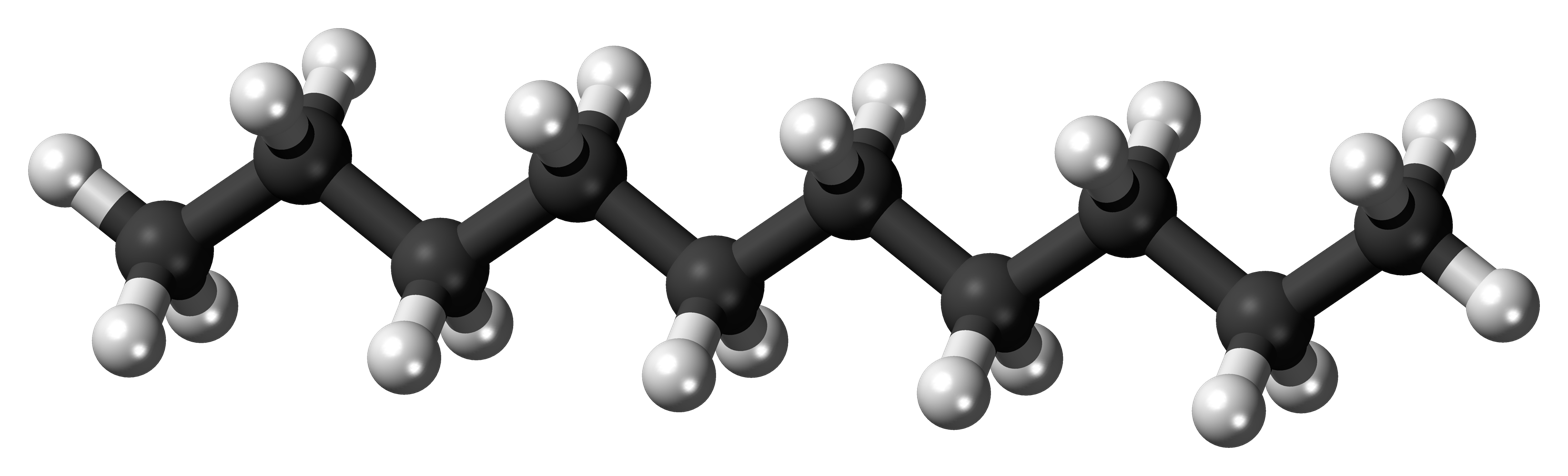

Names
- Preferred IUPAC name Decane
- Other names Decyl hydride

Identifiers
CAS Number	124-18-5
3D model (JSmol)	Interactive image
Beilstein Reference	1696981
ChEBI	CHEBI:41808
ChEMBL	ChEMBL134537
ChemSpider	14840
DrugBank	DB02826
ECHA InfoCard	100.004.262
EC Number	204-686-4
MeSH	decane
PubChem CID	15600
RTECS number	HD6550000
UNII	NK85062OIY
UN number	2247
CompTox Dashboard (EPA)	DTXSID6024913
- InChI: InChI=1S/C10H22/c1-3-5-7-9-10-8-6-4-2/h3-10H2,1-2H3 Key: DIOQZVSQGTUSAI-UHFFFAOYSA-N
- SMILES: CCCCCCCCCC

Properties
Chemical formula	C_{10}H_{22}
Molar mass	142.286 g·mol^{−1}
Appearance	Colorless liquid
Odor	Gasoline-like (in high concentrations)
Density	0.730 g mL^{−1}
Melting point	−30.5 to −29.2 °C; −22.8 to −20.6 °F; 242.7 to 243.9 K
Boiling point	173.8 to 174.4 °C; 344.7 to 345.8 °F; 446.9 to 447.5 K
log P	5.802
Vapor pressure	195 Pa
Henry's law constant (k_{H})	2.1 nmol Pa^{−1} kg^{−1}
Magnetic susceptibility (χ)	−119.74·10^{−6} cm^{3}/mol
Thermal conductivity	0.1381 W m^{−1} K^{−1} (300 K)
Refractive index (n_{D})	1.411–1.412
Viscosity	0.850 mPa·s (25 °C); 0.920 mPa·s (20 °C)

Thermochemistry
Heat capacity (C)	315.46 J K^{−1} mol^{−1}
Std molar entropy (S^{⦵}_{298})	425.89 J K^{−1} mol^{−1}
Std enthalpy of formation (Δ_{f}H^{⦵}_{298})	−302.1 – −299.9 kJ mol^{−1}
Std enthalpy of combustion (Δ_{c}H^{⦵}_{298})	−6779.21 – −6777.45 kJ mol^{−1}

Hazards
- Occupational safety and health (OHS/OSH)
Main hazards	Flammable, moderately toxic
- GHS labelling
Pictograms	(GHS02: Flammable) (GHS08: Health hazard)
Signal word	Danger
Hazard statements	H226, H302, H304, H305
Precautionary statements	P301+P310, P331
NFPA 704 (fire diamond)	1 2 0
Flash point	46.0 °C (114.8 °F; 319.1 K)
Autoignition temperature	210.0 °C (410.0 °F; 483.1 K)
Explosive limits	0.8–2.6%
- Lethal dose or concentration (LD, LC)
LD_{50} (median dose)	>2 g kg^{−1} (dermal, rabbit); 601 mg/kg^{−1} (oral, rat)
Safety data sheet (SDS)	hazard.com

Related compounds
Related alkanes	Nonane; Undecane
- Except where otherwise noted, data are given for materials in their standard state (at 25 °C [77 °F], 100 kPa). verify (what is ?) Infobox references

Decane is an alkane hydrocarbon with the chemical formula C_{10}H_{22}. Although 75 structural isomers are possible for decane, the term usually refers to the normal-decane ("n-decane"), with the formula CH_{3}(CH_{2})_{8}CH_{3}. All isomers, however, exhibit similar properties and little attention is paid to the composition. These isomers are flammable liquids. Decane is present in small quantities (less than 1%) in gasoline (petrol) and kerosene. Like other alkanes, it is a nonpolar solvent, and does not dissolve in water, and is readily combustible. Although it is a component of fuels, it is of little importance as a chemical feedstock, unlike a handful of other alkanes.

== Reactions ==
Decane undergoes combustion, just like other alkanes. In the presence of sufficient oxygen, it burns to form water and carbon dioxide.

2 C_{10}H_{22} + 31 O_{2} → 20 CO_{2} + 22 H_{2}O

With insufficient oxygen, carbon monoxide is also formed.

It can be manufactured in the laboratory without fossil fuels.

== Physical properties ==
It has a surface tension of 0.0238 N·m^{−1}.

== See also ==
- Higher alkanes
- List of isomers of decane
