= Buckminsterfullerene =

Cage-like allotrope of carbon

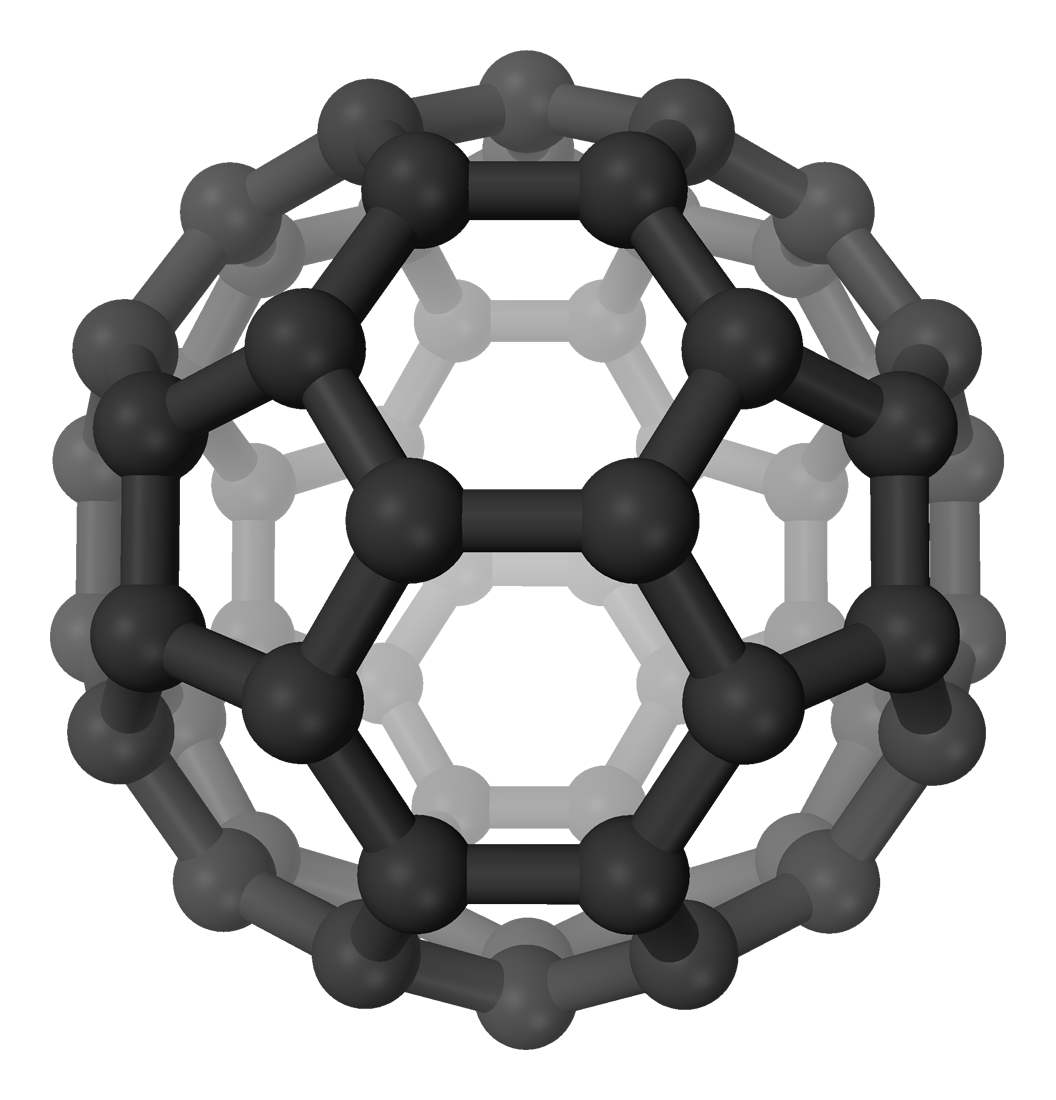

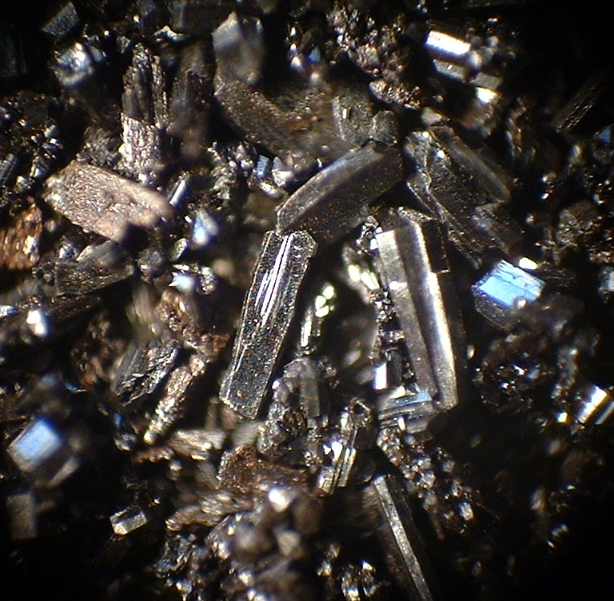

Names
| Pronunciation | /ˌbʌkmɪnstərˈfʊləriːn/ |
- Preferred IUPAC name (C_{60}-I_{h})[5,6]fullerene
- Other names Buckyballs; Fullerene-C_{60}; [60]fullerene

Identifiers
| CAS Number | 99685-96-8 |
| 3D model (JSmol) | Interactive image |
| Beilstein Reference | 5901022 |
| ChEBI | CHEBI:33128 |
| ChemSpider | 110185 |
| ECHA InfoCard | 100.156.884 |
| PubChem CID | 123591 |
| UNII | NP9U26B839 |
| CompTox Dashboard (EPA) | DTXSID4031772 |
- InChI: InChI=1S/C60/c1-2-5-6-3(1)8-12-10-4(1)9-11-7(2)17-21-13(5)23-24-14(6)22-18(8)28-20(12)30-26-16(10)15(9)25-29-19(11)27(17)37-41-31(21)33(23)43-44-34(24)32(22)42-38(28)48-40(30)46-36(26)35(25)45-39(29)47(37)55-49(41)51(43)57-52(44)50(42)56(48)59-54(46)53(45)58(55)60(57)59 Key: XMWRBQBLMFGWIX-UHFFFAOYSA-N; InChI=1/C60/c1-2-5-6-3(1)8-12-10-4(1)9-11-7(2)17-21-13(5)23-24-14(6)22-18(8)28-20(12)30-26-16(10)15(9)25-29-19(11)27(17)37-41-31(21)33(23)43-44-34(24)32(22)42-38(28)48-40(30)46-36(26)35(25)45-39(29)47(37)55-49(41)51(43)57-52(44)50(42)56(48)59-54(46)53(45)58(55)60(57)59 Key: XMWRBQBLMFGWIX-UHFFFAOYAU; InChI=1S/C60/c1-2-5-6-3(1)8-12-10-4(1)9-11-7(2)17-21-13(5)23-24-14(6)22-18(8)28-20(12)30-26-16(10)15(9)25-29-19(11)27(17)37-41-31(21)33(23)43-44-34(24)32(22)42-38(28)48-40(30)46-36(26)35(25)45-39(29)47(37)55-49(41)51(43)57-52(44)50(42)56(48)59-54(46)53(45)58(55)60(57)59 Key: XMWRBQBLMFGWIX-UHFFFAOYSA-N
- SMILES: c12c3c4c5c2c2c6c7c1c1c8c3c3c9c4c4c%10c5c5c2c2c6c6c%11c7c1c1c7c8c3c3c8c9c4c4c9c%10c5c5c2c2c6c6c%11c1c1c7c3c3c8c4c4c9c5c2c2c6c1c3c42

Properties
| Chemical formula | C_{60} |
| Molar mass | 720.660 g·mol^{−1} |
| Appearance | Dark needle-like crystals |
| Density | 1.65 g/cm^{3} |
| Solubility in water | insoluble in water |
| Vapor pressure | 0.4–0.5 Pa (T ≈ 800 K); 14 Pa (T ≈ 900 K) |

Structure
| Crystal structure | Face-centered cubic, cF1924 |
| Space group | Fm3̅m, No. 225 |
| Lattice constant | a = 1.4154 nm |

Hazards
- GHS labelling
| Pictograms | (GHS07: Exclamation mark) |
| Signal word | Warning |
| Hazard statements | H315, H319, H335 |
| Precautionary statements | P261, P264, P271, P280, P302+P352, P304+P340, P305+P351+P338, P312, P321, P332+P313, P337+P313, P362, P403+P233, P405, P501 |
- Except where otherwise noted, data are given for materials in their standard state (at 25 °C [77 °F], 100 kPa). verify (what is ?) Infobox references

Buckminsterfullerene is a type of fullerene with the formula C_{60}. It has a cage-like fused-ring structure (truncated icosahedron) made of twenty hexagons and twelve pentagons, and resembles an association football. Each of its 60 carbon atoms is bonded to its three neighbors.

Buckminsterfullerene is a black solid that dissolves in hydrocarbon solvents to produce a purple solution. The substance was discovered in 1985 and has received intense study, although few real world applications have been found.

Molecules of buckminsterfullerene (or of fullerenes in general) are commonly nicknamed buckyballs.

== Occurrence ==
Buckminsterfullerene is the most common naturally occurring fullerene. Small quantities of it can be found in soot.

It also exists in space. Neutral C_{60} has been observed in planetary nebulae and several types of star. The ionised form, C^{+}_{60}, has been identified in the interstellar medium, where it is the cause of several absorption features known as diffuse interstellar bands in the near-infrared.

== History ==
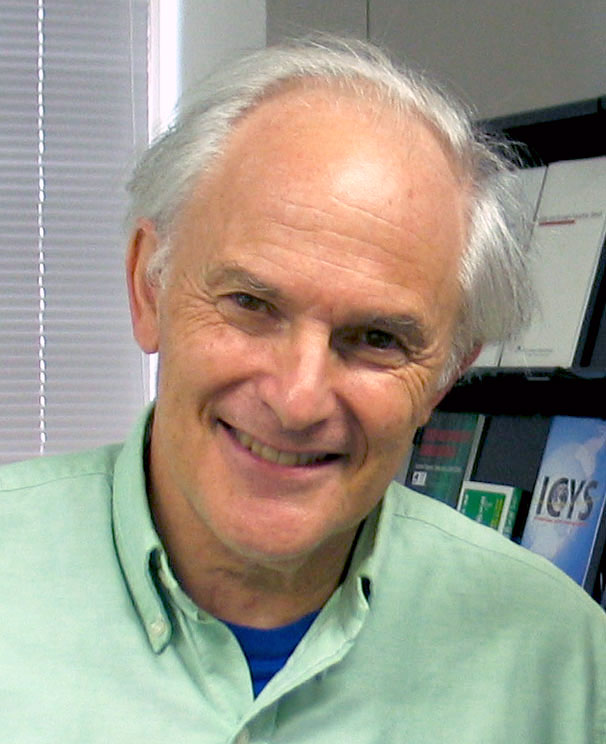
Harold Kroto

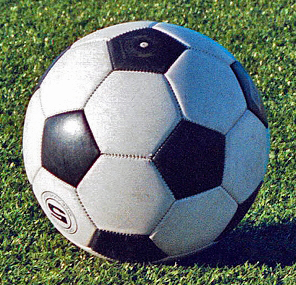
Many footballs have the same arrangement of polygons as buckminsterfullerene, C_{60}.

Theoretical predictions of buckminsterfullerene molecules appeared in the late 1960s and early 1970s. It was first generated in 1984 by Eric Rohlfing, Donald Cox, and Andrew Kaldor, using a laser to vaporize carbon in a supersonic helium beam, although the group did not realize that buckminsterfullerene had been produced. In 1985 their work was repeated by Harold Kroto, James R. Heath, Sean C. O'Brien, Robert Curl, and Richard Smalley at Rice University, who recognized the structure of C_{60} as buckminsterfullerene.

Concurrent but unconnected to the Kroto-Smalley work, astrophysicists were working with spectroscopists to study infrared emissions from giant red carbon stars. Smalley and team were able to use a laser vaporization technique to create carbon clusters which could potentially emit infrared at the same wavelength as had been emitted by the red carbon star. Hence, the inspiration came to Smalley and team to use the laser technique on graphite to generate fullerenes.

Using laser evaporation of graphite the Smalley team found C_{n} clusters (where n > 20 and even) of which the most common were C_{60} and C_{70}. A solid rotating graphite disk was used as the surface from which carbon was vaporized using a laser beam creating hot plasma that was then passed through a stream of high-density helium gas. The carbon species were subsequently cooled and ionized resulting in the formation of clusters. Clusters ranged in molecular masses, but Kroto and Smalley found predominance in a C_{60} cluster that could be enhanced further by allowing the plasma to react longer. They also discovered that C_{60} is a cage-like molecule, a regular truncated icosahedron.

The experimental evidence, a strong peak at 720 daltons, indicated that a carbon molecule with 60 carbon atoms was forming, but provided no structural information. The research group concluded after reactivity experiments, that the most likely structure was a spheroidal molecule. The idea was quickly rationalized as the basis of an icosahedral symmetry closed cage structure.

Kroto, Curl, and Smalley were awarded the 1996 Nobel Prize in Chemistry for their roles in the discovery of buckminsterfullerene and the related class of molecules, the fullerenes.

In 1989 physicists Wolfgang Krätschmer, Konstantinos Fostiropoulos, and Donald R. Huffman observed unusual optical absorptions in thin films of carbon dust (soot). The soot had been generated by an arc-process between two graphite electrodes in a helium atmosphere where the electrode material evaporates and condenses forming soot in the quenching atmosphere. Among other features, the IR spectra of the soot showed four discrete bands in close agreement to those proposed for C_{60}.

Another paper on the characterization and verification of the molecular structure followed on in the same year (1990) from their thin film experiments, and detailed also the extraction of an evaporable as well as benzene-soluble material from the arc-generated soot. This extract had TEM and X-ray crystal analysis consistent with arrays of spherical C_{60} molecules, approximately 1.0 nm in van der Waals diameter as well as the expected molecular mass of 720 Da for C_{60} (and 840 Da for C_{70}) in their mass spectra. The method was simple and efficient to prepare the material in gram amounts per day (1990) which has boosted the fullerene research and is even today applied for the commercial production of fullerenes.

The discovery of practical routes to C_{60} led to the exploration of a new field of chemistry involving the study of fullerenes.

=== Etymology ===
The discoverers of the allotrope named the newfound molecule after American architect R. Buckminster Fuller, who designed many geodesic dome structures that look similar to C_{60} and who had died in 1983, the year before discovery. Another common name for buckminsterfullerene is "buckyballs".

== Synthesis ==
Soot is produced by laser ablation of graphite or pyrolysis of aromatic hydrocarbons. Fullerenes are extracted from the soot with organic solvents using a Soxhlet extractor. This step yields a solution containing up to 75% of C_{60}, as well as other fullerenes. These fractions are separated using chromatography. Generally, the fullerenes are dissolved in a hydrocarbon or halogenated hydrocarbon and separated using alumina columns.

Synthesis using the techniques of "classical organic chemistry" is possible, but not economic.

== Structure ==
Buckminsterfullerene is a truncated icosahedron with 60 vertices, 32 faces (20 hexagons and 12 pentagons where no pentagons share a vertex), and 90 edges (60 edges between 5-membered & 6-membered rings and 30 edges are shared between 6-membered & 6-membered rings), with a carbon atom at the vertices of each polygon and a bond along each polygon edge. The van der Waals diameter of a C_{60} molecule is about 1.01 nanometers (nm). The nucleus to nucleus diameter of a C_{60} molecule is about 0.71 nm. The C_{60} molecule has two bond lengths. The 6:6 ring bonds (between two hexagons) can be considered "double bonds" and are shorter than the 6:5 bonds (between a hexagon and a pentagon). Its average bond length is 0.14 nm. Each carbon atom in the structure is bonded covalently with three others. A carbon atom in the C_{60} can be substituted by a nitrogen or boron atom yielding a C_{59}N or C_{59}B respectively.

Energy level diagram for C_{60} under "ideal" spherical (left) and "real" icosahedral symmetry (right).

== Properties ==
Orthogonal projections
| Centered by | Vertex | Edge 5–6 | Edge 6–6 | Face Hexagon | Face Pentagon |
|---|---|---|---|---|---|
| Image | | | | | |
| Projective symmetry | [2] | [2] | [2] | [6] | [10] |

For a time buckminsterfullerene was the largest known molecule observed to exhibit wave–particle duality. In 2020 the dye molecule phthalocyanine exhibited the duality that is more famously attributed to light, electrons and other small particles and molecules.

=== Solution ===
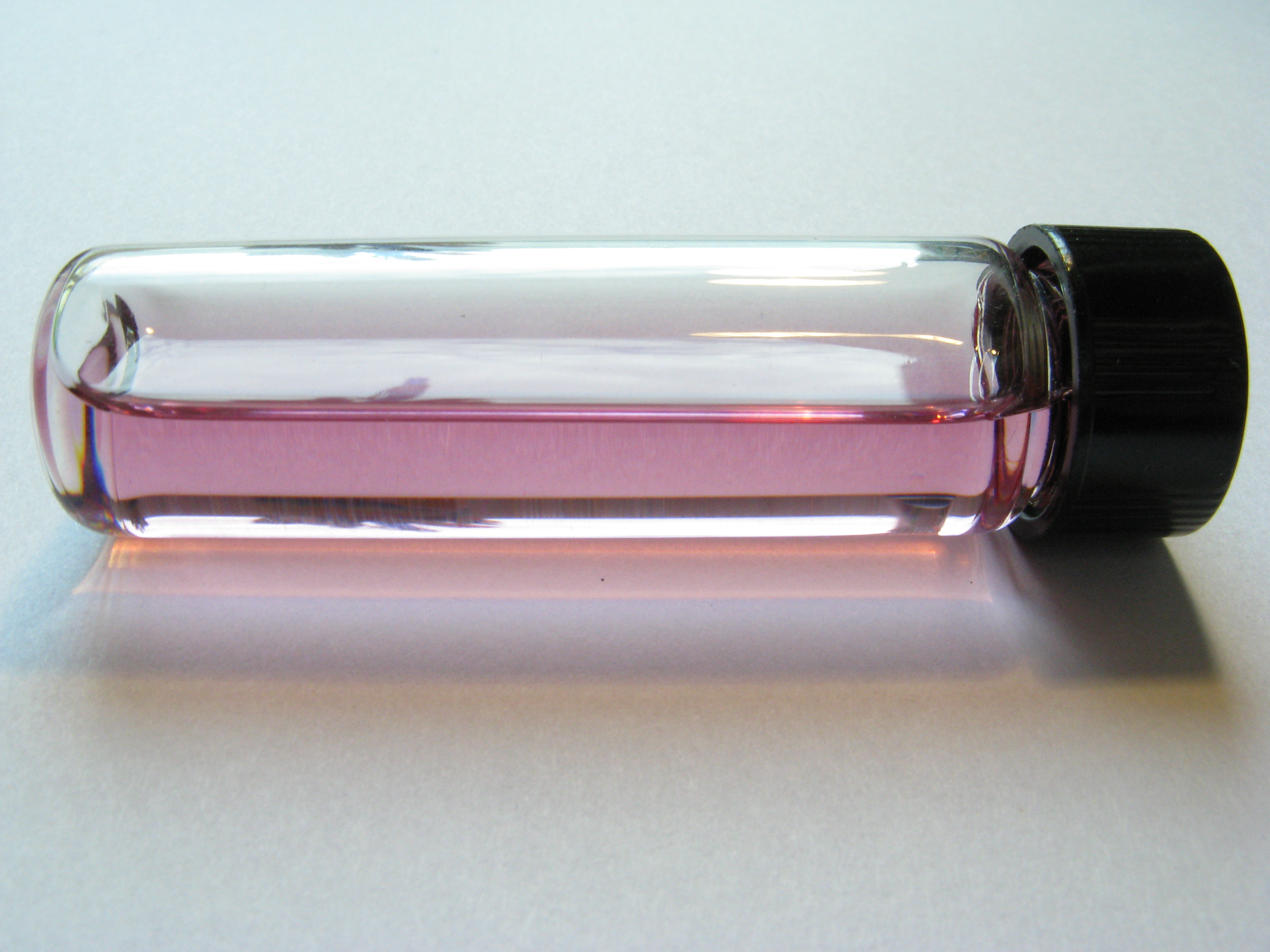
Dilute solution of C_{60} in an aromatic solvent

Solubility of C_{60}
| Solvent | Solubility (g/L) |
|---|---|
| 1-chloronaphthalene | 51 |
| 1-methylnaphthalene | 33 |
| 1,2-dichlorobenzene | 24 |
| 1,2,4-trimethylbenzene | 18 |
| tetrahydronaphthalene | 16 |
| carbon disulfide | 8 |
| 1,2,3-tribromopropane | 8 |
| xylene | 5 |
| bromoform | 5 |
| cumene | 4 |
| toluene | 3 |
| benzene | 1.5 |
| carbon tetrachloride | 0.447 |
| chloroform | 0.25 |
| hexane | 0.046 |
| cyclohexane | 0.035 |
| tetrahydrofuran | 0.006 |
| acetonitrile | 0.004 |
| methanol | 0.00004 |
| water | 1.3 × 10^{−11} |
| pentane | 0.004 |
| octane | 0.025 |
| isooctane | 0.026 |
| decane | 0.070 |
| dodecane | 0.091 |
| tetradecane | 0.126 |
| dioxane | 0.0041 |
| mesitylene | 0.997 |
| dichloromethane | 0.254 |

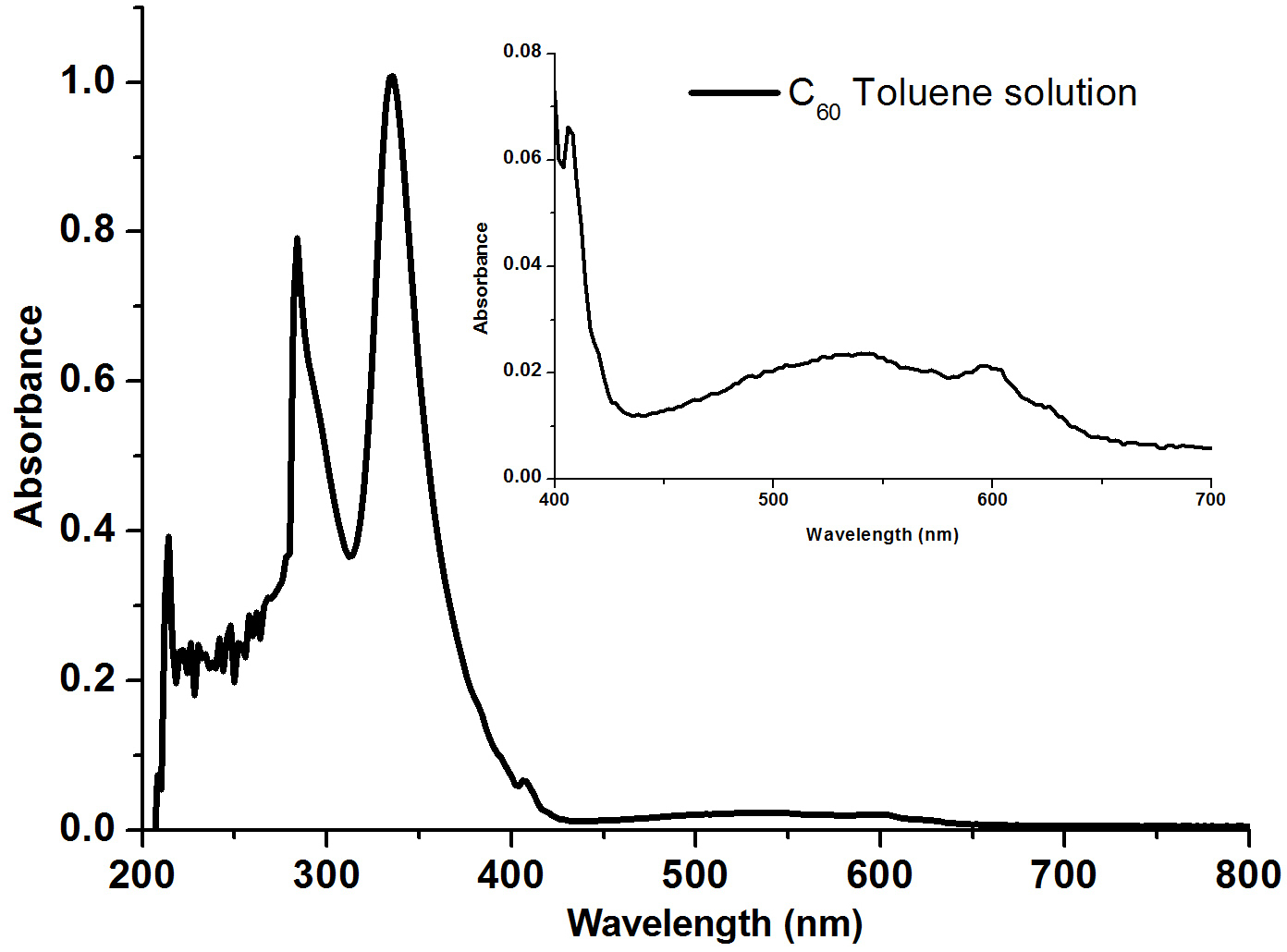
Optical absorption spectrum of C_{60} solution, showing diminished absorption for the blue (~450 nm) and red (~700 nm) light that results in the purple color.

Fullerenes are sparingly soluble in aromatic solvents and carbon disulfide, but insoluble in water. Solutions of pure C_{60} have a deep purple color which leaves a brown residue upon evaporation. The reason for this color change is the relatively narrow energy width of the band of molecular levels responsible for green light absorption by individual C_{60} molecules. Thus individual molecules transmit some blue and red light resulting in a purple color. Upon drying, intermolecular interaction results in the overlap and broadening of the energy bands, thereby eliminating the blue light transmittance and causing the purple to brown color change.

C_{60} crystallises with some solvents in the lattice ("solvates"). For example, crystallization of C_{60} from benzene solution yields triclinic crystals with the formula C_{60}·_{4}C_{6}H_{6}. Like other solvates, this one readily releases benzene to give the usual face-centred cubic C_{60}. Millimeter-sized crystals of C_{60} and C_{70} can be grown from solution both for solvates and for pure fullerenes.

=== Solid ===
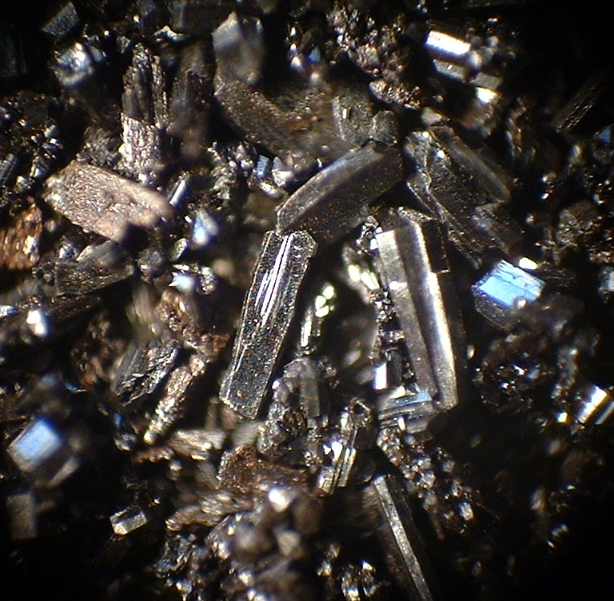
Micrograph of C_{60}.

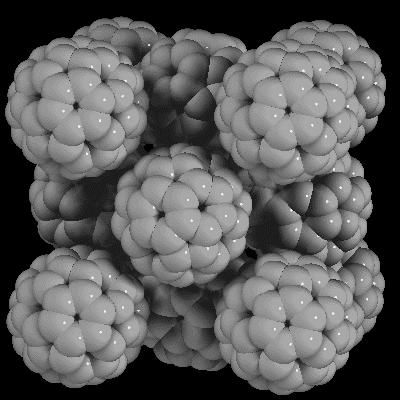
Packing of C_{60} in crystal.

In solid buckminsterfullerene, the C_{60} molecules adopt the fcc (face-centered cubic) motif. They start rotating at about −20 °C. This change is associated with a first-order phase transition to an fcc structure and a small, yet abrupt increase in the lattice constant from 1.411 to 1.4154 nm.

C_{60} solid is as soft as graphite, but when compressed to less than 70% of its volume it transforms into a superhard form of diamond (see aggregated diamond nanorod). C_{60} films and solution have strong non-linear optical properties; in particular, their optical absorption increases with light intensity (saturable absorption).

C_{60} forms a brownish solid with an optical absorption threshold at ≈1.6 eV. It is an n-type semiconductor with a low activation energy of 0.1–0.3 eV; this conductivity is attributed to intrinsic or oxygen-related defects. Fcc C_{60} contains voids at its octahedral and tetrahedral sites which are sufficiently large (0.6 and 0.2 nm respectively) to accommodate impurity atoms. When alkali metals are doped into these voids, C_{60} converts from a semiconductor into a conductor or even superconductor.

== Chemical reactions and properties ==
C_{60} undergoes six reversible, one-electron reductions, ultimately generating C^{6−}_{60}. Its oxidation is irreversible. The first reduction occurs at ≈−1.0 V (Fc/Fc^{+}), showing that C_{60} is a reluctant electron acceptor. C_{60} tends to avoid having double bonds in the pentagonal rings, which makes electron delocalization poor, and results in C_{60} not being "superaromatic". C_{60} behaves like an electron deficient alkene. For example, it reacts with some nucleophiles.

=== Hydrogenation ===
C_{60} exhibits a small degree of aromatic character, but it still reflects localized double and single C–C bond characters. Therefore, C_{60} can undergo addition with hydrogen to give polyhydrofullerenes. C_{60} also undergoes Birch reduction. For example, C_{60} reacts with lithium in liquid ammonia, followed by tert-butanol to give a mixture of polyhydrofullerenes such as C_{60}H_{18}, C_{60}H_{32}, C_{60}H_{36}, with C_{60}H_{32} being the dominating product. This mixture of polyhydrofullerenes can be re-oxidized by 2,3-dichloro-5,6-dicyano-1,4-benzoquinone to give C_{60} again.

A selective hydrogenation method exists. Reaction of C_{60} with 9,9′,10,10′-dihydroanthracene under the same conditions, depending on the time of reaction, gives C_{60}H_{32} and C_{60}H_{18} respectively and selectively.

=== Halogenation ===
Addition of fluorine, chlorine, and bromine occurs for C_{60}. Fluorine atoms are small enough for a 1,2-addition, while Cl_{2} and Br_{2} add to remote C atoms due to steric factors. For example, in C_{60}Br_{8} and C_{60}Br_{24}, the Br atoms are in 1,3- or 1,4-positions with respect to each other. Under various conditions a vast number of halogenated derivatives of C_{60} can be produced, some with an extraordinary selectivity on one or two isomers over the other possible ones. Addition of fluorine and chlorine usually results in a flattening of the C_{60} framework into a drum-shaped molecule.

=== Addition of oxygen atoms ===
Solutions of C_{60} can be oxygenated to the epoxide C_{60}O. Ozonation of C_{60} in 1,2-xylene at 257K gives an intermediate ozonide C_{60}O_{3}, which can be decomposed into 2 forms of C_{60}O. Decomposition of C_{60}O_{3} at 296 K gives the epoxide, but photolysis gives a product in which the O atom bridges a 5,6-edge.

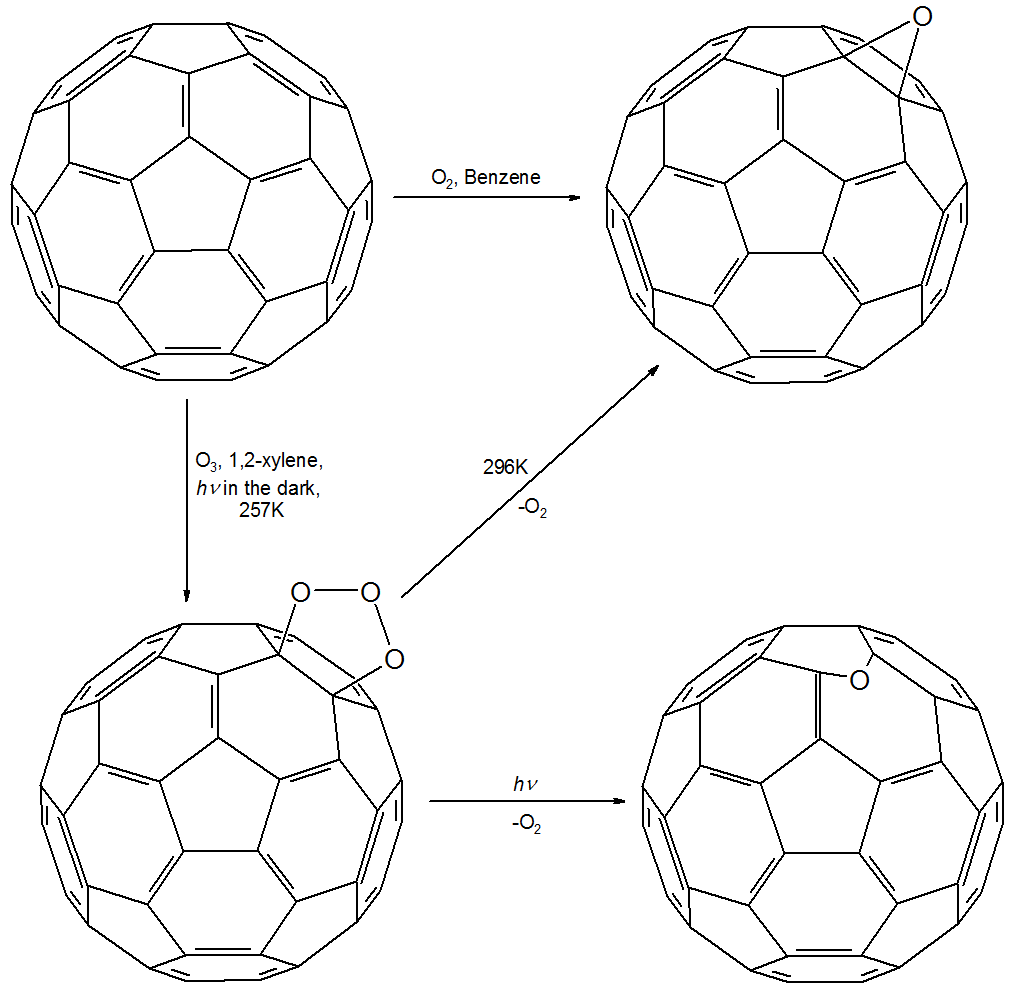

=== Cycloadditions ===
The Diels–Alder reaction is commonly employed to functionalize C_{60}. Reaction of C_{60} with appropriate substituted diene gives the corresponding adduct.

The Diels–Alder reaction between C_{60} and 3,6-diaryl-1,2,4,5-tetrazines affordsC_{62}. The C_{62} has the structure in which a four-membered ring is surrounded by four six-membered rings.

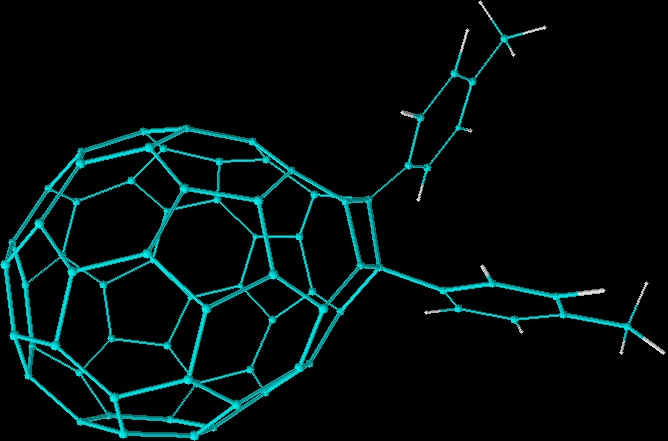
A C_{62} derivative [C_{62}(C_{6}H_{5}-_{4}-Me)_{2}] synthesized from C_{60} and 3,6-bis(4-methylphenyl)-3,6-dihydro-1,2,4,5-tetrazine

The C_{60} molecules can also be coupled through a [2+2] cycloaddition, giving the dumbbell-shaped compound C_{120}. The coupling is achieved by high-speed vibrating milling of C_{60} with a catalytic amount of KCN. The reaction is reversible as C_{120} dissociates back to two C_{60} molecules when heated at 450 K (177 °C; 350 °F). Under high pressure and temperature, repeated [2+2] cycloaddition between C_{60} results in polymerized fullerene chains and networks. These polymers remain stable at ambient pressure and temperature once formed, and have remarkably interesting electronic and magnetic properties, such as being ferromagnetic above room temperature.

=== Free radical reactions ===
Reactions of C_{60} with free radicals readily occur. When C_{60} is mixed with a disulfide RSSR, the radical C_{60}SR• forms spontaneously upon irradiation of the mixture.

Stability of the radical species C_{60}Y^{•} depends largely on steric factors of Y. When tert-butyl halide is photolyzed and allowed to react with C_{60}, a reversible inter-cage C–C bond is formed:

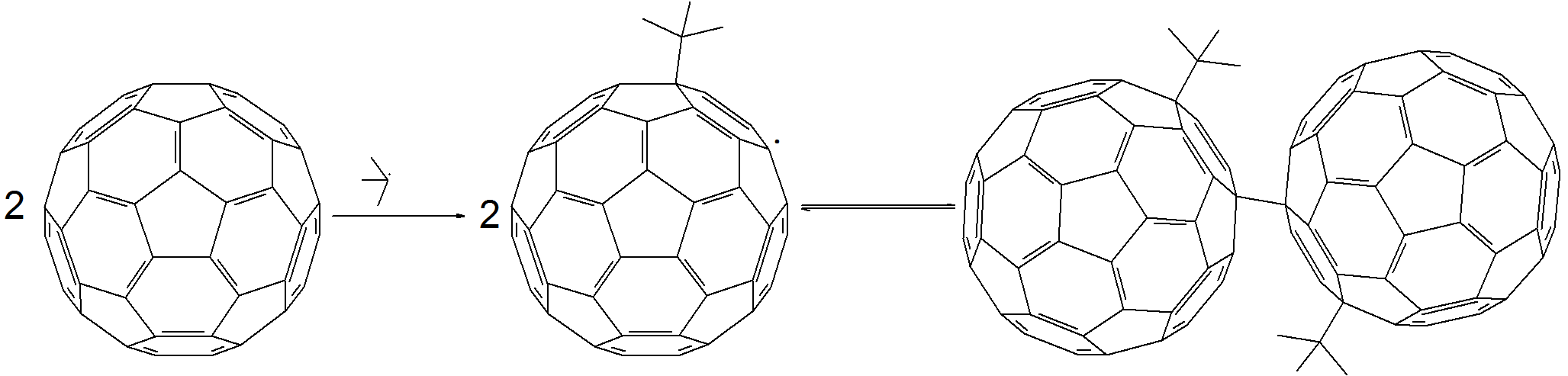

=== Cyclopropanation (Bingel reaction) ===
Cyclopropanation (the Bingel reaction) is another common method for functionalizing C_{60}. Cyclopropanation of C_{60} mostly occurs at the junction of 2 hexagons due to steric factors.

The first cyclopropanation was carried out by treating the β-bromomalonate with C_{60} in the presence of a base. Cyclopropanation also occur readily with diazomethanes. For example, diphenyldiazomethane reacts readily with C_{60} to give the compound C_{61}Ph_{2}. Phenyl-C_{61}-butyric acid methyl ester derivative prepared through cyclopropanation has been studied for use in organic solar cells.

=== Redox reactions ===
==== C_{60} anions ====
The LUMO in C_{60} is triply degenerate, with the HOMO–LUMO separation relatively small. This small gap suggests that reduction of C_{60} should occur at mild potentials leading to fulleride anions, [C_{60}]^{n}^{−} (n = 1–6). The midpoint potentials of 1-electron reduction of buckminsterfullerene and its anions is given in the table below:

Reduction potential of C_{60} at 213 K
| Half-reaction | E° (V) |
|---|---|
| C_{60} + e^{−} ⇌ C^{−}_{60} | −0.169 |
| C^{−}_{60} + e^{−} ⇌ C^{2−}_{60} | −0.599 |
| C^{2−}_{60} + e^{−} ⇌ C^{3−}_{60} | −1.129 |
| C^{3−}_{60} + e^{−} ⇌ C^{4−}_{60} | −1.579 |
| C^{4−}_{60} + e^{−} ⇌ C^{5−}_{60} | −2.069 |
| C^{5−}_{60} + e^{−} ⇌ C^{6−}_{60} | −2.479 |

C_{60} forms a variety of charge-transfer complexes, for example with tetrakis(dimethylamino)ethylene:

C_{60} + C_{2}(NMe_{2})_{4} → [C_{2}(NMe_{2})_{4}]^{+}[C_{60}]^{−}

This salt exhibits ferromagnetism at 16 K.

==== C_{60} cations ====
C_{60} oxidizes with difficulty. Three reversible oxidation processes have been observed by using cyclic voltammetry with ultra-dry methylene chloride and a supporting electrolyte with extremely high oxidation resistance and low nucleophilicity, such as [^{n}Bu_{4}N][AsF_{6}].

Reduction potentials of C_{60} oxidation at low temperatures
| Half-reaction | E° (V) |
|---|---|
| C_{60} ⇌ C^{+}_{60} | +1.27 |
| C^{+}_{60} ⇌ C^{2+}_{60} | +1.71 |
| C^{2+}_{60} ⇌ C^{3+}_{60} | +2.14 |

=== Metal complexes ===
C_{60} forms complexes akin to the more common alkenes. Complexes have been reported molybdenum, tungsten, platinum, palladium, iridium, and titanium. The pentacarbonyl species are produced by photochemical reactions.

M(CO)_{6} + C_{60} → M(η^{2}-C_{60})(CO)_{5} + CO (M = Mo, W)

In the case of platinum complex, the labile ethylene ligand is the leaving group in a thermal reaction:

Pt(η^{2}-C_{2}H_{4})(PPh_{3})_{2} + C_{60} → Pt(η^{2}-C_{60})(PPh_{3})_{2} + C_{2}H_{4}

Titanocene complexes have also been reported:

(η^{5}-Cp)_{2}Ti(η^{2}-(CH_{3})_{3}SiC≡CSi(CH_{3})_{3}) + C_{60} → (η^{5}-Cp)_{2}Ti(η^{2}-C_{60}) + (CH_{3})_{3}SiC≡CSi(CH_{3})_{3}

Coordinatively unsaturated precursors, such as Vaska's complex, for adducts with C_{60}:

trans-Ir(CO)Cl(PPh_{3})_{2} + C_{60} → Ir(CO)Cl(η^{2}-C_{60})(PPh_{3})_{2}

One such iridium complex, [Ir(η^{2}-C_{60})(CO)Cl(Ph_{2}CH_{2}C_{6}H_{4}OCH_{2}Ph)_{2}] has been prepared where the metal center projects two electron-rich 'arms' that embrace the C_{60} guest.

=== Endohedral fullerenes ===
Metal atoms or certain small molecules such as H_{2} and noble gas can be encapsulated inside the C_{60} cage. These endohedral fullerenes are usually synthesized by doping in the metal atoms in an arc reactor or by laser evaporation. These methods gives low yields of endohedral fullerenes, and a better method involves the opening of the cage, packing in the atoms or molecules, and closing the opening using certain organic reactions. This method, however, is still immature and only a few species have been synthesized this way.

Endohedral fullerenes show distinct and intriguing chemical properties that can be completely different from the encapsulated atom or molecule, as well as the fullerene itself. The encapsulated atoms have been shown to perform circular motions inside the C_{60} cage, and their motion has been followed using NMR spectroscopy.

== Boron fullerenes ==
Predictions of boron fullerenes began in 2007 when researchers Nevill Szwacki, Arta Sadrzadeh, and Boris Yakobson from Rice University proposed a stable cage of 80 boron atoms with the same structure as C_{60} but with an additional boron atom at the center of each hexagon. The existence of the B_{80} fullerene was debated, as subsequent density functional theory calculations found it to be significantly less stable than other configurations of 80 boron atoms; this may be due to errors in the calculated bond lengths. A smaller configuration of 40 boron atoms (borospherene) was observed in 2014, however it lacked the icosahedral symmetry of C_{60}.

The B_{80} buckyball was first observed in 2026 by a team led by Lai-Sheng Wang at Brown University, using a laser to vaporize a boron target in a helium carrier gas mixed with argon to cool the resulting clusters. The photoelectron spectrum of the B_{80}^{−} anion showed a few sharp peaks, indicating a symmetric structure. Of the candidate structures, only the simulated spectrum of the buckyball agreed with the experimental result.

== Potential applications ==
=== In technology ===
The optical absorption properties of C_{60} match the solar spectrum in a way that suggests that C_{60}-based films could be useful for photovoltaic applications. Because of its high electronic affinity it is one of the most common electron acceptors used in donor/acceptor based solar cells. Conversion efficiencies up to 5.7% have been reported in C_{60}–polymer cells.

=== In health ===
==== Ingestion and risks ====
C_{60} is sensitive to light, so leaving C_{60} under light exposure causes it to degrade, becoming dangerous. The ingestion of C_{60} solutions that have been exposed to light could lead to developing cancer (tumors). So the management of C_{60} products for human ingestion requires cautionary measures such as: elaboration in very dark environments, encasing into bottles of great opacity, and storing in dark places, and others like consumption under low light conditions and using labels to warn about the problems with light.

Otherwise, a study found that C_{60} remains in the body for a longer time than usual, especially in the liver, where it tends to be accumulated, and therefore has the potential to induce detrimental health effects.

==== Oils with C60 and risks ====
C_{60} in olive oil administered to mice resulted in no extension in lifespan. C_{60} in olive oil administered to beagle dogs resulted in a large reduction of C-reactive protein, which is commonly elevated in cardiovascular disease and cerebrovascular disease.

Many oils with C_{60} have been sold as antioxidant products, but it does not avoid the problem of their sensitivity to light, that can turn them toxic. A later research confirmed that exposure to light degrades solutions of C_{60} in oil, making it toxic and leading to a "massive" increase of the risk of developing cancer (tumors) after its consumption.

To avoid the degradation by effect of light, C_{60} oils must be made in very dark environments, encased into bottles of great opacity, and kept in darkness, consumed under low light conditions and accompanied by labels to warn about the dangers of light for C_{60}.

Some producers have been able to dissolve C_{60} in water to avoid possible problems with oils, but that would not protect C_{60} from light, so the same cautions are needed.

== Bibliography ==
- Katz, E.A. (2006). "Fullerene Thin Films as Photovoltaic Material". In Sōga, Tetsuo (ed.). Nanostructured materials for solar energy conversion. Elsevier. pp. 361–443. ISBN 978-0-444-52844-5.
