= Konstantinos Fostiropoulos =

Greek physicist

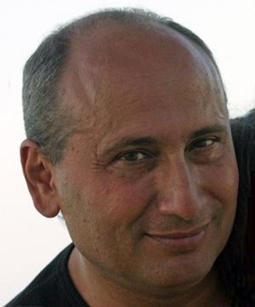
- Born: 20 June 1960 (age 66); Krya Vrysi, Pella, Greece
- Education: Heidelberg University
- Known for: Organic photovoltaics; Buckminsterfullerene; (12,472 citations, h-index 24)
- Scientific career
- Fields: Physics
- Workplaces: Helmholtz-Zentrum Berlin, GMD-Forschungszentrum Informationstechnik, Max Planck Institute for Nuclear Physics, Heidelberg University – Institute of Physical Chemistry.
- Thesis: "C_{60} – a new form of carbon" (1989–1992)

Konstantinos Fostiropoulos is a Greek physicist who had been working in Germany in the areas solid-state physics, molecular physics, astrophysics, and thermodynamics. From 2003 to 2016 he has been founder and head of the Organic Solar Cells Group at the Institute Heterogeneous Materials Systems within the Helmholtz-Zentrum Berlin. His scientific works include novel energy materials and photovoltaic device concepts, carbon clusters in the Interstellar Medium, and intermolecular forces of real gases.

In 1989 Fostiropoulos was the first to synthesize C_{60}, a molecular carbon modification, in preparative amounts by a specifically developed vacuum process. After the discovery of the molecule 1985 by Kroto et al., Fostiropoulos' work contributed essentially to the establishment of fundamental fullerene research as well as its applications.
In 2001/2002 he presented a bilayer heterojunction concept for organic photovoltaic devices applying vacuum processes for the formation of a molecular absorber layer consisting of Zn phthalocyanine and C_{60} molecules.

He has also been an expert in distance education who demonstrated in 1999 an experimental low band width connectivity transatlantic internet teaching platform. On the occasion of the corona crisis, he set up a platform capable of hosting the virtual part of large hybrid scientific conferences.

== Personal life ==
=== Migration ===
Fostiropoulos was born 20 June 1960 in Krya Vrysi, Pella, Greece, to Anastasios Fostiropoulos and Lemonia Fostiropoulou (née Atmatzidou) the second of three children (Niko, Kosta, Eleni). In 1961 his father emigrated to Mannheim, Germany, where later his wife followed with their two sons when Fostiropoulos was four years old. The family settled in Mannheim-Neckarstadt, very close to its landmark "Alte Feuerwache" (Old Fire Station), which at that time was still the city's main fire station. There, during his primary school years, Fostiropoulos gained insight into the work of the local fire brigade (fire extinguishing, first aid measures...).
Five years later his sister Eleni was born. Until they retired his parents Anastasios and Lemonia had been working as labourer and cleaner, respectively. In 2015 they re-immigrated in Greece, together with his sister Eleni and her family. His brother Niko was elected to the city council of Karlsruhe, Germany from 2000 to 2019, and has been the founder and owner of the centre for further education alfatraining since 2005.

=== Marriage ===
During his time as research fellow at the Institut für Medienkommunikation (IMK) of the former GMD-Forschungszentrum Informationstechnik in Sankt Augustin near Bonn, Fostiropoulos' relationship to his colleague Simone Lahme, a web designer and specialist for e-learning, began on the occasion of the Total Solar eclipse of August 11, 1999, which they had been observing together in Karlsruhe. They married in 2004 and have two children, Timon and Melina.

== Education ==
In his early years in Mannheim Fostiropoulos graduated from German basic primary Hilda-Schule and secondary Kurpfalzgymnasium Mannheim as well as from Greek afternoon primary school. Moreover, he graduated from the Städtische Musikschule Mannheim where he had attended as a guitarist the plucked instruments class of Takashi Ochi and his Gitarrenchor der Städtischen Musikschule Mannheim.

Fostiropoulos studied physics at the nearby Heidelberg University where he was, particularly, intrigued by the Grand Unified Theory, laser physics and molecular physics. He obtained his Diploma after having joined the research group of Bernhard Schramm, Institute of Physical Chemistry. In February 1989 he attended the "Dust Group" of Hugo Fechtig, Department Cosmophysics at Max Planck Institute for Nuclear Physics, where he worked as doctoral candidate on his thesis "C_{60} – eine neue Form des Kohlenstoffs". In February 1992 he received his Ph.D. from Heidelberg University.

Because of his family's financial constraints he had been working in various jobs during his studies: as classical guitar instructor at Mannheimer Abendakademie, sound engineer for simultaneous translation at Ellerbrock Konferenztechnik, taxi driver in Mannheim, and teaching assistant of Physical Chemistry at Heidelberg University.

== First scientific career – "fundamental research" ==
From 1986–88 Fostiropoulos was investigating effects of intermolecular forces in real gases at the Institute of Physical Chemistry, Heidelberg University. One focus was to study the thermodynamic properties of freons in order to substitute them by environmentally compatible substances in refrigerator units.

=== The historical origin of carbon lamps (1802 – 1960s) ===
carbon lamps by arc (1), contact arc (2) or by resistive heating (3)
A well-known method to generate and study atoms, small clusters and big agglomerates (dust particles) of conductive materials (e.g. graphite, metals...) is to thermally evaporate them from rigid rods under low pressure conditions or vacuum. Thereby, either an arc or contact arc is ignited between two such rods (electrodes), or resistive heating of one rod is applied for its electrical evaporation. Particularly, in the 19. century the element carbon had been studied in detail to develop non-degradable graphite electrodes for intensive carbon arc lamp spot light applications (e.g. in cinema projectors). They were invented by Humphry Davy in 1802 and had been in use for more than a hundred years. In the 1960s those methods were revived in order to study the chemistry of carbon vapours in rare-gas atmospheres (He, Ar...), e.g. by William Weltner jr.

=== The Heidelberg experiments ===
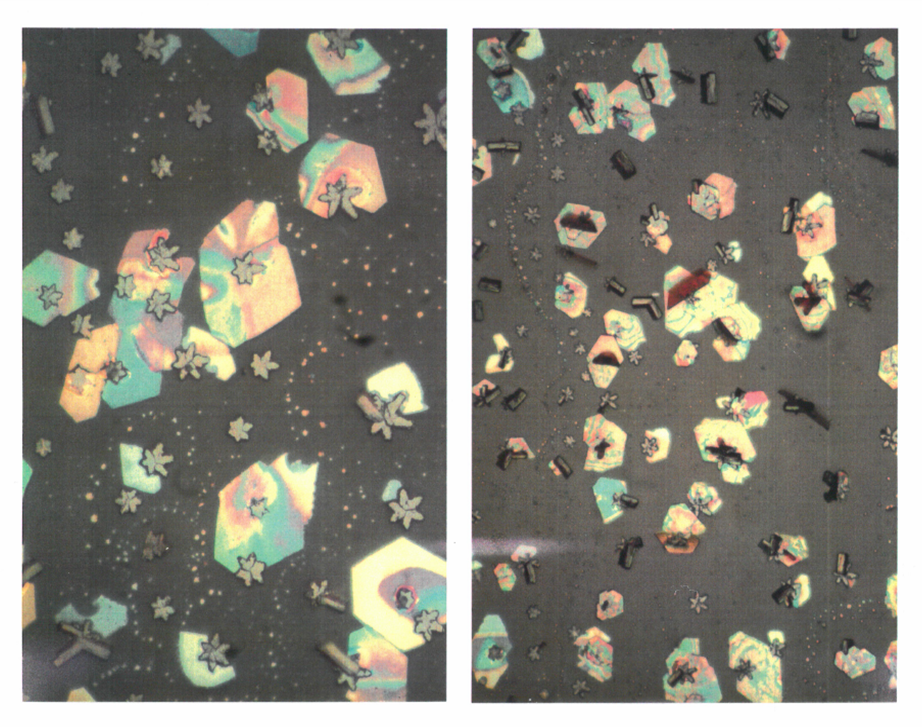
First micro-graphs of fullerene crystals grown from benzene solution. The images were taken through an optical microscope in reflection mode. Flake-lets of some 10 microns in diameter as well as compact hexagonal rods and stars had been identified. (Fostiropoulos, 1990)

In September 1988 a young volunteering student, Bernd Wagner, joined the "Dust Group" of astrophysicist Hugo Fechtig, director at Max Planck Institute for Nuclear Physics (MPIK), for a few weeks. There, under the supervision of Fechtig's assistant Wolfgang Krätschmer Wagner had been performing such carbon vapour experiments using the contact arc method (2) when he accidentally changed the pressure conditions. As a result, he received traces of carbon dust with additional weak IR absorption features unknown to him. However, the result was not considered further, when Wagner left, but was deemed "impurities from pump oil" or simply "junk".
In January 1989 Fostiropoulos joined Fechtig's group, where he picked up the "accidental" experiment. After a few weeks assessment period he decided to study as part of his Ph.D. the three kinds of thermal evaporation processes in detail and, subsequently, he developed new process parameters for each. Accordingly, in 1989 Fostiropoulos was the first to synthesize C_{60} the first molecular carbon modification applying initially a contact arc process (2) with specific experimental conditions for fast electrode degradation, hence, accelerated carbon evaporation. Moreover, he developed a method to sinter graphite rods from commercially available "amorphous" ^{13}C carbon dust. Applying a resistive heating process (3) and using such "isotopic" graphite rods, a few days before New Year's Eve 1989, he synthesized for the first time an unusual material which contained an exotic species: "isotopic" ^{13}C_{60}, From that he proved the existence of an all-carbon molecule with icosahedral "platonic" symmetry and truncated icosahedron "archimedean" shape, i.e. that of Kroto et al. 1985 predicted football molecule: C_{60} "Buckminsterfullerene"

The prehistory of the truncated icosahedron

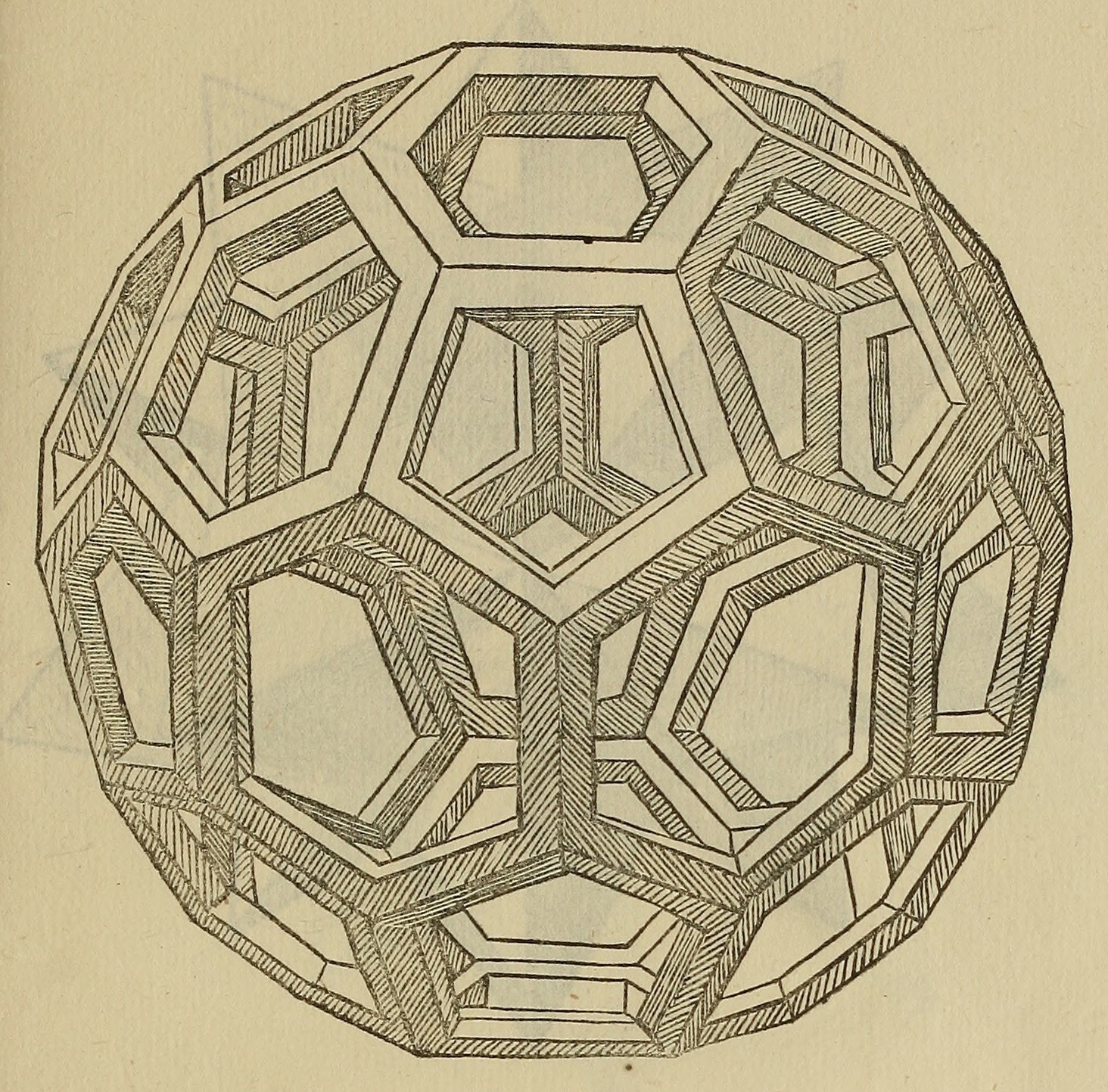
Ἐικοσάεδρον ἀποτετμημένον κενόν Leonardo da Vinci 1498

Pythagoras of Samos (Πυθαγόρας ὁ Σάμιος, 580-496 BC) knew all five regular solids: tetrahedron, cube, octahedron, dodecahedron, and icosahedron. Theaetetus of Athens (Θεαίτητος ὁ Ἀθηναῖος, 417-369 BC) was probably the first to prove that there are exactly five regular solids. His contemporary Platon (Πλάτων, 427-347 BC) assigned the solids to five elements: fire, earth, air, ether/cosmos, and water, respectively.

Archimedes of Syracus (Ἀρχιμήδης ὁ Συρακόσιος, 287-212 BC) mathematically described convex polyhedra based on the five regular solids. There are 13 Archimedean solids in total, including the truncated icosahedron. They consist of regular faces and satisfy the global uniformity of the vertices.

In his work De quinque corporibus regularibus written in the 1480s or early 1490s, Piero della Francesca quotes the aforementioned ancient Greek mathematicians and sketches the truncated icosahedron. A few years later Leonardo da Vinci illustrates the εἰκοσάεδρον ἀποτετμημένον κενόν (truncated hollow icosahedron) in perspective (see grafic on the right) in the book Divina Proportione of his mathematics teacher Luca Pacioli, which he completed in 1498.

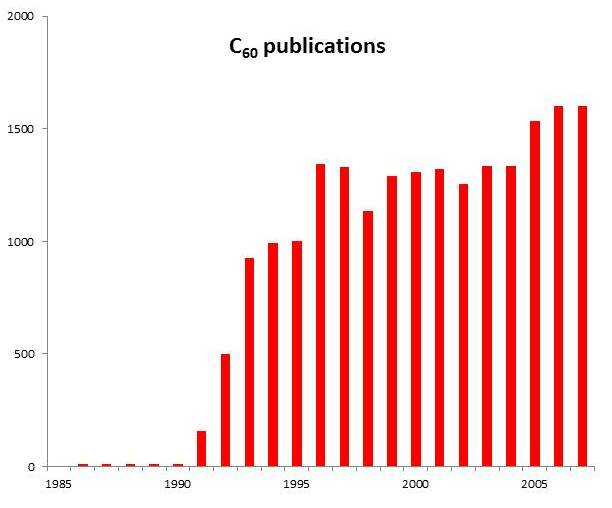
C_{60} publication activities triggered by the Heidelberg experiments 1990

In his effort to push the production yield further he then focused his research on the simple arc method (1) that culminated in 1990 in a yield of > 1 gram per day achieved by a robust and highly efficient arc process. As the fullerene material, however, was still embedded in the generated soot Fostiropoulos developed two possible extraction methods, either by applying thermal evaporation to expel the molecular species C_{60}, C_{70}... from the soot under vacuum conditions or by dispersing the soot in benzene where only fullerenes dissolve. The extracted powder of this "natural" pure fullerene mixture was analyzed by optical (UV to IR) as well as mass spectroscopy where also the "American football" shaped C_{70} was found. From the powder he could grow for the first time ultra-thin C_{60} films by vacuum thermal evaporation and watch the formation of hexagonal crystals from the "wine-red" benzene solution. From subsequent thin film chromatography studies the wine-red colour turned out to originate from the 10% C_{70} fraction in the natural fullerene mixture. The mass density of the novel Carbon crystals was determined experimentally as well as theoretically using data from a TEM crystal analysis measured for the first time in collaboration with Werner Kühlbrandt, EMBL Heidelberg, where the van der Waals diameter of the molecular "football" was determined: d_{C60}= 1.0 nm. In collaboration with Hans Hermann Eysel, Institute of Inorganic Chemistry, Heidelberg University, for the first time Raman spectra of C_{60} have been measured.

Beginning of 1991 Fostiropoulos had been invited to visit the research group of astrophysicist Alain Léger at the then Université Pierre-et-Marie-Curie, Paris-VI for two months where they performed matrix isolation spectroscopy on C^{−}_{60} and C^{+}_{60} ions in cold Ne matrices in order to measure their optical absorptions under quasi-space conditions. Particularly, the positive ion was a potential candidate for the carrier of Diffuse Interstellar Bands as discussed independently by Harry Kroto 1987. An immediate proposal in cooperation with Fostiropoulos submitted by Alain Léger and Louis Le Sergeant d'Hendecourt for one week observing time at the Canada–France–Hawaii Telescope in order to search for C^{+}_{60} fingerprints in the interstellar medium had been accepted. However, subsequently, the MPIK in Heidelberg rejected its, hence, Fostiropoulos' participation in the search for C^{+}_{60} in the interstellar medium.
After all, in 1994 the hunt for the spectral fingerprints of the interstellar football provided a first paper where Bernard Foing and Pascale Ehrenfreund identified the molecule as carrier of two diffuse interstellar bands. Their estimation has been confirmed in many other papers that roughly 0.1% (!) of all carbon in the interstellar medium exists as "C_{60} – a new form of carbon".

With his results on the synthesis, extraction and characterization of fullerenes published 1990 in NATURE (ResearchGate: 8,002 citations, as at May 2025) and some astrophysical aspects of ionized and hydrogenated C_{60} which he found in his data Fostiropoulos hastily completed his Ph.D. thesis by the end of 1991 that has been triggering waves of publications worldwide since then.

==== Addendum: "Patents" ====

Before their publication in NATURE a patent application based on the results of the Heidelberg experiments had been filed with a US Patent Office in Tucson, Arizona. Principal applicant had been the University of Arizona, whereas the claims of the MPIK Heidelberg had been limited to the statutory minimum. Ten days later a follow-up application in favour of a private investor has been filed there, too. After one year a European Patent has been filed under the title "New form of carbon". Fostiropoulos was neither informed in advance nor involved in these patent applications based solely on his doctoral thesis "C60 – eine neue Form des Kohlenstoffs".

=== Invited Talks (1991–1993) ===
	Institution	Host
15 Jan 1991	Université Pierre et Marie Curie, Paris	Alain Léger, Groupe de physique des solides
20–30 Oct 1991	Centre Majorana Erice, Sicilia	Summer School: "Origin of life"
January 1992	ETH Zurich	Hans-Ude Nissen, Institute for Solid State Physics
25 Mar 1992	National Nuclear Research Center Karlsruhe	Reinhard von Ammon, Institute of hot chemistry
9 May 1992	Institut Fresenius, Wiesbaden	
26 May 1992	Tübingen University	Andreas Hirsch
2 Jun 1992	Konstanz University	Paul Leiderer, Klaus Dransfeld, Surface and Low Temperature Physics
23–26 Jun 1992	Adriatico Research Conference, Trieste	"Clusters and Fullerenes"
April 1993	Göttingen University	Klaus Fricke, Göttingen Observatory
7–10 Oct 1993	Jena University	Thomas Henning, Max Planck Group: "Dust in star forming regions"

=== Anecdotes ===
Few months after Fostiropoulos began his research on the strange soot Krätschmer recommended to stop this vain undertaking and focus on astrophysically relevant carbon clusters like C_{2}, C_{3}, C_{4}... Therefore, Fostiropoulos decided to waste 18 months (= Ph.D. halftime) playing football and if there would be no positive result he would switch to "reasonable" carbon clusters. After 12 months intensive research, however, he succeeded to prove the existence of the all-carbon molecule with icosahedral symmetry (isotopic ^{13}C_{60}) and after 15 months (around 1 May 1990) he had optimized the synthesis yield and accomplished to extract the fullerene powder from the soot. After 18 months they submitted their NATURE publication.

In summer 1990 during a cooperation at the Heidelberg University on Raman spectroscopy to verify the hypothetical "football" structure of the molecule one of the partners expressed carefully his concerns: "hopefully it is not a cold fusion ;-)" referring to the most famous erratum at that time published by Martin Fleischmann et al. 1989.

The NATURE publication had been accepted 7 September 1990. On this occasion Fostiropoulos had the opportunity to meet and discuss with Rick Smalley the later Nobel Laureate (1996) on a conference when he invited him and Krätschmer "to come to Konstanz and use a fraction of Smalley's lecture time" (12 September 1990) where Krätschmer reported their break-through in preparation of large amounts of fullerenes. A few days later Harry Kroto, also Nobel Laureate (1996), and his wife Margaret unexpectedly visited the Heidelberg scientists on their way back from a conference in Yugoslavia. Kroto presented Fostiropoulos and Krätschmer with a bottle of "red wine" Châteauneuf-du-Pape 1985. On the last working day before Christmas 1990 Fostiropoulos and Krätschmer enjoyed Kroto's wine at the Max Planck Institute in Heidelberg.

On the occasion of Fostiropoulos' final Ph.D. thesis presentation to the Department of Cosmophysics of the institute he invited young Bernd Wagner to the talk as his guest in order to meet him in person and introduce him to the department as the lucky guy who kicked off the Heidelberg part of the C_{60} story.

After the abortion of his first scientific career by the end of 1993 Fostiropoulos worked in various jobs from 1994 till 1997 when he joined the Hellenic Army to perform his military service.

== Second scientific career – "applications" ==
For his come-back to fullerene research Fostiropoulos' references have been Nobel Laureate Harry Kroto and Robert Schlögl.

=== IT applications: distance education ===
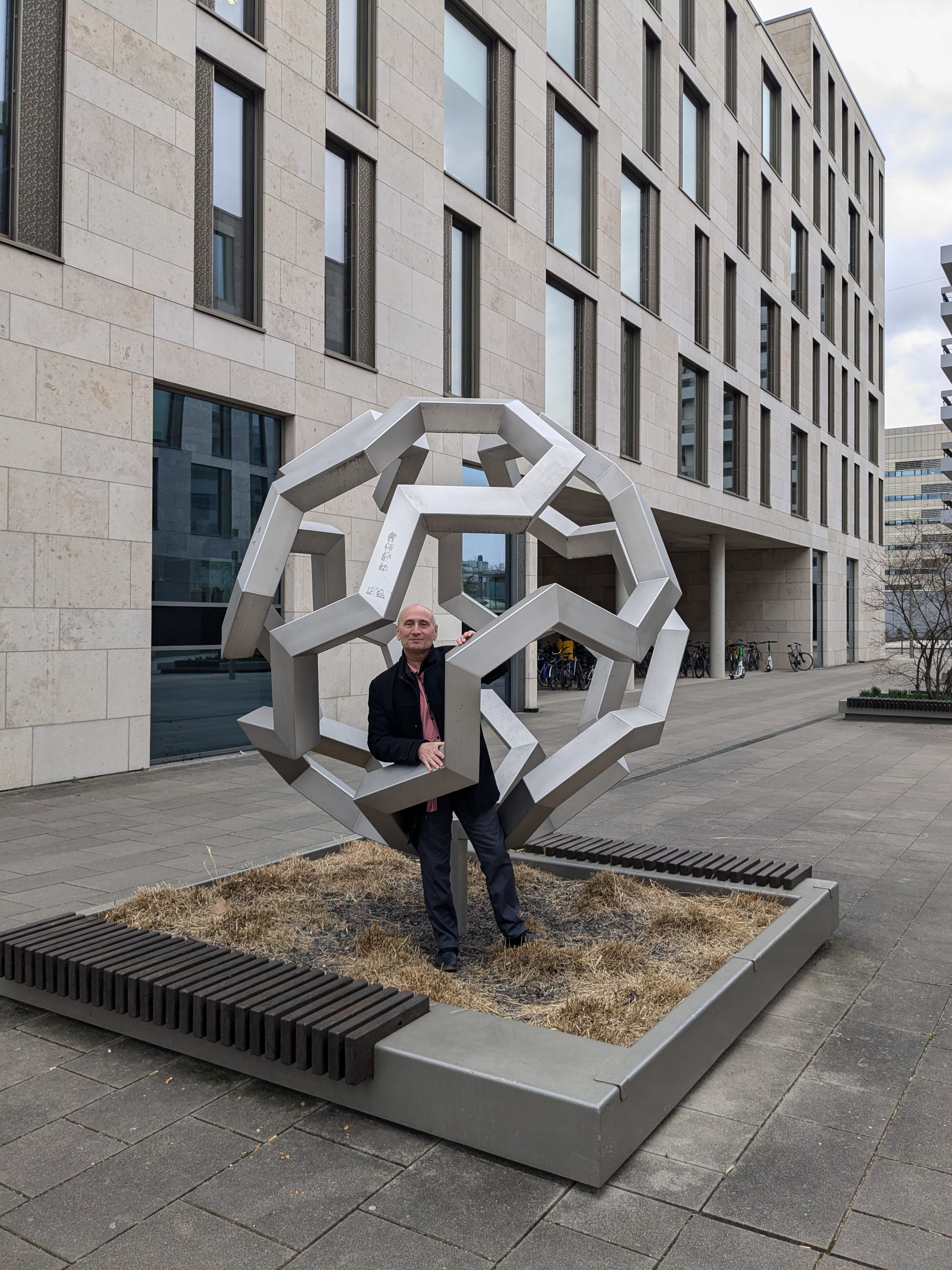
Endohedral fullerene: Fostiropoulos at the Mathematikon building of the Heidelberg University (2025) inside a sculpture depicting a Hamiltonian cycle on the molecular structure of C_{60} at a scale of 1:2 billion

In 1998, Fostiropoulos resumed scientific activities joining the Institute for Media Communication at the former German National Research Centre for Information Technology GMD-Forschungszentrum Informationstechnik for three years where he participated in IT projects in the field of distance education. He had been running a JAVA based platform for regular lectures from Schloss Birlinghoven (GMD headquarters) to the Geneva University. For the first time internet connectivity including satellite transmission (EUTELSAT) was used to set-up a transatlantic teaching network between the then CAPE consortium of the University of Pennsylvania, via GMD, to ICI at Bucharest University as well as the Bulgarian Academy of Sciences in Sofia demonstrating transatlantic tele-teaching capability with video-conference and lecture notes through low bandwidth internet applications.

=== Fullerene applications: organic solar cells ===
The research field of organic solar cells (OSC) is divided in two parts. Most scientists use wet chemical methods applying polymer materials as one of the two components to form the absorber layer of the devices, whereas the use of small absorber molecules deposited by vacuum thermal evaporation techniques is rather a niche of the field. However, in both concepts C_{60} is the other important component of the absorber because of its extraordinary electron acceptor properties. In 2002 Fostiropoulos presented a bi-layer heterojunction absorber concept with Zn phthalocyanine and C_{60} molecules as donor and acceptor materials, respectively. Thus, he achieved a power conversion efficiency of η=2.5% which was the world record for small molecules OSC at that time catching up a similar record of polymer solar cells (2001–2003 by Brabec, Sariciftci, Hummelen 2001). In 2003 these two records brought the field into focus of solar energy research which had been the beginning of a generous funding period in Germany for the field of organic photovoltaics that lasted more than a decade.

In December 2003 Fostiropoulos founded the Organic Solar Cells Group at the Institute Heterogeneous Material Systems within the Helmholtz-Zentrum Berlin (the then Hahn-Meitner-Institut). He was awarded more than two million € mainly from the Federal Ministries BMU and BMBF, to a minor degree also by the Solar Energy Division at HMI to build and equip laboratories for the development of vacuum preparation techniques for ultra-thin organic layer systems. Since then, the two ministries have been directly financing the Organic Solar Cells Group activities by ≈ 4 M€ additional project funding. From 2014 on Fostiropoulos has been focussing on hybrid Perovskite solar cells whereupon his group developed an industrially relevant all-vacuum fabrication method for such devices.

=== Teaching and consultancy ===
Fostiropoulos had been teaching at Heidelberg University, Free University Berlin, Potsdam University as well as Aristotle University of Thessaloniki (AUTh) in the fields of physical chemistry, soft matter physics and organic photovoltaics. During a four years period from 2011 to 2014 he had been visiting AUTh three months per year where he had been giving lectures in the Ph.D. program of the Department of Physics and collaborated with Stergios Logothetidis and the LTFN - "Laboratory for Thin Films Nanosystems and Nanometrology" in the field of organic electronic materials and devices. Thus, he had the opportunity to experience the financial crisis of his country up close.

In the frame of EU project ROleMak Fostiropoulos had been consultant to the Department of Physics at AUTh.

=== Invited talks (since 2002) ===
	Institution/conference	Host
19 Nov 2002	Bayreuth University	Hans-Werner Schmidt
2003	BASF, Ludwigshafen	Karl-Heinrich Hahn
23 Jun 2005	FVS Annual Meeting, Berlin	
20 Feb 2006	Light Technology Institut, KIT, Karlsruhe	Uli Lemmer
29 Sep 2006	Fritz Haber Institute, Berlin	Robert Schlögl
16–18 Jun 2008	IC4N 2008, Halkidiki	Efstathios Meletis
9–11 Jul 2008	ISFOE, Halkidiki	Stergios Logothetidis
28 Jun – 3 Jul 2009	IC4N 2009, Rodes	Efstathios Meletis
8–10 Jul 2009	ISFOE09, Halkidiki	Stergios Logothetidis
13–15 Jul 2009	NN09, Thessaloniki	Stergios Logothetidis
2010	NCSR DEMOKRITOS, Athens	Nick Kanellopoulos
26–29 Jun 2011	IC4N 2011, Crete	Efstathios Meletis
30 Jun – 7 Jul 2012	NANOTEXNOLOGY 2012, Thessaloniki	Stergios Logothetidis
16–20 Jun 2013	IC4N 2013, Corfu	Efstathios Meletis
6–13 Jul 2013	NANOTEXNOLOGY 2013, Thessaloniki	Stergios Logothetidis
5–12 Jul 2014	NANOTEXNOLOGY 2014, Thessaloniki	Stergios Logothetidis
4–11 Jul 2015	NANOTEXNOLOGY 2015, Thessaloniki	Stergios Logothetidis
2–9 Jul 2016	NANOTEXNOLOGY 2016, Thessaloniki	Stergios Logothetidis

== Grants and awarded projects ==
During his early career (1989–1993) Fostiropoulos was granted three times fellowships from the Max Planck Society for his fundamental research on the synthesis of fullerenes and their characterization.

After his scientific come-back to physics in 2001 he had been awarded and coordinated several German national (BMU, BMBF) as well as a Greek-German bilateral (GSRT, BMBF) and EU funded projects ("GR-ELECT", "OrgaPVnet", "SOHyb", "OVPD") with total fund raising of more than eight Million €. Moreover, he also participated in other international projects as a partner.

(For more information click "show" in collapsed table below)

run-time	projects/affiliations	position
2013–2016	EU: "SMARTONICS"	participant
2012–2015	Helmholtz Energy Alliance	participant
2011–2014	EU: "ROleMak"	participant
2001–2003	BMU: "Polymer Solar Cells"	participant
2001–2003	BMU: "Organic Solar Cells"	participant
2014–2015	(bilateral Greek/German) GSRT/BMBF: "GR-ELECT"	German coordinator
2009–2012	BMBF: "SOHyb"	coordinator
2006–2009	EU Coordination Action: "OrgaPVnet"	coordinator of German affiliates
2003–2007	BMU: "Organic Solar Cells with OVPD"	coordinator
1993–1993	Max Planck Group: Dust in star forming regions, Jena University	Max Planck Fellow
1992–1992	Max Planck Institute for Nuclear Physics, Heidelberg	Max Planck Fellow
1989–1992	Max Planck Institute for Nuclear Physics, Heidelberg	Max Planck Ph.D. Stipend

== International events ==
In the frame of the EU Coordination Action "OrgaPVNet" he represented 20 German affiliates together with Andreas Hinsch, Fraunhofer Institute for Solar Energy Systems ISE. They co-organized the "OrgaPVNet: National Workshop of German Affiliates", 22–23 January 2007, at the former Hahn-Meitner-Institut Berlin.
In 2012 Fostiropoulos and Chunyang Jia, University of Electronic Science and Technology of China, co-organized "The Sino-German Symposium on Organic Photovoltaic Materials and Organic Solar Cells” in Chengdu, Sichuan, China.
Since 2012 Fostiropoulos is member of the International Scientific Committee of the annual event NANOTEXNOLOGY organized by the Aristotle University of Thessaloniki (coord. Stergios Logothetidis). It takes place every July in the city of Thessaloniki, Greece. In the wake of the corona crisis 2020, Fostiropoulos set up a virtual platform that expanded the annual NANOTEXNOLOGY with its virtual mirror image that displayed every component (workshops, joint events, poster sessions, exhibition) of the live multi-event in Thessaloniki. For the virtual part, more than 200 video-conference rooms were available for small and large groups of participants.

== Memberships and honorary offices ==
Fostiropoulos is a member of the

- Hellenic Institute for Advanced Studies HIAS
- Greek Scientists Society GSS
- non-profit scientific association Optotransmitter-Umweltschutz-Technologie e.V. OUT e.V.

In January 2023 Fostiropoulos has been elected to the board of directors of OUT e.V.

== Editorial ==
G. Eckel & K. Fostiropoulos (Editors), "Institute for Media Communication, Accomplishments in depth – Periode 1993–1999" (GMD 1999)

== Musical Activities ==
Towards the end of his academic career, Fostiropoulos increasingly devoted himself to classical guitar playing and, as he had done four decades earlier, joined an ensemble. Since 2025, he has been a member of the Berlin guitar orchestra Fête de la guitare, conducted by Tzvetan Stoyanov.
