= Fullerene chemistry =

Chemistry of carbon's allotrope fullerene

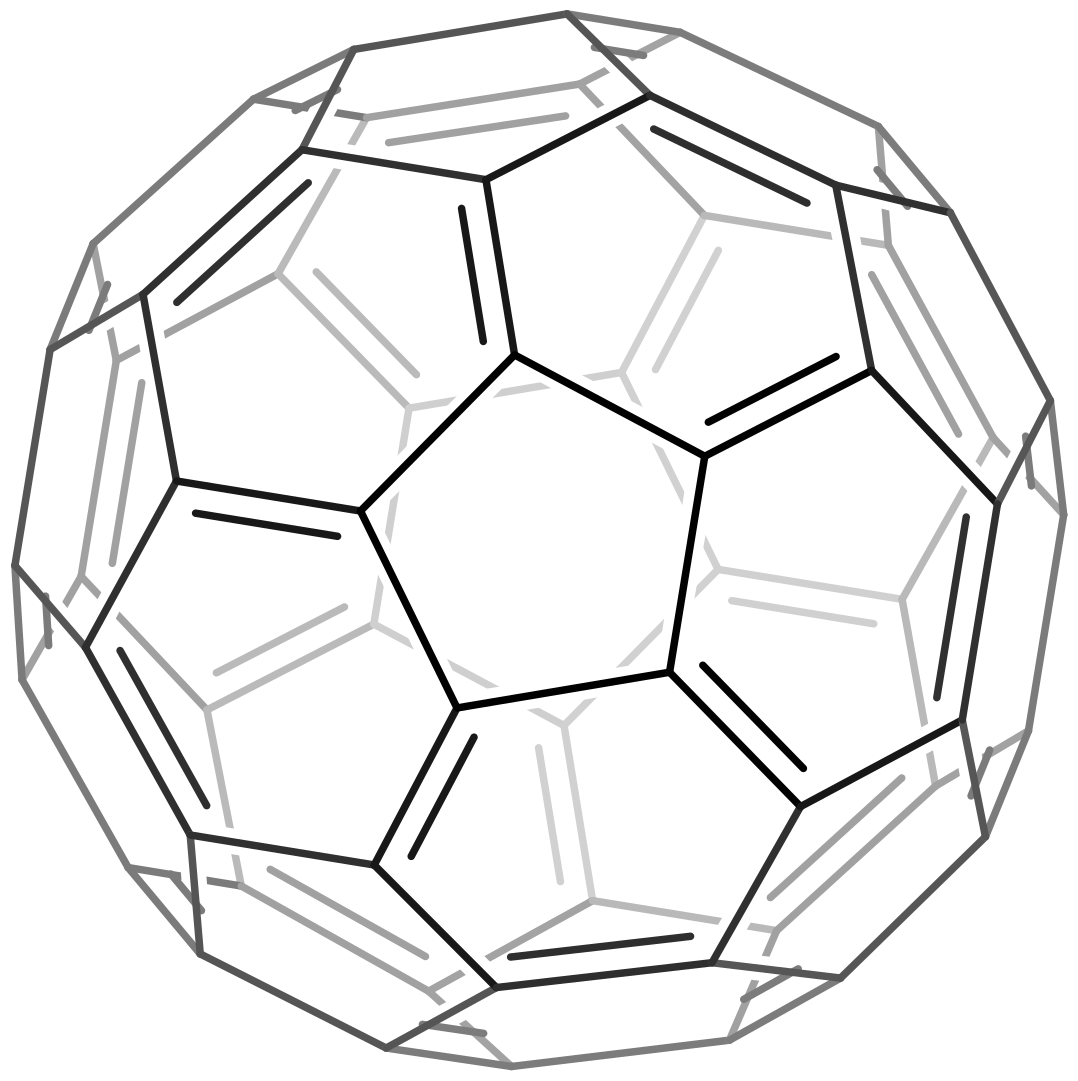
Fullerene C_{60}

Fullerene chemistry is a field of organic chemistry devoted to the chemical properties of fullerenes. Research in this field is driven by the need to functionalize fullerenes and tune their properties. For example, fullerene is notoriously insoluble and adding a suitable group can enhance solubility. By adding a polymerizable group, a fullerene polymer can be obtained. Functionalized fullerenes are divided into two classes: exohedral fullerenes with substituents outside the cage and endohedral fullerenes with trapped molecules inside the cage.

This article covers the chemistry of these so-called "buckyballs," while the chemistry of carbon nanotubes is covered in carbon nanotube chemistry.

== Chemical properties of fullerenes ==
Fullerene or C_{60} is soccer-ball-shaped or I_{h} with 12 pentagons and 20 hexagons. According to Euler's theorem these 12 pentagons are required for closure of the carbon network consisting of n hexagons and C_{60} is the first stable fullerene because it is the smallest possible to obey this rule. In this structure none of the pentagons make contact with each other. Both C_{60} and its relative C_{70} obey this so-called isolated pentagon rule (IPR). The next homologue C_{84} has 24 IPR isomers of which several are isolated and another 51,568 non-IPR isomers. Non-IPR fullerenes have thus far only been isolated as endohedral fullerenes such as Tb_{3}N@C_{84} with two fused pentagons at the apex of an egg-shaped cage. or as fullerenes with exohedral stabilization such as C_{50}Cl_{10} and reportedly C_{60}H_{8}. Fullerenes with fewer than 60 carbons do not obey isolated pentagon rule (IPR).

Because of the molecule's spherical shape the carbon atoms are highly pyramidalized, which has far-reaching consequences for reactivity. It is estimated that strain energy constitutes 80% of the heat of formation. The conjugated carbon atoms respond to deviation from planarity by orbital rehybridization of the sp² orbitals and π orbitals to a sp^{2.27} orbital with a gain in p-character. The p lobes extend further outside the surface than they do into the interior of the sphere and this is one of the reasons a fullerene is electronegative. The other reason is that the empty low-lying π^{*} orbitals also have a high s character.

The double bonds in fullerene are not all the same. Two groups can be identified: 30 so-called [6,6] double bonds connect two hexagons and 60 [5,6] bonds connect a hexagon and a pentagon. Of the two the [6,6] bonds are shorter with more double-bond character and therefore a hexagon is often represented as a cyclohexatriene and a pentagon as a pentalene or [5]radialene. In other words, although the carbon atoms in fullerene are all conjugated the superstructure is not a super aromatic compound. The X-ray diffraction bond length values are 139.1 pm for the [6,6] bond and 145.5 pm for the [5,6] bond.

C_{60} fullerene has 60 π electrons but a closed shell configuration requires 72 electrons. The fullerene is able to acquire the missing electrons by reaction with potassium to form first the K_{6}C^{6−}_{60} salt and then the K_{12}C^{12−}_{60}. In this compound the bond length alternation observed in the parent molecule has vanished.

== Fullerene reactions ==
Fullerenes tend to react as electrophiles. An additional driving force is relief of strain when double bonds become saturated. Key in this type of reaction is the level of functionalization i.e. monoaddition or multiple additions and in case of multiple additions their topological relationships (new substituents huddled together or evenly spaced). In conformity with IUPAC rules, the terms methanofullerene are used to indicate the ring-closed (cyclopropane) fullerene derivatives, and fulleroid to ring-open (methanoannulene) structures.

=== Nucleophilic additions ===
Fullerenes react as electrophiles with a host of nucleophiles in nucleophilic additions. The intermediary formed carbanion is captured by another electrophile. Examples of nucleophiles are Grignard reagents and organolithium reagents. For example, the reaction of C_{60} with methylmagnesium chloride stops quantitatively at the penta-adduct with the methyl groups centered around a cyclopentadienyl anion which is subsequently protonated. Another nucleophilic reaction is the Bingel reaction. Fullerene reacts with chlorobenzene and aluminium chloride in a Friedel-Crafts alkylation type reaction. In this hydroarylation the reaction product is the 1,2-addition adduct (Ar-CC-H).

=== Pericyclic reactions ===
The [6,6] bonds of fullerenes react as dienes or dienophiles in cycloadditions for instance Diels-Alder reactions. 4-membered rings can be obtained by [2+2]cycloadditions for instance with benzyne. An example of a 1,3-dipolar cycloaddition to a 5-membered ring is the Prato reaction.

=== Hydrogenations ===
Fullerenes are easily hydrogenated by several methods. The smallest perhydrogenated fullerene known is dodecahedrane C_{20}H_{20}, formally derived from the smallest possible but unknown fullerene, C_{20}, which comprises just 12 pentagonal faces.

Examples of hydrofullerenes are C_{60}H_{18} and C_{60}H_{36}. However, completely hydrogenated C_{60}H_{60} is only hypothetical because of large strain. Highly hydrogenated fullerenes are not stable, as prolonged hydrogenation of fullerenes by direct reaction with hydrogen gas at high temperature conditions results in cage fragmentation. At the final reaction stage this causes collapse of cage structure with formation of polycyclic aromatic hydrocarbons.

C_{60} reacts with Li[BHEt_{3}] to the weak base [HC_{60}]^{−}, which is isolated as Li[HC_{60}][H_{2}O]_{6-9}.

=== Halogenation ===
Fullerenes can react with halogens. The preferred pattern for addition C_{60} is calculated to be 1,9- for small groups and 1,7- for bulky groups. C_{60}F_{60} is a possible structure. C_{60} reacts with Cl_{2} gas at 250 °C to a material with average composition C_{60}Cl_{24}, although only C_{60} can be detected by mass spectrometry. With liquid Br_{2} C_{60} yields C_{60}Br_{24}, in which all 24 bromine atoms are equivalent. The only characterized iodine-containing compounds are intermediates: [C_{60}][CH_{2}I_{2}][C_{6}H_{6}] and [C_{60}][I_{2}]_{2}.

=== Hydroxylations ===
Fullerenes can be hydroxylated to fullerenols or fullerols. Water solubility depends on the total number of hydroxyl groups that can be attached. One method is fullerene reaction in diluted sulfuric acid and potassium nitrate to C_{60}(OH)_{15}. Another method is reaction in diluted sodium hydroxide catalysed by TBAH adding 24 to 26 hydroxyl groups. Hydroxylation has also been reported using solvent-free NaOH / hydrogen peroxide. C_{60}(OH)_{8} was prepared using a multistep procedure starting from a mixed peroxide fullerene. The maximum number of hydroxyl groups that can be attached (hydrogen peroxide method) stands at 36–40.

=== Electrophilic additions ===
Fullerenes react in electrophilic additions as well. The reaction with bromine can add up to 24 bromine atoms to the sphere. The record holder for fluorine addition is C_{60}F_{48}. According to in silico predictions the as yet elusive C_{60}F_{60} may have some of the fluorine atoms in endo positions (pointing inwards) and may resemble a tube more than it does a sphere.

=== Eliminations ===
Protocols have been investigated for removing substituents via eliminations after they have served their purpose. Examples are the retro-Bingel reaction and the retro-Prato reaction.

=== Carbene additions ===
Fullerenes react with carbenes to methanofullerenes. The reaction of fullerene with dichlorocarbene (created by sodium trichloroacetate pyrolysis) was first reported in 1993. A single addition takes place along a [6,6] bond.

=== Radical additions ===
Fullerenes can be considered radical scavengers. With a simple hydrocarbon radical such as the t-butyl radical obtained by thermolysis or photolysis from a suitable precursor the tBuC60 radical is formed that can be studied. The unpaired electron does not delocalize over the entire sphere but takes up positions in the vicinity of the tBu substituent.

== Fullerenes as ligands ==
Fullerene is a ligand in organometallic chemistry. The organometallic chemistry of C_{60} is dictated by its spherical geometry and localized polyalkene π-electronic structure. All reported derivatives are η^{2} complexe in which the metal coordinates at a six–six ring fusion with formal double bond. No analogous η^{4}-diene or η^{6}-triene complexes are prepared.

C_{60} and C_{70} form complexes with a variety of molecules. In the solid state lattice structures are stabilized by the intermolecular interactions. Charge transfer complexes are formed with weak electron donors. The [6,6] double bond is electron-deficient and usually forms metallic bonds with η = 2 hapticity. Bonding modes such as η = 5 or η = 6 can be induced by modification of the coordination sphere.

- [C_{60}][ferrocene]_{2}, in which the C_{60} molecules are arranged in close-packed layers
- [C_{60}][1,4-dihydroquinone]_{3} has C_{60} molecules trapped in a hydrogen-bonded of 1,4-dihydroquinone molecules
- The solvated C_{60} compounds: [C_{60}][C_{6}H_{6}]_{4} and [C_{60}][CH_{2}I_{2}][C_{6}H_{6}], and the intercalate [C_{60}][I_{2}]_{2}, are structurally characterized.
- [C_{70}][S_{8}]_{6}
- [C_{60}][γ-cyclodextrin]_{2}
- C_{60} fullerene reacts with tungsten hexacarbonyl W(CO)_{6} to the (η²-C_{60})W(CO)_{5} complex in a hexane solution in direct sunlight.

== Variants ==
=== Open-cage fullerenes ===
A part of fullerene research is devoted to so-called open-cage fullerenes whereby one or more bonds are removed chemically exposing an orifice. In this way it is possible to insert into it small molecules such as hydrogen, helium or lithium. The first such open-cage fullerene was reported in 1995. In endohedral hydrogen fullerenes the opening, hydrogen insertion and closing back up has already been demonstrated.

=== Heterofullerenes ===
In heterofullerenes at least one carbon atom is replaced by another element. Based on spectroscopy, substitutions have been reported with boron (borafullerenes), nitrogen (azafullerenes), oxygen, arsenic, germanium, phosphorus, silicon, iron, copper, nickel, rhodium and iridium. Reports on isolated heterofullerenes are limited to those based on nitrogen and oxygen.

The fullerene oxides C_{60}O and C_{70}O are observed in minor in fullerene-containing soot. Only C_{60}O is isolated as a pure compound in macroscopic amounts.

=== Fullerene dimers ===
The C_{60} fullerene dimerizes in a formal [2+2] cycloaddition to a C_{120} bucky dumbbell in the solid state by mechanochemistry (high-speed vibration milling) with potassium cyanide as a catalyst. The trimer has also been reported using 4-aminopyridine as catalyst (4% yield) and observed with scanning tunneling microscopy as a monolayer.

== Synthesis ==
=== Multistep fullerene synthesis ===
Although the procedure for the synthesis of the C_{60} fullerene is well established (generation of a large current between two nearby graphite electrodes in an inert atmosphere) a 2002 study described an organic synthesis of the compound starting from simple organic compounds.

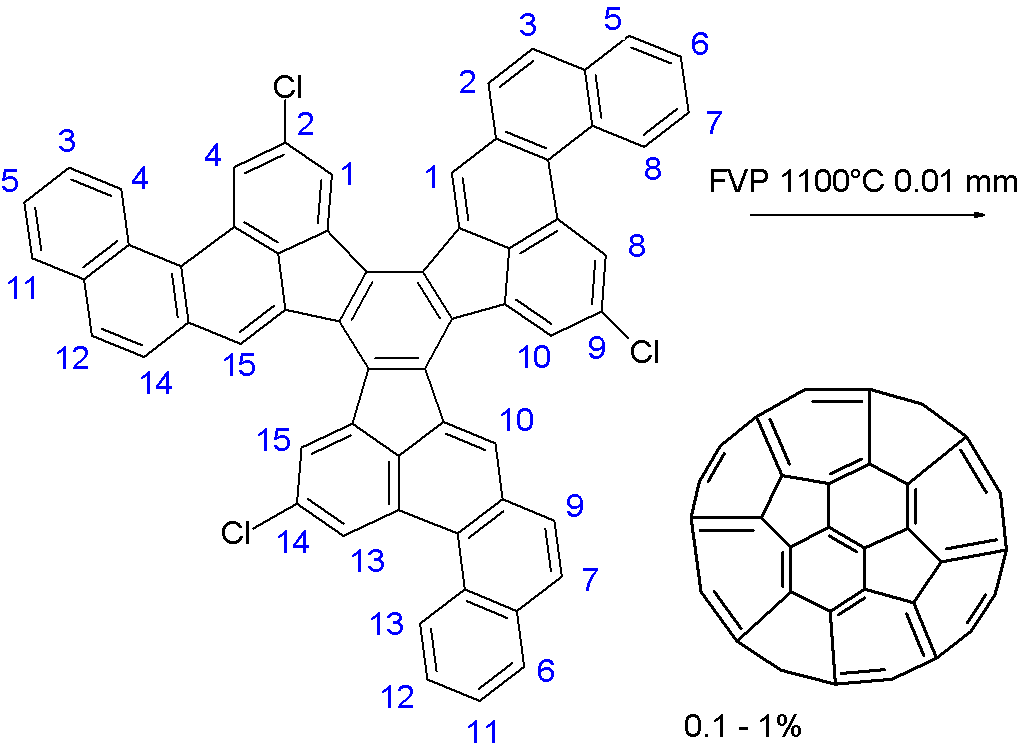

In the final step a large polycyclic aromatic hydrocarbon consisting of 13 hexagons and three pentagons was submitted to flash vacuum pyrolysis at 1100 °C and 0.01 Torr. The three carbon chlorine bonds served as free radical incubators and the ball was stitched up in a no-doubt complex series of radical reactions. The chemical yield was low: 0.1 to 1%. A small percentage of fullerenes is formed in any process which involves burning of hydrocarbons, e.g. in candle burning. The yield through a combustion method is often above 1%. The method proposed above does not provide any advantage for synthesis of fullerenes compared to the usual combustion method, and therefore, the organic synthesis of fullerenes remains a challenge for chemistry.

Continuous high-resolution transmission electron microscopic video imaging of the electron-beam-induced bottom-up synthesis of fullerene C_{60} through cyclodehydrogenation of C_{60}H_{30} was reported in 2021.

A similar exercise aimed at construction of a C78 cage in 2008 (but leaving out the precursor's halogens) did not result in a sufficient yield but at least the introduction of Stone Wales defects could be ruled out. C60 synthesis through a fluorinated fullerene precursor was reported in 2013

== Purification ==
Fullerene purification is the process of obtaining a fullerene compound free of contamination. In fullerene production mixtures of C_{60}, C_{70} and higher homologues are always formed. Fullerene purification is key to fullerene science and determines fullerene prices and the success of practical applications of fullerenes. The first available purification method for C_{60} fullerene was by HPLC from which small amounts could be generated at large expense.

A practical laboratory-scale method for purification of soot enriched in C_{60} and C_{70} starts with extraction in toluene followed by filtration with a paper filter. The solvent is evaporated and the residue (the toluene-soluble soot fraction) redissolved in toluene and subjected to column chromatography. C_{60} elutes first with a purple color and C_{70} is next displaying a reddish-brown color.

In nanotube processing the established purification method for removing amorphous carbon and metals is by competitive oxidation (often a sulfuric acid / nitric acid mixture). It is assumed that this oxidation creates oxygen containing groups (hydroxyl, carbonyl, carboxyl) on the nanotube surface which electrostatically stabilize them in water and which can later be utilized in chemical functionalization. One report reveals that the oxygen containing groups in actuality combine with carbon contaminations absorbed to the nanotube wall that can be removed by a simple base wash. Cleaned nanotubes are reported to have reduced D/G ratio indicative of less functionalization, and the absence of oxygen is also apparent from IR spectroscopy and X-ray photoelectron spectroscopy.

=== Experimental purification strategies ===
A recent kilogram-scale fullerene purification strategy was demonstrated by Nagata et al. In this method C_{60} was separated from a mixture of C_{60}, C_{70} and higher fullerene compounds by first adding the amidine compound DBU to a solution of the mixture in 1,2,3-trimethylbenzene. DBU as it turns out only reacts to C_{70} fullerenes and higher which reaction products separate out and can be removed by filtration. C_{60} fullerenes do not have any affinity for DBU and are subsequently isolated. Other diamine compounds like DABCO do not share this selectivity.

C_{60} but not C_{70} forms a 1:2 inclusion compound with cyclodextrin (CD). A separation method for both fullerenes based on this principle is made possible by anchoring cyclodextrin to colloidal gold particles through a sulfur-sulfur bridge. The Au/CD compound is very stable and soluble in water and selectively extracts C_{60} from the insoluble mixture after refluxing for several days. The C_{70} fullerene component is then removed by simple filtration. C_{60} is driven out from the Au/CD compound by adding adamantol which has a higher affinity for the cyclodextrin cavity. Au/CD is completely recycled when adamantol in turn is driven out by adding ethanol and ethanol removed by evaporation; 50 mg of Au/CD captures 5 mg of C_{60} fullerene.

== See also ==
- Solubility of fullerenes
- Geodesic polyarene
