= Prato reaction =

Example of the well-known 1,3-dipolar cycloaddition of azomethine ylides to olefins

The Prato reaction is a particular example of the well-known 1,3-dipolar cycloaddition of azomethine ylides to olefins. In fullerene chemistry this reaction refers to the functionalization of fullerenes and nanotubes. The amino acid sarcosine reacts with paraformaldehyde when heated at reflux in toluene to an ylide which reacts with a double bond in a 6,6 ring position in a fullerene via a 1,3-dipolar cycloaddition to yield a N-methylpyrrolidine derivative or pyrrolidinofullerene or pyrrolidino[[3,4:1,2]] [60]fullerene in 82% yield based on C_{60} conversion.

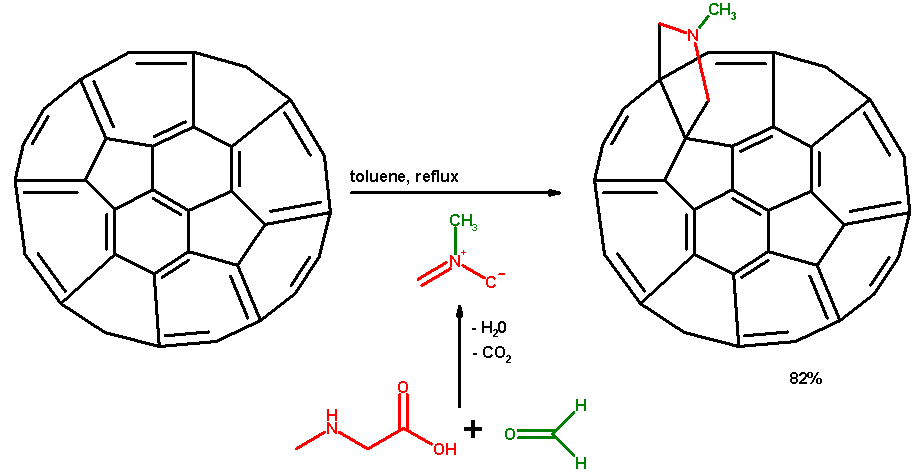
Prato reaction of azomethine ylide with fullerene

== Applications ==
In one application a liquid fullerene is obtained when the pyrrolidone substituent is a 2,4,6-tris(alkyloxy)phenyl group although a small amount of solvent is still possibly present.

== Origins ==
This reaction was derived from the work of Otohiko Tsuge on Azomethine Ylide Chemistry developed in the late 1980s. Tsuge's work was applied to fullerenes by Maurizio Prato, thus gaining the name.

== Metallofullerenes and Carbon Nanotubes ==
It is known that the Prato reaction is very useful to functionalize endohedral metallofullerenes. Prato reaction on M3N@C80 gives initially [5,6]-adduct (kinetic product), which convert upon heating to the [6,6]-adduct (thermodynamic product). The rate of isomerization is highly dependent on the metal size inside the carbon cage.

This method is also used in the functionalization of single wall nanotubes. When the amino acid is modified with a glycine chain the resulting nanotubes are soluble in common solvents such chloroform and acetone. Another characteristic of the treated nanotubes is their larger aggregate dimensions compared to untreated nanotubes.

In an alternative method a nanotube addition is performed with the N-oxide of trimethylamine and LDA at reflux in tetrahydrofuran with an efficiency of 1 functional group in 16 nanotube carbon atoms. When the amine also carries an aromatic group such as pyrene the reaction takes place even at room temperature because this group preorganizes itself to the nanotube surface prior to reaction by pi stacking.

== Retro-Prato reaction ==
Just as in other fullerene reactions like the Bingel reaction or Diels-Alder reactions this reaction can be reversed. A thermal cycloelimination of a pyrrolidinofullerene with a strong dipolarophile such as maleic acid and a catalyst such as Wilkinson's catalyst or copper triflate in 1,2-dichlorobenzene at reflux 8 to 18 hours regenerates the pristine C_{60} fullerene. The dipolarophile is required in a 30 fold excess and traps the ylide driving the reaction to completion. The N-methylpyrrolidine derivative reacts poorly (5% yield) and for a successful reaction the nitrogen ring also requires substitution in the α-position with methyl, phenyl or carboxylic ester groups.

Other methods have been investigated: by applying heat or via a combination of ionic liquid and microwave chemistry.
