= Logothetidis =

Logothetidis or Logothetides (Greek: Λογοθετίδης) is a Greek surname. The feminine form is Logothetidou (Λογοθετίδου). Notable people with the surname include:

- Leon Sculy Logothetides (1853–1912), Romanian surgeon and politician
- Stergios Logothetidis (born 1953), Greek physicist
- Vasilis Logothetidis (1897–1960), Greek comedian
