= Transition metal fullerene complex =

Chemical compounds containing spheroidical carbon compounds

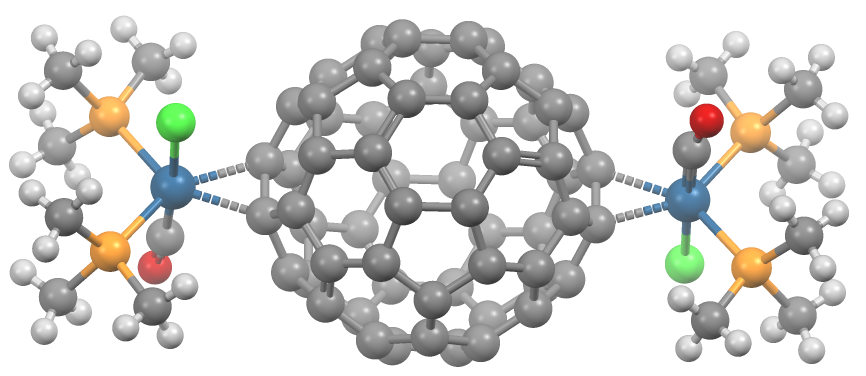
Structure of C_{60}[IrCl(CO)(PMe_{3})_{2}]_{2}. Color code: green = Cl, blue = Ir, ochre = P

A transition metal fullerene complex is a coordination complex wherein fullerene serves as a ligand. Fullerenes are typically spheroidal carbon compounds, the most prevalent being buckminsterfullerene, C_{60}.

One year after it was prepared in milligram quantities in 1990, C_{60} was shown to function as a ligand in the complex [Ph_{3}P]_{2}Pt(η^{2}-C_{60}).

Since this report, a variety of transition metals and binding modes were demonstrated. Most transition metal fullerene complex are derived from C_{60}, although other fullerenes also coordinate to metals as seen with C_{70}Rh(H)(CO)(PPh_{3})_{2}.

== Binding modes ==
As ligands, fullerenes behave similarly to electron-deficient alkenes such as tetracyanoethylene. Thus, their complexes are a subset of metal-alkene complexes. They almost always coordinate in a dihapto fashion and prefer electron-rich metal centers. This binding occurs on the junction of two 6-membered rings. Hexahapto and pentahapto bonding is rarely observed.

In Ru_{3}(CO)_{9}(C_{60}), the fullerene binds to the triangular face of the cluster.

Illustrative Fullerene Complexes

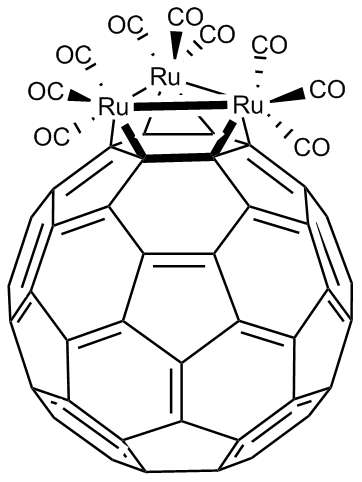
Ru_{3}(CO)_{9}(C_{60})

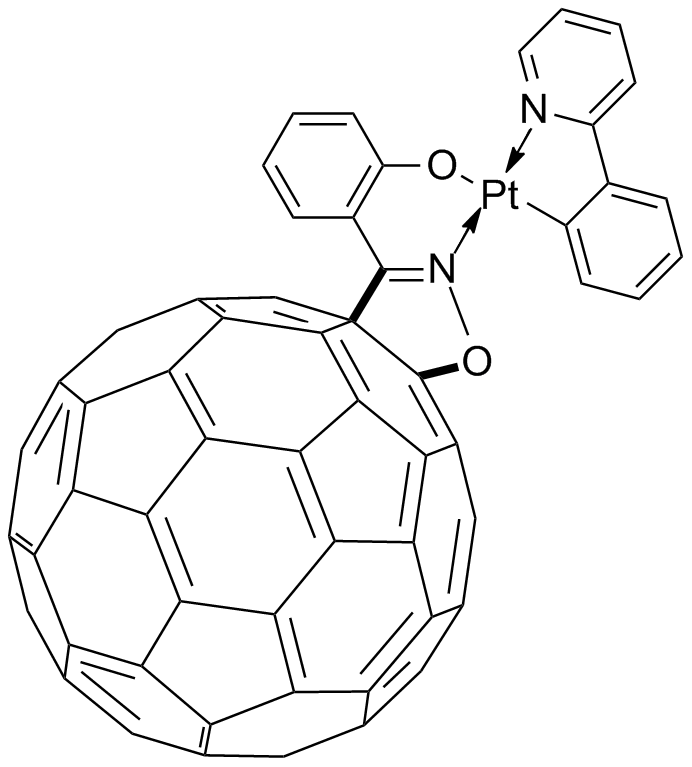
Platinum complex of isoxazoline-modified fullerene.

== Examples ==
C_{60} forms stable complexes of the type M(C_{60})(diphosphine)(CO)_{3} for M = Mo, W. A dirhenium complexes is known with the formula Re_{2}(PMe_{3})_{4}H_{8}(η^{2}:η^{2}C_{60}) where two of the hydrogen act as bridging ligands.

Many fullerene complexes are derived from platinum metals. An unusual cationic complex features three 16e Ru centers:

3 Cp*Ru(MeCN)_{3}^{+} + C_{60} → {[(Cp*Ru(MeCN)_{2}]_{3}C_{60}}^{3+} + 3 MeCN

Vaska's complex forms a 1:1 adduct, and the analogous IrCl(CO)(PEt_{3})_{2} binds 200x more strongly. Complexes with more than one fullerene ligand are illustrated by Ir_{4}(CO)_{3}(μ_{4}-CH)(PMe_{3})_{2}(μ-PMe)_{2}(CNCH_{2}Ph)(μ-η^{2}:η^{2}C_{60})(μ_{4}-η^{1}:η^{1}:η^{2}:η^{2}C_{60}). In this Ir_{4} cluster two fullerene ligands with multiple types of mixed binding. Platinum, palladium, and nickel form complexes of the type C_{60}ML_{2} where L is a monodentate or bidentate phosphorus ligand. They are prepared by displacement of weakly coordinating ligands such as ethylene:

[Ph_{3}P]_{2}Pt(C_{2}H_{4}) + C_{60} → [Ph_{3}P]_{2}Pt(η^{2}-C_{60}) + C_{2}H_{4}

In [(Et_{3}P)_{2}Pt]_{6}(η^{2}-C_{60}), six Pt centers are bound to the fullerene.

== Modified fullerenes as ligands ==
Osmium tetraoxide adds to C_{60} to give, in the presence of pyridine (py), the diolate C_{60}O_{2}OsO_{2}(py)_{2}.

The pentaphenyl anion C_{60}Ph_{5}^{−} behaves as a cyclopentadienyl ligand.

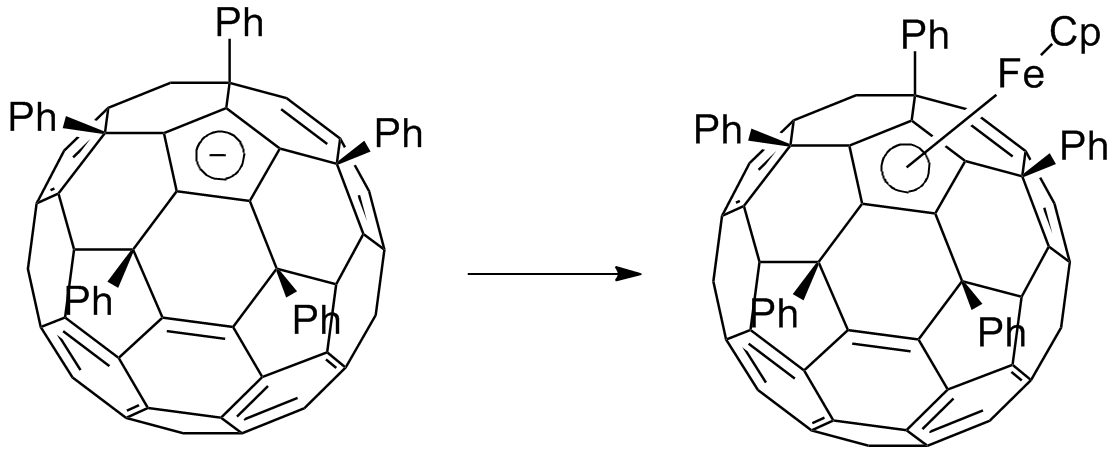
Ferrocene-like complex of C_{60}Ph_{5}^{−}.

In this example, the binding of the ligand is similar to ferrocene. The anion C_{60}(PhCH_{2})_{2}Ph functions as an indenyl-like ligand.

Fullerenes can also be substituents on otherwise conventional ligands as seen with an isoxazoline fullerene chelating to platinum, rhenium, and iridium compounds.

== Ongoing research ==
Although no application has been commercialized. non-linear optical (NLO) materials, and as supramolecular building blocks.

== See also ==
- Exohedral fullerene
- Endohedral fullerene

== Bibliography ==
- Spessard, Gary; Miessler, Gary (2010). Organometallic Chemistry ISBN 0195330994
