= Maurizio Prato (scientist) =

Italian organic chemist (born 1953)

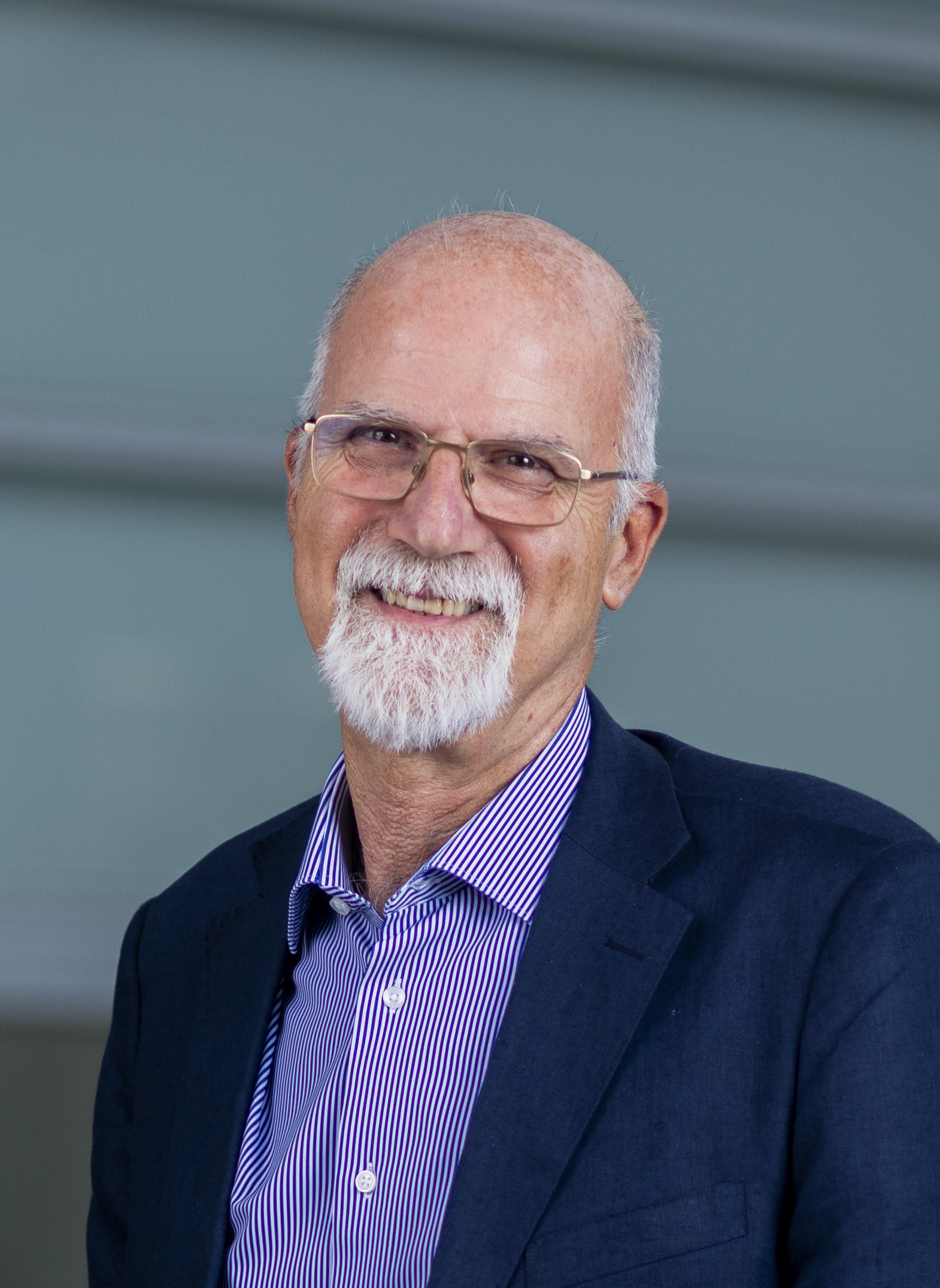
- Born: Maurizio Prato; October 11, 1953 (age 73); Lecce, Italy
- Citizenship: Italy
- Education: University of Padua
- Known for: Chemistry of nanocarbons Prato reaction
- Spouse: Elisabetta Schiavon (m. 1999)
- Children: Two (Carlo, Emma)
- Scientific career
- Fields: Chemistry
- Workplaces: University of Trieste; BiomaGUNE, San Sebastián
- Website: maurizioprato.wixsite.com/maurizioprato www.cicbiomagune.es/org/researchgroups

Maurizio Prato (born in Lecce October 11, 1953), is an Italian Organic Chemist, who is best known for his work on the functionalization of carbon nanostructures, including fullerenes, carbon nanotubes and graphene. He developed a series of organic reactions that make these materials more biocompatible, less or even non toxic, amenable to further functionalization, and easier to manipulate. He is Professor of Organic Chemistry at the University of Trieste and Research Professor at CIC BiomaGUNE in San Sebastián, Spain.

== Education and career ==
Prato received his degree from the University of Padua, Italy. He became assistant professor at the same University and then moved to the University of Trieste, Italy, as associate professor in 1992. He became full professor in Organic Chemistry in 2000. He has been visiting scientist at Yale (Prof. Danishefsky, 1986–87) and in California at Santa Barbara (Prof. Wudl, 1991–92). He has been visiting Professor at the Ecole Normale Superieure de Paris (2001) and at the University of Namur, Belgium (2010). From 2015 prof. Prato is also Ikerbasque professor and AXA Foundation Nanobiotechnology Chair at CIC Biomagune of San Sebastian-Donostia, Spain.

== Scientific Research ==
Maurizio Prato is an organic chemist, equally fluent in material science and nanomedicine. From the beginning of his career, Maurizio Prato used his physical organic and synthetic chemistry backgrounds to expand the horizons of the chemical reactivity of fullerenes.

In 1993, together with M. Maggini and G. Scorrano, he published the first paper on the azomethine ylide cycloaddition to C60, which resulted to be a very useful reaction of functionalization of fullerenes.

In 2002, he extended the same reaction to carbon nanotubes. The reaction is very versatile, consisting in the condensation of an alpha-amino assid and an aldehyde to generate a reactive 1,3-dipole that then adds to a double bond of C60 or CNT, giving a pyrrolidine ring fused to the carbon skeleton. Many alpha-amino acids and aldehydes can be used very efficiently, for a total control of the functionalization process. This addition, later called Prato reaction, was adapted from a very old reaction scheme, originally reported by Huisgen and then developed by many others. Prato and his colleagues were the first to apply it to fullerenes.

Because of its versatility and applicability, this approach paved the way to the use of fullerenes and carbon nanotubes in important applications in fields as different as photovoltaics and drug delivery. In particular, Maurizio Prato, in a longstanding collaboration, initially with Alberto Bianco and later with Kostas Kostarelos, demonstrated the utility of carbon nanotubes to serve as efficient scaffolds for the delivery of vaccines and drugs. Carbon nanotubes are very well suited to act as drug carriers, because of their extraordinary capability to cross cell membranes. This result has thrown open a very active area of research, which explores the applications of CNT in biology and medicine.

In another interesting technological development of functionalized carbon nanotubes, Prato, in collaboration with neurophysiologist Laura Ballerini at the University of Trieste, has used carbon nanotubes as substrates for neuronal growth. Carbon nanotubes integrate in an incredible way with nerve cells, leading to a boost in the spontaneous activity of the neurons. These researchers also found that two isolated slices of spinal cord can restart communicating through a bridge of carbon nanotubes. The implications of this work is that in a (hopefully) not too distant future, carbon nanotubes might be used to repair or replace the function of damaged, altered and severed neurons and neuronal tissue.

Another topic recently developed by prof. Prato focuses on the synthesis and the study of carbon nanodots, quasi-spherical, water-soluble and fluorescent nanoparticles with a diameter < 10 nm. These nanoparticles with a carbonaceous core are very rich in primary aliphatic amine groups on their surface that can be exploited not only for coupling reactions with molecules and/or other nanomaterials but also for catalysis and, interestingly, emission can be tailored through a rational choice of organic precursors.

== Awards ==
- Federchimica Prize, Association of the Italian Chemical Industries (1995)
- National Prize for Research, Italian Chemical Society (2002)
- Ciamician-Gonzalez Prize, Spanish Royal Society of Chemistry (2008)
- Nominee for the Descartes Prize for Excellence in Scientific Collaboration (2006), European Commission
- Recipient of the ERC Advanced Grant (2008), European Research Council
- Mangini Gold Medal, Italian Chemical Society (2009)
- Ree-Natta Lectureship, Korean Chemical Society (2010)
- Member of Accademia Nazionale dei Lincei (National Academy of Sciences of Italy)
- EuCheMS Lecture Award (2013)
- Honorary Professorship, Xi'an Jiaotong University, Xi'an, China (2013)
- Natta Gold Medal, Italian Chemical Society (2014)
- Laurea Honoris Causa in Science and Technology of Materials, University of Roma Tor Vergata (2015)
- European Carbon Association Award (2015)
- French-Italian Chemical Societies Award, French Chemical Society (2015)
- ACS Nano Lectureship Award, American Chemical Society (2015)
- Doctoral degree Honoris Causa, University of Castilla-La Mancha (2016)
- Recipient of the ERC Advanced Grant (2020), European Research Council
- Honorary degree Honoris Causa, University of Salento (2021)
