= Donald Huffman =

American professor of physics (1935–2025)

Donald R. Huffman
- Born: 1935
- Died: November 2, 2025 (aged 89–90)
- Known for: Buckminsterfullerene
- Scientific career
- Fields: Chemist
- Workplaces: University of Arizona

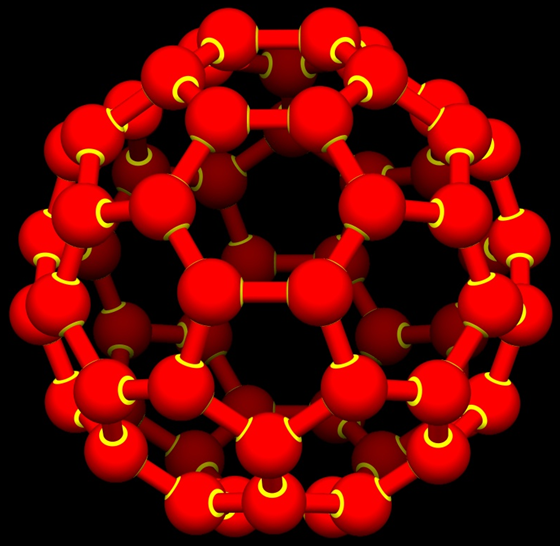
Buckminsterfullerene, C60

Donald R. Huffman (1935 – November 2, 2025) was an American academic Professor Emeritus of Physics at the University of Arizona. With Wolfgang Krätschmer, he developed a technique in 1990 for the simple production of large quantities of C_{60}, or Buckminsterfullerene. Previously, in 1982~1983, he and Krätschmer had found, in a UV spectrum, the first signal of C_{60} ever observed.

Huffman and his team were nominated for the Nobel Prize in Chemistry but didn’t get it due to technicalities.

Huffman was featured prominently in "Race to Catch a Buckyball", a 1995 episode of the Nova documentary series.

Huffman died on November 2, 2025, at the age of 90.

== Bibliography ==
- Bohren, Craig F. and Donald R. Huffman, Absorption and scattering of light by small particles, New York : Wiley, 1998, 530 p., ISBN 0-471-29340-7, ISBN 978-0-471-29340-8

== Awards ==
- Hewlett Packard Europhysics Prize, 1994 (with Wolfgang Kratschmer, Harold Kroto and Richard Smalley)
- Materials Research Society, Gold Medal 1993, For Synthesis and Pioneering Study of Fullerenes

== See also ==
- List of textbooks in electromagnetism
