= Exohedral fullerene =

Type of chemical compound

Exohedral fullerenes, also called exofullerenes, are fullerenes that have additional atoms, ions, or clusters attached their outer spheres, such as C_{50}Cl_{10} and C_{60}H_{8}. or fullerene ligands.

== See also ==
- Endohedral fullerene
