= Cyclohexatriene =

Resonance structures of benzene

1,2,3-Cyclohexatriene

Cyclohexatriene may refer to:

- 1,3,5-Cyclohexatriene and 2,4,6-cyclohexatriene, theoretical resonance isomers of benzene
- 1,2,3-Cyclohexatriene
