= Wolfgang Krätschmer =

German physicist (born 1942)

- Born: 16 November 1942 (age 83); Berlin, Germany
- Education: Max Planck Institute for Nuclear Physics (PhD)
- Known for: honorary professor at the University of Heidelberg
- Notable work: procedure for the synthesis of fullerenes
- Awards: see Honors

Wolfgang Krätschmer (born 16 November 1942 in Berlin) is a German physicist.

Krätschmer studied physics in Berlin. After his Diplom he went to the Max Planck Institute for Nuclear Physics in Heidelberg and earned his PhD there in 1971 with a thesis on artificially etched tracks of accelerated heavy ions in quartz. In his career, he has worked on cosmic-ray heavy-ion tracks in lunar samples, as well as infrared and UV spectra of interstellar dust.

Together with his PhD student Konstantinos Fostiropoulos and with Donald Huffman from the University of Arizona, he developed a procedure for the synthesis of fullerenes. This procedure was the first to produce fullerenes in large amounts for chemical experiments. Since 1993, he is an honorary professor ("Honorarprofessor") at the University of Heidelberg.

== Honors ==
- 1992 – Stern–Gerlach Medal
- 1993 – Gottfried Wilhelm Leibniz Prize
- 1994 – Hewlett-Packard Europhysics Prize
- 2002 – Carl Friedrich Gauss Medaille
- 2008 – Liebig Medal
- 2008 – Honorary doctorate from the University of Basel
- 2010 – European Inventor Award in the "Lifetime Achievement" category awarded by the European Patent Office
