= Superaromaticity =

Concept in theoretical chemistry

In theoretical chemistry, superaromaticity describes the potential for extra thermodynamic stability and unique magnetic properties arising from π-electron delocalization around a large "super-ring" composed of a cyclic array of smaller aromatic rings. The concept is distinct from the common global aromaticity observed in single-ring macrocycles like annulenes.

The question of whether superaromaticity is a real, significant phenomenon has been the subject of a long-standing scientific debate, primarily centered on the molecule kekulene (C_{48}H_{24}). While initial computational studies suggested kekulene possessed this additional stability, subsequent analysis using more advanced methods has led to a scientific consensus that it is a normal benzenoid hydrocarbon with no appreciable superaromatic character.

== The kekulene debate ==
Chemical structure of kekulene

The discussion around superaromaticity is best illustrated by the theoretical analysis of kekulene, a large hydrocarbon made of twelve annelated (fused) benzene rings in a macrocyclic structure. The debate focused on two competing descriptions of its electronic structure: a "benzenoid" model based on Clar's rule, and an "annulenoid" model that implies superaromaticity.

=== Initial proposals for superaromaticity ===
In 1991, Cioslowski and collaborators performed ab initio molecular orbital calculations on kekulene. They concluded that the molecule was stabilized not only by the aromaticity of its individual benzene rings but also by conjugation within the "super-ring" of those rings. They estimated this extra "superaromatic stabilization energy" to be significant, on the order of 25.4–32.9 kcal/mol. This view corresponds to the annulenoid resonance structure of kekulene, where two concentric annulenes ([18]annulene on the inside and [30]annulene on the outside) both satisfy Hückel's rule.

=== Counter-arguments ===
In 1993, Jun-ichi Aihara challenged this conclusion using a method based on chemical graph theory. He defined superaromaticity as the stabilization energy arising from "type-II circuits"—electron pathways that enclose the central cavity of the molecule. By calculating a "superaromatic stabilization energy" (SSE), he found the value for kekulene to be negligibly small and concluded that it was "essentially non-superaromatic." This supported the benzenoid model, where kekulene's stability is almost entirely derived from its six Clar-type aromatic sextets.

=== Further analysis and consensus ===
In a 1996 paper in Angewandte Chemie, Haijun Jiao and Paul von Ragué Schleyer revisited the question using what were then more advanced computational methods, including density functional theory (DFT) and magnetic criteria like nucleus-independent chemical shift (NICS). Their analysis provided multiple lines of evidence against superaromaticity in kekulene:

- Energetic Criteria: Using homodesmotic reactions, they calculated the extra aromatic stabilization energy (ASE) and found it to be negligible (2.5 kcal/mol) or slightly negative, in stark contrast to Cioslowski's earlier estimates.
- Magnetic Criteria: Their most definitive evidence came from NICS calculations. Aromatic systems sustain a diatropic ring current, which results in a negative NICS value at the ring's center. While the individual benzene-like rings of kekulene showed negative NICS values (e.g., -10.8 ppm for the inner-facing rings), the NICS value at the very center of the large cavity was positive (+5.0 ppm). This positive value indicates a paratropic (anti-aromatic) influence, directly contradicting the idea of a global diatropic current required for superaromaticity.

Based on the lack of extra stabilization energy and the decisive magnetic criteria, Jiao and Schleyer concluded that "kekulene is not superaromatic" but is a "normal benzenoid hydrocarbon." This view is now the widely accepted scientific consensus, "[a]lthough super-aromatic influence cannot be completely ruled out".

== Sources ==
- Aihara, Jun-ichi (January 1993). "General Graph Theory of Superaromaticity". Bulletin of the Chemical Society of Japan. 66 (1): 57–61. doi:10.1246/bcsj.66.57.
- Das, Debapratim; Das, Partha Pratim (2024). "Kekulene: The Super Benzene". Futuristic Trends in Chemical, Material Sciences & Nano Technology. Vol. 3. IIP Series. pp. 105–114. ISBN 978-93-5747-683-6.
- Diederich, François; Staab, Heinz A. (1978). "Benzenoid versus Annulenoid Aromaticity: Synthesis and Properties of Kekulene". Angewandte Chemie International Edition in English. 17 (5): 372–374. doi:10.1002/anie.197803721. ISSN 0570-0833.
- Jiao, Haijun; Schleyer, Paul von Ragué (1 November 1996). "Is Kekulene Really Superaromatic?". Angewandte Chemie International Edition. 35 (20): 2383–2386. doi:10.1002/anie.199623831.
- Krygowski, T. M.; Szatylowicz, H. (2015). "Aromaticity: what does it mean?" (PDF). ChemTexts. 1 (3) 12. Bibcode:2015ChTxt...1...12K. doi:10.1007/s40828-015-0012-2. ISSN 2199-3793. PMC 6313370. PMID 30637186.
