= Stergios Logothetidis =

Greek physicist

- Education: Aristotle University of Thessaloniki (1977–1983)
- Scientific career
- Fields: Physics
- Workplaces: Max Planck Institute

Stergios Logothetidis (Greek: Στέργιος Λογοθετίδης; born 9 November 1953) is a Greek physicist and a full time professor at the solid-state physics department of Aristotle University of Thessaloniki. He is the founder and director of the Lab for Thin Films – Nanosystems and Nanometrology (LTFN). The scientific and research activities of LTFN are focused on the areas of: nanotechnology, organic electronics, nanomedicine, nano-bioelectronics and thin films.

== Education and academic career ==
Logothetidis received his degree in Physics (1977), MSc in Electronics (1980) and PhD (1983) at the Aristotle University of Thessaloniki. He worked as a postdoctoral researcher in Max Planck Institute – MPI in Stuttgart (1983-1985), Research Associate at MPI (1985) and at the Synchrotron Radiation Laboratory at BESSY, Berlin (1988-1989). In 1985 he became a Lecturer and later was elected Full Professor (1999) at the Physics Department in Aristotle University of Thessaloniki, while during 2005-2009 he served as Chairman in the same department. His longtime educational activity includes forming and teaching a multitude of courses at undergraduate and postgraduate level and authoring seven books and notes. He is the director and founder of the Interdisciplinary Post-Graduate Program "Nanosciences & Nanotechnologies" of Aristotle University of Thessaloniki since 2003. He was the supervisor of 18 PhD theses and 130 MSc theses, while he coordinates the research of 30 Post-doctoral researchers.

== Research activities ==
Logothetidis's research activity is complemented by over 880 papers and review articles in International Journals and Conferences and over 5000 citations, whereas he has an h-index of 35. He has given more than 130 Invited talks and is a referee in more than 30 International Scientific Journals. He has also published 5 International scientific books and 16 chapters in other books.

== Coordination, administration and management activities ==
Since 1997, he has organized, managed, realized and coordinated several international clusters and consortia from academic, research and industrial entities from Europe and national (European and National R&D projects, Director of the Thematic Research Network NANONET, CEO of Thessaloniki Innovation Zone, Founder and Director of Hellenic Organic and Printed Electronic Association (HOPE-A), member of committees, etc.). He is member of EU ETP in Nanomedicine (ETPN), European Foundation for Clinical Nanomedicine and the American Academy of Nanomedicine. He has organized several International Conferences, Workshops, International Schools, Exhibitions (in Nanotechnologies, Organic Electronics, Materials Science, Nanomedicine, Thin film technology, Technology transfer, etc.). Since 2003, he organizes the International Conference on Nanosciences & Nanotechnologies (ΝΝ), while since 2005 he organizes the International Symposium on Flexible Organic Electronics (ISFOE) and the International Summer School on N&N (ISSON). At 2011, the NN, ISFOE and ISSON were merged to the multi-event NANOTEXNOLOGY which is one of the biggest nanotechnology events in Europe, that gathers every year more than 1200 internationally acknowledged scientists, researchers, entrepreneurs, and students from 55 countries.

== Books ==
- S. Logothetidis, V. Karagkiozaki (2014). Horizons in Clinical Nanomedicine. Pan Stanford Publishing Pte Ltd ISBN 9789814411561
- S. Logothetidis (2014). Nanostructured Materials and Their Applications. Springer-Verlag Berlin and Heidelberg GmbH & Co. KG ISBN 9783642448218
- S. Logothetidis (2014). Nanomedicine and Nanobiotechnology. Springer-Verlag Berlin and Heidelberg GmbH & Co. KG ISBN 9783642432668
- S. Logothetidis (2012). Nanostructured Materials and Their Applications. Springer-Verlag Berlin and Heidelberg GmbH & Co. KG ISBN 9783642222269
- S. Logothetidis (2012). Nanomedicine and Nanobiotechnology. Springer-Verlag Berlin and Heidelberg GmbH & Co. KG ISBN 9783642241802
