= CPC =

CPC may refer to:

== Organizations ==
=== Companies ===
- Canada Post Corporation, the primary postal operator in Canada
- Caspian Pipeline Consortium, consortium and a pipeline to transport Caspian oil to Russia's Black Sea coast
- Consolidated Pastoral Company, an agrifood business in Australia
- Contract Pharmacal Corp. (oldest, largest vitamin tablet manufacturing company in USA)
- Corn Products Company, later CPC International, acquired by Unilever
- CPC (company), British electrical products distribution company
- CPC Corporation, Taiwanese petrochemicals company
- Crescent Purchasing Consortium, a central purchasing body operating in the United Kingdom

=== Education ===
- California Preparatory College, Redlands, California, U.S.
- Cascade Pacific Council, in Scouting in Oregon, U.S.
- Children's Psychiatric Center, in the High Point Schools, U.S.
- College Preparatory Center, by the Saudi Arabian Oil Company, Saudi Aramco

=== Politics ===
==== Communist parties ====
- Communist Party of Canada, the longest-standing Canadian communist party
- Communist Party of Canada (Marxist–Leninist), founded by Hardial Bains
- Communist Party of China, also known as Chinese Communist Party
- Communist Party of Cuba
- Communist Party of Cyprus, former name of the Progressive Party of Working People

==== Other parties ====
- Congress for Progressive Change, a dissolved conservative party in Nigeria
- Congressional Progressive Caucus, group affiliated with the Democratic Party in the US
- Conservative Party of Canada, a conservative party in Canada
- Conservative Party Conference, annual conference of the Conservative Party in the UK

=== Religion ===
- Covenant Presbyterian Church, US Presbyterian church denomination
- Cumberland Presbyterian Church, Presbyterian church denomination
- Montenegrin Orthodox Church (Montenegrin: Crnogorska pravoslavna crkva / Црногорска православна црква)

=== Other organizations ===
- Canadian Parachute Centre, former name of the Canadian Army Advanced Warfare Centre
- Canadian Paralympic Committee, which represents Canadian Paralympic athletes in the International Paralympic Committee and the Parapan American Games
- California Policy Center, a conservative think tank operating in California
- Center for Plant Conservation, a non-profit research organization operating in Canada and the United States
- Charles Perkins Centre, an Australian medical research institute at the University of Sydney
- Climate Prediction Center, a U.S. federal agency that is part of the National Centers for Environmental Prediction
- Coalition of Patriots for Change, coalition of armed groups in the Central African Republic
- Commission for the Prevention of Corruption of the Republic of Slovenia
- Connected Places Catapult, British government agency
- Consumer Protection Committee, Republic of China government agency, Taiwan
- Crisis pregnancy center, type of pregnancy counseling center affiliated with anti-abortion movement

== Science and technology ==
- Calcined petroleum coke, a product resulting from oil refining
- Cape Photographic Catalogue, a star catalogue
- Centrifugal partition chromatography, a chromatography technique
- Cephalosporin C, an antibiotic
- Cetylpyridinium chloride, a compound used in some antiseptic products such as mouthwashes, lozenges etc.
- Choroid plexus cyst, cyst in the brain
- Chromosomal passenger complex, a protein complex that plays a role in cytokinesis
- Circuit protective conductor, in electrical systems; see earthing system
- Common Pointed with Cap, artillery shell; see Shell (projectile) § Common pointed
- Complete blood count
- Compound parabolic concentrator, in optics
- Computer Physics Communications, a scientific journal
- Condensation particle counter, instrument to count aerosol particles
- CPC theory, Currents' Physical Components theory

=== Computing ===
- Amstrad CPC, a home computer of the 1980s
- Cartesian Perceptual Compression, an image file format
- Cost Per Click, internet advertising model used to drive traffic to websites
- Custom PC, a magazine

=== Communications ===
- Calling party control, a signalling scheme in analog telephony

== Transport ==
- Clapham Common tube station, London, by London Underground station code
- CP Air, by ICAO code

== Other uses ==
- Central Product Classification, a product classification for goods and services by the United Nations Statistical Commission
- Certificate of Professional Competence, qualifications for the UK transport and haulage industry
- Civil procedure code or Civil procedure
- Community Patent Convention
- Cooperative Patent Classification, a patent classification jointly developed by the European Patent Office and the United States Patent and Trademark Office
- Country of Particular Concern, to the U.S. State Department
- Certified Professional Coder (CPC®), in healthcare administration
- Piano Concerto No. 1 (Chopin) or Piano Concerto No. 2 (Chopin)
