= Geoset =

GEOSET
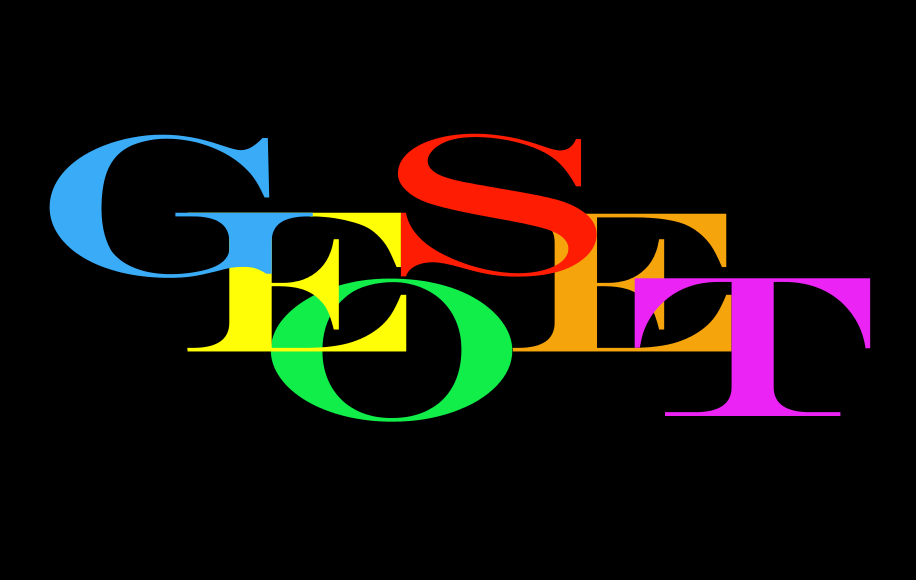
- Type: Educational Initiative
- Founded: 2006
- Founder: Sir Harold Kroto
- Area served: Worldwide
- Key people: Colin Byfleet (Co-Founder); Steve Acquah (Co-Founder & Director); David Simpson (Co-Founder); Penny Gilmer (Co-Founder)
- Services: E-learning, Education
- Website: www.geoset.info, www.geoset.fsu.edu

GEOSET (Global Educational Outreach for Science Engineering and Technology) is a nonprofit educational initiative founded by the Nobel laureate Sir Harold Kroto in 2006 to provide a “free resource of educational material”. Students record presentations detailing their work or interests on a subject matter. The presentations can also form part of course assessment.

The main GEOSET website is a database gateway that links all the contributing institutions and the local site and contains presentations produced at the Florida State University GEOSET Studios. Some of the students who have recorded presentations have been successful in obtaining job offers when showing the video to prospective employers.

== History ==
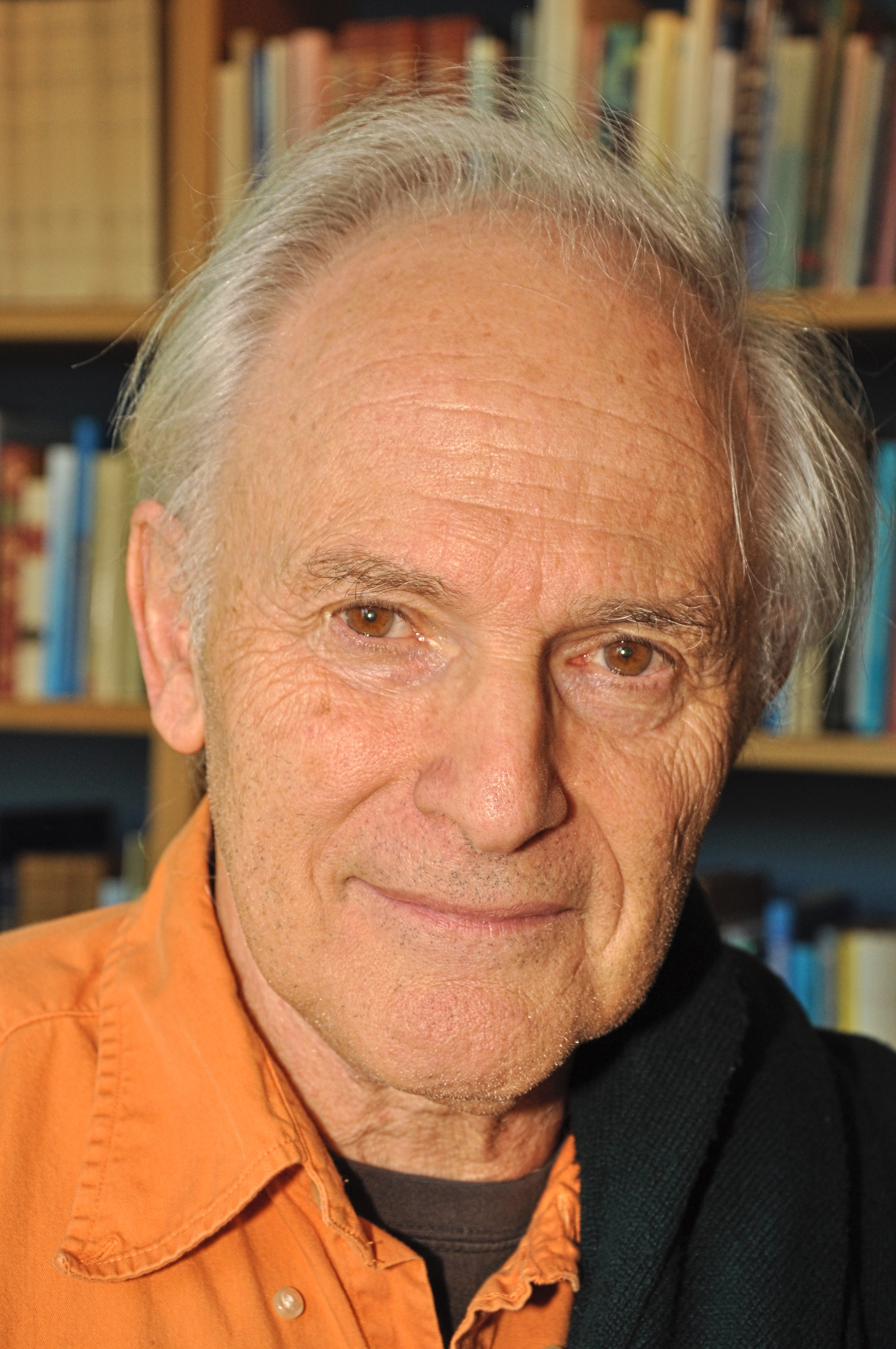
GEOSET founder Sir Harold Kroto.

The inspiration for GEOSET was based on the ability of Google, YouTube and Wikipedia to enable people across the world to access a repository of educational material. Harold Kroto called this revolution the "Goo-You-Wiki World".

Participating organizations and institutions are encouraged to record presentations and create a local site to host them. The URLs from the presentations and representative images are then added to a GEOSET database site. The videos produced make up a series of concepts which teachers are encouraged to use. There are many participating institutions including the University of Sussex, Sheffield University and Toyo University. The initiative has also been demonstrated in the Middle East with the aim of strengthening the resources for science research and in China, with Anhui University of Technology (AHUT) being one of the first to join the GEOSET initiative.

== Technology ==
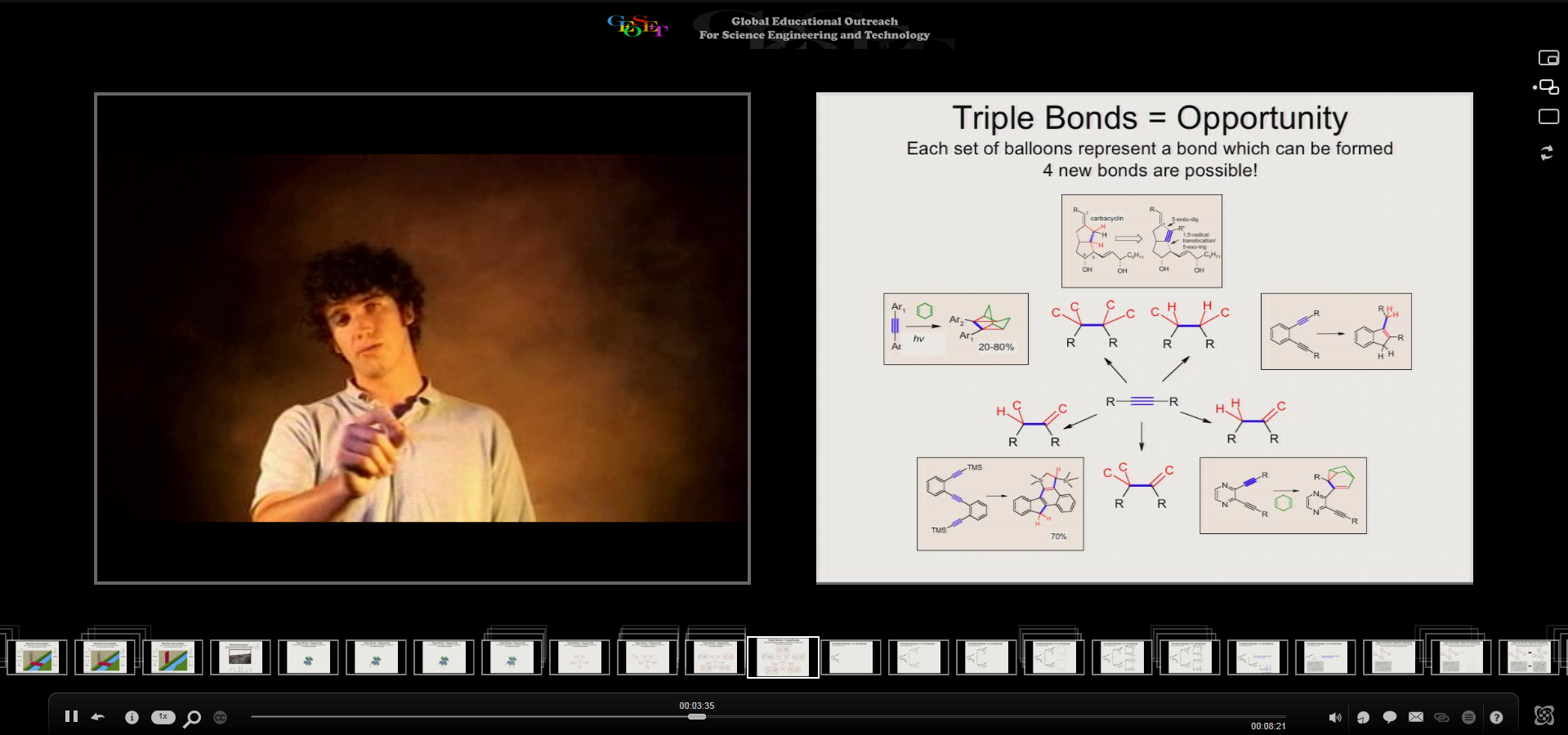
A dual screen recording of a student giving a presentation.

Capture station technology provided by Mediasite is used to record presentations at Florida State University with other rich media formats such as Adobe Presenter and Camtasia Studios. However international partner organizations have used a variety of recording options.

The Florida State University GEOSET facility opened a centralized recording studio in the Paul Dirac Science Library. The studio is primarily student run with Dr. Steve Acquah and Sir Harold Kroto directing. GEOSET is also expanding into South America with a joint technology collaboration with the Universitat Politècnica de València, demonstrating Polimedia instructional technology to government representatives and universities including Uruguay, Colombia, Costa Rica and Peru.

== Recognition ==
In May 2008 GEOSET received a finalist award for the Sonic Foundry Rich Media Impact Awards in the category of Global Reach.

In 2009 GEOSET won the Rich Media Impact Award in the category of Global Reach.

In 2010, GEOSET received $100,000 from Microsoft Research for science education.

In May 2014 GEOSET Studios won the Enterprise Video Award in the category of Educational Scholarship.

== See also ==
- OpenCourseWare
- Crash Course (web series)
- Khan Academy
- MIT OpenCourseWare
