= IBV =

IBV may refer to:

- Institute for Business Value, a unit of Innovation and Research wing of IBM Business Consulting.
- Independent BIOS vendor
- Infectious bronchitis virus, the cause of avian infectious bronchitis, an important poultry disease.
- Influenza B virus, the second most common cause of influenza
- ÍBV Vestmannaeyjar, an Icelandic football club
- Instituto de Biomecánica de Valencia, Valencia Institute of Biomechanics (Spain)
- Internationale Bibelforscher-Vereinigung, German Jehovah's Witnesses's association, suppressed by the Nazis
- Internationalen Berufsringer Verbandes, a German/Austrian professional wrestling promotion which later evolved into the Catch Wrestling Association
