= Bit-Tech =

Online computer hardware magazine

- Website type: Online magazine
- Owner: The Media Team Ltd
- Creator: Vinny Dhir
- Website: bit-tech.net
- Commercial: Yes
- Registration: No
- Current status: Online

Bit-Tech was an online magazine for computer hardware enthusiasts, gamers and case modders, based in the UK. It was founded in 2000, became a fully professional online publication in 2005, and announced its acquisition by Dennis Publishing in October 2008. Dennis Publishing then partnered the site with existing monthly publication Custom PC magazine, making Bit-Tech the online version of the magazine. At this point the two editorial teams were totally integrated. However, due to a restructure in January 2012 the website and magazine had separate editors again, although several of the writers still contributed material to both publications. It is owned by The Media Team.

The website catered specifically for the computer hardware enthusiast market, providing reviews and articles on higher end hardware and games. Bit-Tech was also prominent in the custom case modding scene, providing a focus point for professional and amateur case modders. Much of the site's content and writing style revolved around this particular reader-base, and its regular readers were responsible for some of the most well known case mods, such as Orac3 and the Half-Life 2 mod Black Mesa.

The magazine shut down in 2021.

== History ==
Originally bit-tech.net was designed to be a small site where people who were interested in case modding could see new ideas from the team and discuss them in the forums, due to the relatively small presence of modding at the time.

It diversified and, along with the trend-setting case mods, Bit-Tech also featured detailed reviews of computer hardware and video games, industry news and editorials. There was an increased coverage of console games, though PC games were still the major focus.

Wil Harris was editor-in-chief of Bit-Tech for almost six years and in February 2007, he announced that he was stepping down the end of March 2007 to move onto a fresh challenge. At the time, Wil's successor was not announced and it was not until April 2007 that Tim Smalley announced that he would be taking over as Editor with immediate effect. After Tim had successfully led the site to acquisition by Dennis Publishing in October 2008, he integrated it into the new owner's technology portfolio and then stood down as editor in April 2010 after launching a new consumer technology website at Dennis, Expert Reviews, at the start of the year. Alex Watson took over as Bit-Tech's Editor with immediate effect and was replaced by former deputy editor of Custom PC James Gorbold in December 2010. In January 2012, Dennis publishing restructured the editorial team and Simon Brew took on the role of managing editor of the site. In February 2013, Simon Brew stepped down and Dennis publishing appointed Edward Chester as Editor.

In April 2014 Bit-Tech was acquired by David Ross, who operates HEXUS and BOXFX as brands.

== Modding content ==
Bit-Tech first became known for its community of PC case modders, who modified and decorated computer hardware in a range of custom designs. The site later expanded to include hardware and game reviews while continuing to publish case-modding coverage, including its Mod of the Month and Mod of the Year competitions and project articles. In 2012, Bit-Tech launched the Case Mod Index, a database of computer modifications organized by case manufacturer. The index allowed users to browse projects based on specific computer cases and view complicated builds.

Bit-Tech has been host to several notable mods, including the BlackMesa Mod (currently on show at Valve), Cygnus X1, Anemone Mod, Macro Black and Lian-Li GOO Mod.

== Games reviews ==
Bit-Tech used an arguably more in-depth review model than many other review sites and has a strong focus on PC titles, though console and handheld reviews are increasingly common. Video game reviews do not just provide a commentary of gameplay but also include graphical analysis and a breakdown of how the game will look on different hardware. This review model means that video game reviews are typically much longer than reviews from other sites, though console reviews are a more traditional length.

Bit-Tech employed a percentage scoring system with 'Approved' and 'Premium' awards. Unlike many review sites, Bit-Tech used the full range of this scale and scored poor games harshly, with 50% used to represent average games. While the writing style of the site often leaned towards New Games Journalism, this has mostly been downplayed since the site was bought by Dennis Publishing and the writing style became similar to that of partnered magazine, Custom PC Magazine as the site and magazine were written by the same editorial team.

The magazine moved to embrace the indie games community and ran several features exploring and supporting this side of the PC industry. Several prominent independent developers, including Introversion Software and writers from Free Radical Design have written columns for the site which explore a number of issues in and around the games industry.

In 2011 Bit-Tech's games section was rebranded as bit-gamer and now sits alongside the main site as a separate games website.

== Staff ==
- Editor – Matthew Lambert
- Contributor – Alex Banks (modding content lead)
- Contributor – Rick Lane (games editor, Bit-gamer)
- Contributor – Gareth Halfacree (news editor)
- Contributor – Antony Leather (hardware)
- Doge - Mason Lyons (Good boy)

== See also ==
- Hexus
