= Leszek S. Czarnecki =

Polish-American scientist and engineer

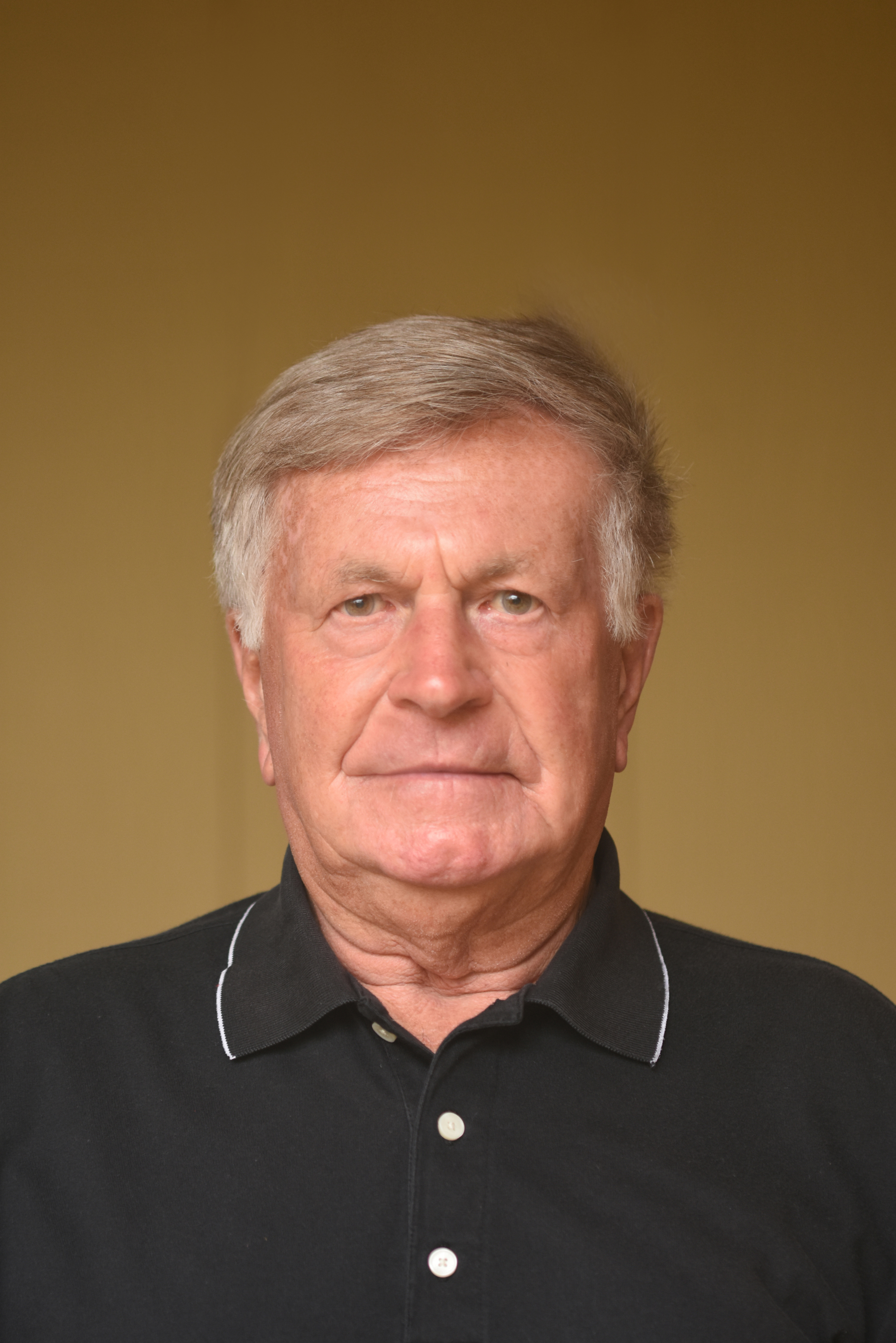
- Leszek S. Czarnecki in 2020
- Born: May 14, 1939 (age 87); Różanka, Poland
- Education: Silesian University of Technology
- Known for: Currents' Physical Components (CPC) Power Theory
- Awards: Knight's Cross of the Order of Merit of the Republic of Poland (1999)
- Scientific career
- Fields: Electrical engineering
- Workplaces: Louisiana State University
- Website: czarnecki.study

Leszek S. Czarnecki (born May 14, 1939) is a Polish-American electrical engineer and professor emeritus at Louisiana State University (LSU). He is known for his work on power theory in electrical circuits, particularly the development of the Currents' Physical Components (CPC) Power Theory.

== Early life and education ==
Czarnecki was born in Poland and earned his Ph.D. in 1969 and later D.Sc. in 1984 from the Silesian University of Technology in Gliwice. His academic foundation laid the groundwork for his later contributions to electrical engineering.

== Academic career ==
From 1984 to 1986, he was a Visiting Research Officer at the National Research Council of Canada. From 1987 to 1989, he served as Associate Professor of Electrical Engineering at the University of Zielona Góra, Poland. In 1989, he joined LSU's Department of Electrical and Computer Engineering. He became a full professor in 1999 and was named Distinguished Professor in 2005. In 2006, he was awarded the title of Professor of Technological Sciences by the President of Poland.

== Research contributions ==
Czarnecki's research focuses on power theory and compensation methods in circuits with nonsinusoidal currents. He is the creator of the CPC Power Theory, which has significantly advanced understanding and practical applications in energy transfer in electrical systems.

In 2023, his book, Powers and Compensation in Circuits with Nonsinusoidal Currents, was published by Oxford University Press, encapsulating decades of research.

== Awards and honors ==
- Life Fellow of the Institute of Electrical and Electronics Engineers (IEEE) (1996)
- Knight's Cross of the Order of Merit of the Republic of Poland (1999)
- Named among the top 2% of world faculty by Stanford University (2021)

== Public activity ==
From 1981, when the Marshal Law was imposed in Poland, and the Solidarity movement was de-legalized, Czarnecki was involved in an underground activity aimed at terminating the communist regime and restoring democracy. In 1998, Czarnecki initiated and supervised with his wife, Maria, the process of the adaptation by the Louisiana Parliament of a Resolution that urged the Senate of the United States to include Poland, the Czech Republic, and Hungary into NATO. This Resolution motivated Senators of Louisiana to the US Congress to vote in favour of that inclusion. For this activity, Czarnecki and his wife Maria were decorated by the President of Poland with the Knight Cross of the Medal of Merit of the Republic of Poland

== Personal life ==
Czarnecki is married to mathematician, Maria, and has two sons, Jakub and Tomasz.

He is also an mountaineer and scuba diver. He was on the team that accomplished first traverse of Rwenzori ridge in Africa in 1975, made a ski traverse od Svalbard in 1977, as well as climbed peaks including Lhotse in the Himalayas in 1979, Cordillera Huayhuash in Andes in 1981, and solo climb of Denali in Alaska 1999.

== Selected Publications ==
- Czarnecki, L. S. (2023). Powers and Compensation in Circuits with Nonsinusoidal Currents. Oxford University Press.
- Czarnecki, L. S. (1983). Additional discussion to Reactive power under nonsinusoidal conditions. IEEE Trans. on Power and Systems, Vol. PAS-102, No. 4.
- Czarnecki, L. S. (1984). Considerations on the reactive power in nonsinusoidal situations. IEEE Trans. Instr. Measurement, Vol. IM-34.
- Czarnecki, L. S. (1987). What is wrong with the Budeanu concept of reactive and distortion power and why it should be abandoned. IEEE Transactions on Instrumentation and Measurement, 36(3), 834-837.
- Czarnecki, L. S. (1988). Orthogonal decomposition of the current in a three-phase non-linear asymmetrical circuit with nonsinusoidal voltage. IEEE Trans. IM., Vol. IM-37, No. 1.
- Czarnecki, L. S. (1989). Reactive and unbalanced currents compensation in three-phase circuits under nonsinusoidal conditions. IEEE Trans. Instr. Measur., Vol. IM-38, No. 3.
- Czarnecki, L. S., Swietlicki T. (1990). Powers in nonsinusoidal networks, their analysis, interpretation, and measurement. IEEE Trans. Instr. Measur., Vol. IM-39, No. 2.
- Czarnecki, L. S. (1997). Budeanu and Fryze: Two frameworks for interpreting power properties of circuits with nonsinusoidal voltages and currents. Archiv fur Elektrotechnik, (81), N. 2.
- Czarnecki, L. S. (1999). Energy flow and power phenomena in electrical circuits: illusions and reality. Archiv fur Elektrotechnik, (82), No. 4.
- Czarnecki, L. S. (2004). On some misinterpretations of the Instantaneous Reactive Power p-q Theory. IEEE Trans. on Power Electronics, Vol. 19, No.3.
- Czarnecki, L. S. (2009). Effect of supply voltage harmonics on IRP-based switching compensator control. IEEE Trans. on Power Electronics, Vol. 24, No. 2.
- Czarnecki, L. S., Haley P. M. (2015). Unbalanced power in four-wire systems and its reactive compensation. IEEE Trans. on Power Delivery, Vol. 30, No. 1,
- Czarnecki, L. S. (2017). Critical comments on the Conservative Power Theory (CPT). Przegląd Elektrotechniczny, R3, No. 1.
- Bhattarai P.D., Czarnecki, L. S. (2017). Currents’ Physical Components (CPC) of the Supply Current of Unbalanced LTI Loads at Asymmetrical and Nonsinusoidal Voltage. Przegląd Elektrotechniczny, R. 93, No. 9.
