= Blanca Rodríguez (disambiguation) =

Blanca Rodriguez (1926–2020) was the first lady of Venezuela in 1974–1979 and 1989–1993.

Blanca Rodriguez or Blanca Rodríguez can also refer to:

- Luisa Moreno (born Blanca Rodriguez, 1907–1992), Guatemalan-American labor and civil rights activist
- Blanca Rodríguez (journalist) (born 1959), Uruguayan journalist and politician
- Blanca Rodriguez (scientist) (active on 21st century), Spanish computer scientist
