= Harry Kroto =

English chemist (1939–2016)

Sir Harry Kroto FRS
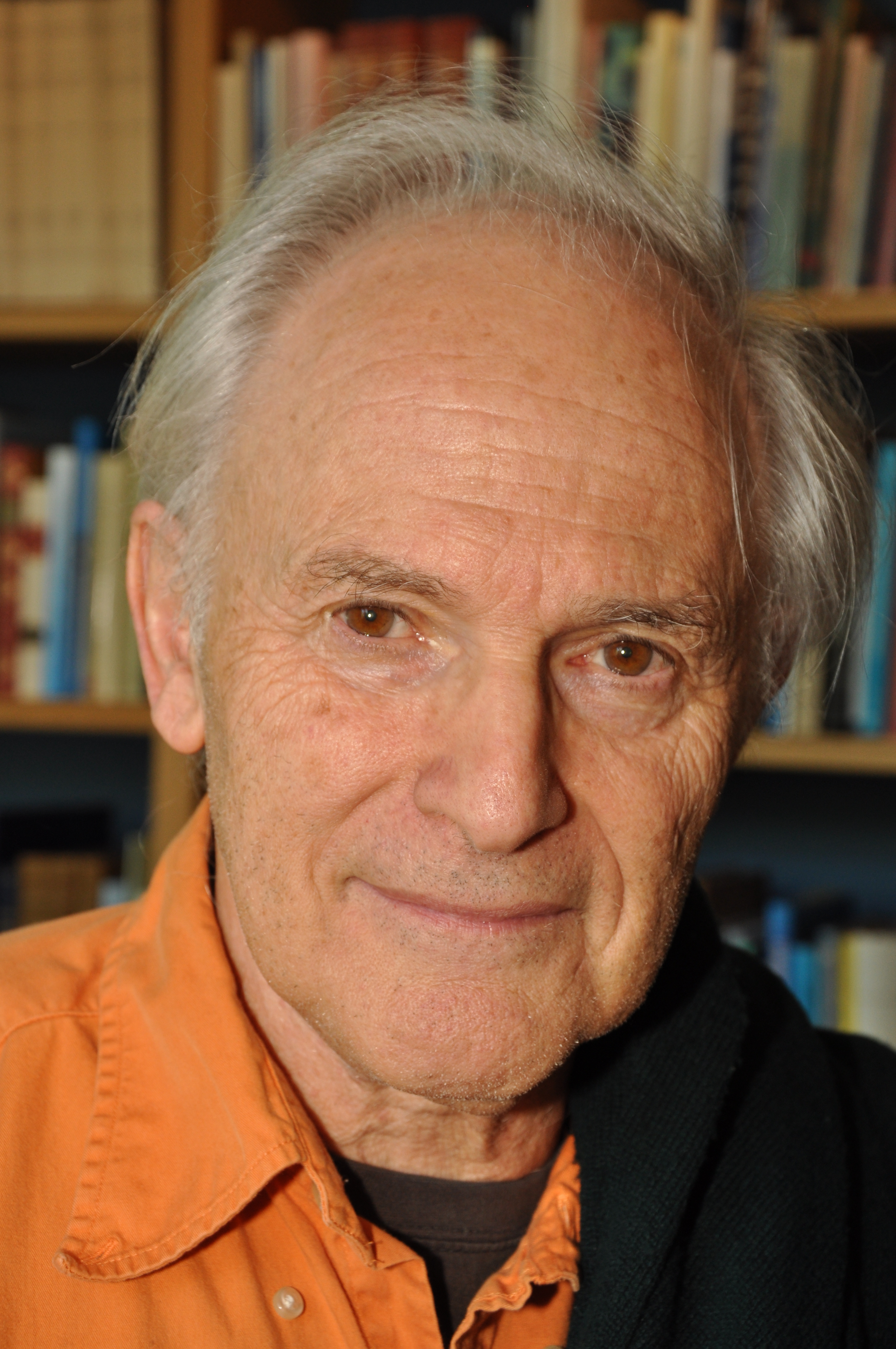
- Kroto in 2011
- Born: Harold Walter Krotoschiner; 7 October 1939; Wisbech, Cambridgeshire, England
- Died: 30 April 2016 (aged 76); Lewes, East Sussex, England
- Education: Bolton School, University of Sheffield
- Known for: Buckminsterfullerene
- Spouse: Margaret Henrietta Hunter (m. 1963)
- Children: 2
- Awards: Nobel Prize in Chemistry (1996); Knight Bachelor (1996); Dalton Medal (1997); Michael Faraday Prize (2001); Copley Medal (2004)
- Scientific career
- Fields: Chemistry
- Institutions: Florida State University; University of Sussex; British Humanist Association
- Thesis: The spectra of unstable molecules under high resolution (1964)
- Doctoral students: Perdita Barran
- Kroto's voice recorded 2014
- Website: kroto.info

Sir Harold Walter Kroto (born Harold Walter Krotoschiner; 7 October 1939 – 30 April 2016) was an English chemist. He shared the 1996 Nobel Prize in Chemistry with Robert Curl and Richard Smalley for their discovery of fullerenes. He was the recipient of many other honors and awards.

Kroto ended his career as the Francis Eppes Professor of Chemistry at Florida State University, which he joined in 2004. Prior to this, he spent approximately 40 years at the University of Sussex.

Kroto promoted science education and was a critic of religious faith.

== Early years ==
Kroto was born in Wisbech, Isle of Ely, Cambridgeshire, England, to Edith and Heinz Krotoschiner, his name being of Silesian origin. His father's family came from Bojanowo, Poland, and his mother's from Berlin. Both of his parents were born in Berlin and fled to Great Britain in the 1930s as refugees from Nazi Germany; his father was Jewish. Harry was raised in Bolton while the British authorities interned his father on the Isle of Man as an enemy alien during World War II. Kroto attended Bolton School, where he was a contemporary of the actor Ian McKellen. In 1955, Harold's father shortened the family name to Kroto.

As a child, he became fascinated by a Meccano set. Kroto credited Meccano, as well as his aiding his father in the latter's balloon factory after World War II – amongst other things – with developing skills useful in scientific research. He developed an interest in chemistry, physics, and mathematics in secondary school, and because his sixth form chemistry teacher (Harry Heaney – who subsequently became a university professor) felt that the University of Sheffield had the best chemistry department in the United Kingdom, he went to Sheffield.

Although raised Jewish, Kroto stated that religion never made any sense to him. He was a humanist who claimed to have three religions: Amnesty Internationalism, atheism, and humour. He was a distinguished supporter of the British Humanist Association. In 2003 he was one of 22 Nobel Laureates who signed the Humanist Manifesto.

In 2015, Kroto signed the Mainau Declaration 2015 on Climate Change on the final day of the 65th Lindau Nobel Laureate Meeting. The declaration was signed by a total of 76 Nobel Laureates and handed to then-President of the French Republic, François Hollande, as part of the successful COP21 climate summit in Paris.

== Education and academic career ==
=== Education ===
Kroto was educated at Bolton School and went to the University of Sheffield in 1958, where he obtained a first-class honours BSc degree in Chemistry (1961) and a PhD in Molecular Spectroscopy (1964). During his time at Sheffield he also was the art editor of Arrows – the university student magazine, played tennis for the university team (reaching the UAU finals twice) and was President of the Student Athletics Council (1963–64). Among other things such as making the first phosphaalkenes (compounds with carbon phosphorus double bonds), his doctoral studies included unpublished research on carbon suboxide, O=C=C=C=O, and this led to a general interest in molecules containing chains of carbon atoms with numerous multiple bonds. He started his work with an interest in organic chemistry, but when he learned about spectroscopy it inclined him towards quantum chemistry; he later developed an interest in astrochemistry.

After obtaining his PhD, Kroto spent two-years as a postdoctoral fellow in the molecular spectroscopy group of Gerhard Herzberg at the National Research Council in Ottawa, Canada, and the subsequent year (1966–1967) at Bell Laboratories in New Jersey carrying out Raman studies of liquid phase interactions and worked on quantum chemistry.

=== Research at the University of Sussex ===
In 1967, Kroto began teaching and research at the University of Sussex in England. During his time at Sussex from 1967 to 1985, he carried out research mainly focused on the spectroscopic studies of new and novel unstable and semi-stable species. This work resulted in the birth of the various fields of new chemistry involving carbon multiply bonded to second and third row elements e.g. S, Se and P. A particularly important breakthrough (with Sussex colleague John Nixon) was the creation of several new phosphorus species detected by microwave spectroscopy. This work resulted in the birth of the field(s) of phosphaalkene and phosphaalkyne chemistry. These species contain carbon double and triple bonded to phosphorus (C=P and C≡P) such as cyanophosphaethyne.

In 1975, he became a full professor of Chemistry. This coincided with laboratory microwave measurements with Sussex colleague David Walton on long linear carbon chain molecules, leading to radio astronomy observations with Canadian astronomers surprisingly revealing that these unusual carbonaceous species exist in relatively large abundances in interstellar space as well as the outer atmospheres of certain stars – the carbon-rich red giants.

=== Discovery of buckminsterfullerene ===
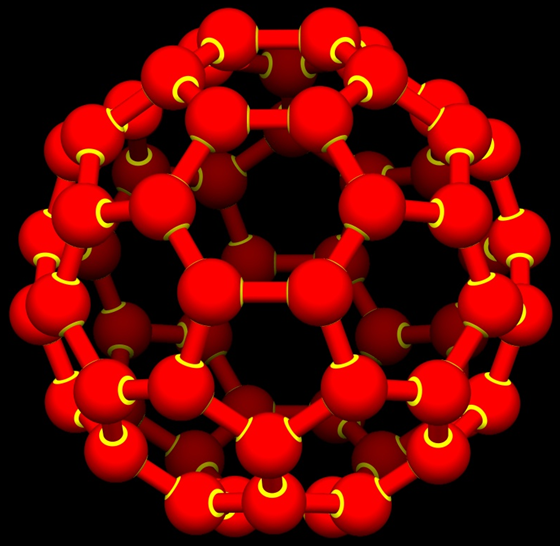
Buckminsterfullerene, C60

In 1985, on the basis of the Sussex studies and the stellar discoveries, laboratory experiments (with co-workers James R. Heath, Sean C. O'Brien, Yuan Liu, Robert Curl and Richard Smalley at Rice University) which simulated the chemical reactions in the atmospheres of the red giant stars demonstrated that stable C_{60} molecules could form spontaneously from a condensing carbon vapour. The co-investigators directed lasers at graphite and examined the results. The C_{60} molecule is a molecule with the same symmetry pattern as a football, consisting of 12 pentagons and 20 hexagons of carbon atoms. Kroto named the molecule buckminsterfullerene, after Buckminster Fuller who had conceived of the geodesic domes, as the dome concept had provided a clue to the likely structure of the new species.

In 1985, the C_{60} discovery caused Kroto to shift the focus of his research from spectroscopy in order to probe the consequences of the C_{60} structural concept (and prove it correct) and to exploit the implications for chemistry and material science.

This research is significant for the discovery of a new allotrope of carbon known as a fullerene. Other allotropes of carbon include graphite, diamond and graphene. Kroto's 1985 paper entitled "C60: Buckminsterfullerene", published with colleagues J. R. Heath, S. C. O'Brien, R. F. Curl, and R. E. Smalley, was honored by a Citation for Chemical Breakthrough Award from the Division of History of Chemistry of the American Chemical Society, presented to Rice University in 2015. The discovery of fullerenes was recognized in 2010 by the designation of a National Historic Chemical Landmark by the American Chemical Society at the Richard E. Smalley Institute for Nanoscale Science and Technology at Rice University in Houston, Texas.

=== Research at Florida State University ===
In 2004, Kroto left the University of Sussex to take up a new position as Francis Eppes Professor of Chemistry at Florida State University. At FSU he carried out fundamental research on: Carbon vapour with Professor Alan Marshall; Open framework condensed phase systems with strategically important electrical and magnetic behaviour with Professors Naresh Dalal (FSU) and Tony Cheetham (Cambridge); and the mechanism of formation and properties of nano-structured systems. In addition, he participated in research initiatives at FSU that probed the astrochemistry of fullerenes, metallofullerenes, and polycyclic aromatic hydrocarbons in stellar/circumstellar space, as well as their relevance to stardust.

=== Educational outreach and public service ===
In 1995, he jointly set up the Vega Science Trust, a UK educational charity that created high quality science films including lectures and interviews with Nobel Laureates, discussion programmes, careers and teaching resources for TV and Internet Broadcast. Vega produced over 280 programmes, that streamed for free from the Vega website which acted as a TV science channel. The trust closed in 2012.

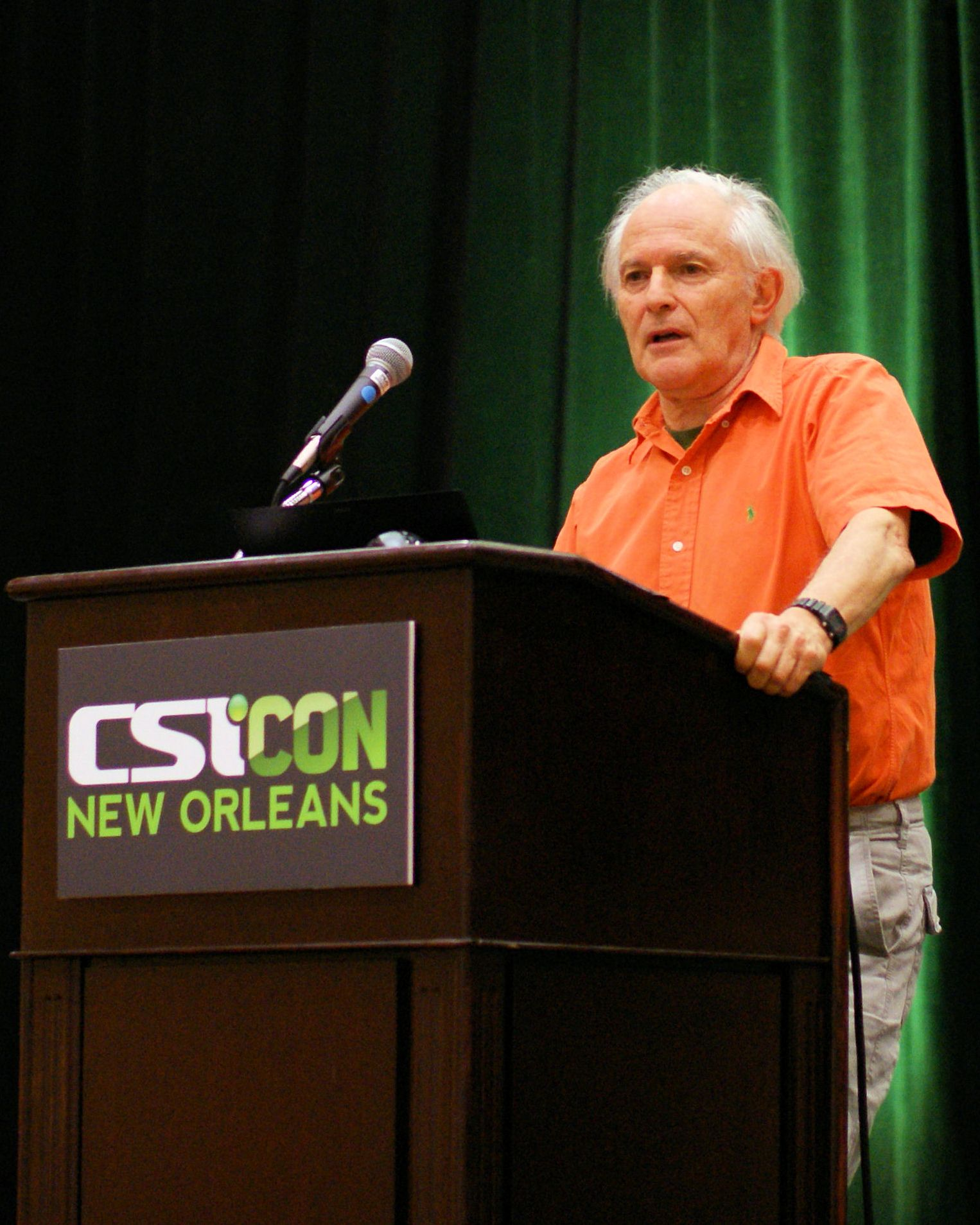
Sir Harold Kroto at CSICon 2011

In 2009, Kroto led the development of a second science education initiative, Geoset. Short for the Global Educational Outreach for Science, Engineering and Technology, GEOSET is an online cache of recorded teaching modules that are freely downloadable to educators and the public. The program aims to increase knowledge of the sciences by creating a global repository of educational videos and presentations from leading universities and institutions.

In 2003, prior to the Blair/Bush invasion of Iraq on the pretext that Iraq had weapons of mass destruction, Kroto initiated and organised the publication of a letter to be signed by a dozen UK Nobel Laureates and published in The Times. It was composed by his friend the Nobel Peace Prize Laureate the late Sir Joseph Rotblat and published in The Times on 15 February 2003.

He wrote a set of articles, mostly opinion pieces, from 2002 to 2003 for the Times Higher Education Supplement, a weekly UK publication.

From 2002 to 2004, Kroto served as president of the Royal Society of Chemistry. In 2004, he was appointed to the Francis Eppes Professorship in the chemistry department at Florida State University, carrying out research in nanoscience and nanotechnology.

He spoke at Auburn University on 29 April 2010, and at the James A. Baker III Institute for Public Policy at Rice University with Robert Curl on 13 October 2010.

In October 2010, Kroto participated in the USA Science and Engineering Festival's Lunch with a Laureate program where middle and high school students had the opportunity to engage in an informal conversation with a Nobel Prize–winning scientist.

He spoke at Mahatma Gandhi University, at Kottayam, in Kerala, India in January 2011, where he was an 'Erudite' special invited lecturer of the Government of Kerala, from 5 to 11 January 2011.

Kroto spoke at CSICon 2011, a convention "dedicated to scientific inquiry and critical thinking" organized by the Committee for Skeptical Inquiry in association with Skeptical Inquirer magazine and the Center for Inquiry. He also delivered the IPhO 2012 lecture at the International Physics Olympiad held in Estonia.

In 2014, Kroto spoke at the Starmus Festival in the Canary Islands, delivering a lecture about his life in science, chemistry, and design.

== Personal life ==
In 1963, Kroto married Margaret Henrietta Hunter, also a student of the University of Sheffield at the time. The couple had two sons. Throughout his life, Kroto was a lover of film, theatre, art, and music and published his own artwork.

=== Personal beliefs ===
Kroto was a "devout atheist" who thought that beliefs in immortality derive from lack of the courage to accept human mortality. He was a patron of the British Humanist Association. He was a supporter of Amnesty International. He referred to his view that religious dogma causes people to accept unethical or inhumane actions: "The only mistake Bernie Madoff made was to promise returns in this life." He held that scientists had a responsibility to work for the benefit of the entire species. On 15 September 2010, Kroto, along with 54 other public figures, signed an open letter published in The Guardian, stating their opposition to Pope Benedict XVI's state visit to the UK.

Kroto was an early Signatory of Asteroid Day.

In 2008, Kroto was critical of Michael Reiss for directing the teaching of creationism alongside evolution.

Kroto praised the increase of organized online information as an "Educational Revolution" and named it as the "GooYouWiki" world referring to Google, YouTube and Wikipedia.

=== Graphic design ===
The discovery of buckminsterfullerene caused Kroto to postpone his dream of setting up an art and graphic design studio – he had been doing graphics semi-professionally for years. However, Kroto's graphic design work resulted in numerous posters, letterheads, logos, book/journal covers, medal design, etc. He produced artwork after receiving graphic awards in the Sunday Times Book Jacket Design competition (1964) and the Moet Hennesy/Louis Vuitton Science pour l'Art Prize (1994). Other notable graphical works include the design of the Nobel UK Stamp for Chemistry (2001) and features at the Royal Academy (London) Summer Exhibition (2004).

=== Death and reactions ===
Kroto died on 30 April 2016 in Lewes, East Sussex, from complications of amyotrophic lateral sclerosis at the age of 76.

Richard Dawkins wrote a memorial for Kroto in which he mentioned Kroto's "passionate hatred of religion." The Wall Street Journal described him as "(spending much of his later life) jetting around the world to extol scientific education in a world he saw as blinded by religion." Slate's Zack Kopplin related a story about how Kroto gave him advice and support to fight Louisiana's creationism law, a law that allows public school science teachers to attack evolution and how Kroto defended the scientific findings of global warming. In an obituary published in the journal Nature, Robert Curl and James R. Heath described Kroto as having an "impish sense of humour similar to that of the British comedy group Monty Python".

== Honours and awards ==
Kroto won numerous awards, individually and with others:

=== Major awards ===
- Tilden Lecturer of the Royal Society of Chemistry, 1981–82
- Elected a Fellow of the Royal Society (FRS) in 1990
- International Prize for New Materials American Physical Society, 1992 (with Robert Curl and Richard Smalley)
- Italgas Prize for Innovation in Chemistry, 1992
- Royal Society of Chemistry Longstaff Medal, 1993
- Hewlett Packard Europhysics Prize, 1994 (with Wolfgang Kraetschmer, Don Huffman and Richard Smalley)
- Nobel Prize in Chemistry, 1996 (shared with Robert Curl and Richard Smalley)
- Carbon Medal, American Carbon Society Medal for Achievement in Carbon Science, 1997 (shared with Robert Curl and Richard Smalley)
- Blackett Lectureship (Royal Society), 1999
- Faraday Award and Lecture (Royal Society), 2001
- Dalton Medal from the Manchester Literary and Philosophical Society, 1997
- Erasmus Medal of Academia Europaea, 2002
- Copley Medal of the Royal Society, 2002
- Golden Plate Award of the American Academy of Achievement, 2002
- Order of Cherubini (Torino), 2005
- Foreign Associate of the National Academy of Sciences, 2007
- Kavli Lecturer, 2007
- National Historic Chemical Landmark, American Chemical Society, 2010.
- Citation for Chemical Breakthrough Award, Division of History of Chemistry, American Chemical Society, 2015

Kroto was made a Knight Bachelor in the 1996 New Year Honours list.

The University of Sheffield North Campus contains two buildings named after Kroto: The Kroto Innovation Centre and the Kroto Research Institute.

=== Honorary degrees ===
1. Université Libre de Bruxelles (Belgium)
2. University of Stockholm (Sweden)
3. University of Limburg (now Hasselt University) (Belgium)
4. University of Sheffield (UK)
5. University of Kingston (UK)
6. University of Sussex (UK)
7. University of Helsinki (Finland)
8. University of Nottingham (UK)
9. Yokohama City University (Japan)
10. University of Sheffield-Hallam (UK)
11. University of Aberdeen (Scotland)
12. University of Leicester (UK)
13. University of Aveiro (Portugal)
14. University of Bielefeld (Germany)
15. University of Hull (UK)
16. Manchester Metropolitan University (UK)
17. Hong Kong City University (HK China)
18. Gustavus Adolphus College (Minnesota, US)
19. University College London (UK)
20. University of Patras (Greece)
21. University of Dalhousie (Halifax, NovaScotia, Canada)
22. University of Strathclyde (Scotland)
23. University of Manchester (UK)
24. AGH University of Science and Technology in Kraków (Poland)
25. University of Durham (UK)
26. Queens University Belfast (NI)
27. University of Surrey (UK)
28. Polytechnico di Torino (Italy)
29. University of Chemical Technology – Beijing (China)
30. University of Liverpool (UK)
31. Florida Southern College (US)
32. Keio University (Japan)
33. University of Chiba (Japan)
34. University of Bolton (UK)
35. University of Hartford (US)
36. University of Tel Aviv (Israel)
37. University of Poitiers (France)
38. Universidad Complutense de Madrid
39. Naresuan University (Thailand)
40. Vietnam National University (Hanoi)
41. University of Edinburgh (Scotland)
42. University of Primorska (Slovenia)

Returned due to closure of Chemistry Departments

1. Hertfordshire University
2. Exeter University

== See also ==
- List of Jewish Nobel laureates
