= Marcela Miró =

Spanish politician (1952–2024)

President of the Corts Valencianes
- In office 9 July 1999 – 12 June 2003
- Preceded by: Héctor Villalba
- Succeeded by: Julio de España Moya

Minister of Social Welfare of the Valencian Community
- In office 24 February 1997 – 23 July 1999
- President: Eduardo Zaplana
- Preceded by: Position created
- Succeeded by: María Carmen Mas Rubio

Minister of Education, Culture and Science of the Valencian Community
- In office 7 May 1996 – 24 February 1997
- President: Eduardo Zaplana
- Preceded by: Fernando Villalonga Campos
- Succeeded by: Francisco Camps

Member of the Corts Valencianes
- In office 13 June 1999 – 25 May 2003

Personal details
- Born: Marcela Miró Pérez; 19 January 1952 Valencia, Spain
- Died: 14 July 2024 (aged 72) Valencia, Spain
- Party: People's Party of the Valencian Community
- Profession: Agricultural engineer

Marcela Miró Pérez (19 January 1952 – 14 July 2024) was a Spanish agricultural engineer, academic, and politician who was a member of the People's Party of the Valencian Community (PPCV). She served as the President of the Corts Valencianes, the regional legislature of the Valencian Community, from July 1999 until June 2003. Miró was the first woman to hold the presidency of the Corts Valencianes.

She also served as regional Minister of Education, Culture and Science from 1996 to 1997 and Minister of Social Affairs from 1997 until 1999 within government of former President of the Valencian Government Eduardo Zaplana.

== Biography ==
Miró was born on 19 January 1952 and had three children.

She graduated from the School of Agricultural Engineers at the Technical University of Valencia (UPV) in 1975 as the number one student out of a class of 400. She was one of just two women in her graduating university class. Miró then became teacher at her alma mater, Technical University of Valencia. She was promoted to associate professor in 1983 and became a full professor in 1989. She became deputy director of studies at UPV's School of Agricultural Engineers from 1986 to 1995 and vice-rector for student services for all of Technical University of Valencia.

Miró, who was previously an independent, joined the People's Party of the Valencian Community (PPCV) in 1995. She quickly rose through the PP's leadership. In 1996, she became the vice president of PPCV's office of external relations and was appointed Minister of Culture, Education and Sports by then-Valencian Community President Eduardo Zaplana. She then served as regional Minister for Social Affairs from 1997 to 1998, also under Zaplana.

In 1999, Miró became the first woman to serve as the President of the Corts Valencianes and presided over the chamber's 5th legislature from 1999 until 2003. Her presidency coincided with the creation of the new Acadèmia Valenciana de la Llengua (Valencian Academy of the Language) by the Corts Valencianes, in which she was a key political supporter.

Following her term as President of the Corts Valencianes, Miró joined Chamber of Auditors of the Valencian Community, or Comptes. She served in the Auditors office from 2003 until her death in 2024.

Miró died following a long illness in Valencia, on 14 July 2024, at the age of 72.
