= María José García Jiménez =

Spanish politician (born 1969)

Deputy at the Corts Valencianes
- Incumbent
- Assumed office June 13, 2015 Valencia (Spanish Congress Electoral District)

Personal details
- Born: March 20, 1969 (age 57) Villacarrillo, Andalusia
- Party: Ciudadanos – Partido de la Ciudadanía
- Profession: Politician

María José García Jiménez (born March 20, 1969) is a Valencian politician, deputy at the Corts Valencianes for the IXth legislature.

== Biography ==
She is graduated in technical engineering of public works from the Universidad Politécnica de Valencia. She works as a teacher of secondary education in alternative energies. She has also worked as an adviser for the recognition of professional competitions purchased in labour experience.

Politically, she was a member of the Liberal Democratic Centre (CDL), party with which she worked as a councillor of the city council of Alcàsser in 2013. She took part in the I Congress of CDL of February 2014 in which was agreed their integration to the party Citizen – Party of the Citizenship. She was chosen deputy at the elections to the Corts Valencian of 2015.
