= Blanca Rodriguez (scientist) =

Spanish computer scientist and academic

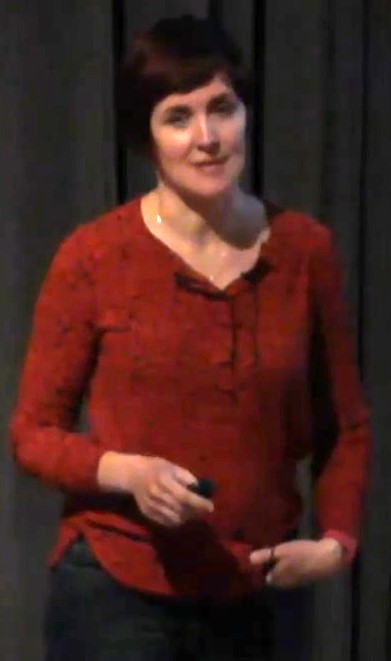
- Rodriguez lectures in 2016
- Born: Valencia
- Education: University of Valencia
- Scientific career
- Workplaces: University of Oxford; Tulane University

Blanca Rodriguez is a Spanish computer scientist who is Professor of Computational Medicine, Wellcome Trust Senior Research Fellow and head of computational biology at the University of Oxford. Her research considers the development of in silico models for drug discovery and digital twins for the identification of innovative therapies.

== Early life and education ==
Rodriguez is from Valencia. She studied engineering at the Technical University of Valencia. As a student, Rodriguez knew nothing about cardiology, but she attended a talk by an arrhythmia specialist. She decided to pursue a career in research, and completed a doctorate in computational biology. She moved to Tulane University for her postdoctoral research, where she spent two years before moving to the University of Oxford as postdoc in St Cross College.

== Research and career ==
Rodriguez was made a professor at Oxford in 2007. She leads the Computational Cardiovascular Science Team, where she develops methodologies for advanced therapeutics. Rodriguez studies the causes and modulators of differences in human pathophysiology. Her early work considered the mechanisms that underpinned cardiac arrhythmias and their diagnosis. Cardiac arrhythmias impact large numbers of people worldwide and can have several causes, including mutations, disease and drugs. Rodriguez uses computational modelling and simulation to identify new treatment pathways for cardiac arrhythmia.

Rodriguez has developed digital twins for precision medicine and in silico trials for new therapies. In silico methodologies can be used for drug development, and digital twins can eliminate the need for animals in research.

In 2015 she was appointed to the Board of the National Centre for the Replacement, Refinement and Reduction of Animals in Research.

== Awards and honours ==
- 2012 MRC Centenary Award
- 2013 Wellcome Trust Senior Research Fellowship in Biomedical Sciences
- 2017 NC3Rs International Prize
- 2018 MPLS Impact Award
- 2018 AWS Machine Learning Research Award

== Selected publications ==
- Britton, Oliver; Alfonso Bueno-Orovio; Karel Van Ammel; Hua Rong Lu; Rob Towart; David J Gallacher; Rodriguez, Blanca (2013). "Experimentally calibrated population of models predicts and explains intersubject variability in cardiac cellular electrophysiology". Proceedings of the National Academy of Sciences of the United States of America. 110 (23): E2098-105. Bibcode:2013PNAS..110E2098B. doi:10.1073/pnas.1304382110. PMC 3677477. PMID 23690584. Wikidata Q36915566.
- Joe Pitt-Francis; Pras Pathmanathan; Miguel O. Bernabeu; et al. (2009). "Chaste: A test-driven approach to software development for biological modelling". Computer Physics Communications. 180 (12): 2452–2471. doi:10.1016/j.cpc.2009.07.019. Zbl 1197.68038. Wikidata Q57014644.
- Marco Viceconti; Francesco Pappalardo; Blanca Rodriguez; Marc Horner; Jeff Bischoff; Flora Musuamba Tshinanu (2020). "In silico trials: Verification, validation and uncertainty quantification of predictive models used in the regulatory evaluation of biomedical products". Methods. doi:10.1016/j.ymeth.2020.01.011. PMC 7883933. PMID 31991193. Wikidata Q92997724.
