= Technical University of Valencia =

Spanish University

- Universitat Politècnica de València
- Type: Public
- Established: 1971
- Affiliations: Vives network T.I.M.E. Sgroup; CESAER; ENHANCE Alliance; SSU
- Budget: €405 million (2023)
- Rector: José E. Capilla Romá
- Faculty: 2,600
- Administrative staff: 1,700
- Students: 28,700
- Location: Valencia, Valencian Community, Spain; 39°28′53.95″N 0°20′37.71″W
- Website: www.upv.es

University rankings

Global – Overall
- ARWU World: 401–500 (2023)
- QS World: 422 (2026)
- THE World: 601–800 (2024)
- USNWR Global: =570 (2023)

The Technical University of Valencia (Valencian: Universitat Politècnica de València; IPA: [univeɾsiˈtat poliˈtɛɡnika ðe vaˈlensi.a], Spanish: Universidad Politécnica de Valencia), shortened to UPV, is a Spanish university located in Valencia, with a focus on science, technology, and arts. It was founded in 1968 as the Higher Polytechnic School of Valencia and became a university in 1971, but some of its schools are more than 100 years old.

== Characteristics ==
The Technical University of Valencia consists of three campuses: (Valencia, Gandia and Alcoy) and 13 schools and faculties: School of Civil Engineering (1972), School of Architecture (1972), School of Industrial Engineering (1972), School of Agricultural Engineering and the Environment (1972), School of Building Engineering (1972), School of Design Engineering (1972), Higher Polytechnic School of Alcoi (1972), Faculty of Fine Arts (1978), School of Informatics (1982), School of Telecommunication Engineering (1989), Higher Polytechnic School of Gandia (1993), School of Engineering in Geodesy, Cartography and Surveying (1994), and Faculty of Business Administration and Management (1999).

The university offers 53 bachelor's and master's degrees and 32 doctoral programs.

== Publications ==
- Loggia (full title: Loggia, Arquitectura & Restauración; web page see here), a "journal specialised in the restoration & preservation of architectural heritage" published since 1996, has reached No. 37 in January 2024.

== Notable alumni ==
- Victoria Francés (born 1982), illustrator.
- Santiago Calatrava (born 1951), architect and structural engineer.
- Rosa Visiedo Claverol (living), Chancellor of CEU Cardinal Herrera University
- María José García Jiménez (born 1969), politician
- Enrique Lores (born 1965), business executive and CEO of HP Inc.
- Iker Marcaide (born 1982), industrial engineer, founder of Flywire and Zubi Group.
- Marcela Miró (1952–2024), class of 1975, agricultural engineer and politician, first woman to serve as President of the Corts Valencianes (1999–2003)
- Joan Ribó (born 1947), mayor of Valencia, 2015–2023.
- Nuria Roca (born 1972), television presenter.
- Miguel Ferrando-Rocher (born 1985), telecommunications engineer, IEEE Global Ambassador and MAX Award-winning theatre director.
- Blanca Rodriguez, computer scientist who is Professor of Computational Medicine, Wellcome Trust Senior Research Fellow and head of computational biology at the University of Oxford
- Fernando Guallar (born 1989), actor.

== See also ==
- Instituto de Biomecánica de Valencia
- Instituto Universitario de Restauración del Patrimonio of the Universitat Politècnica de València
- Polimedia
- Xarxa Vives d'Universitats
