= Llanos Massó =

Spanish politician (born 1965)

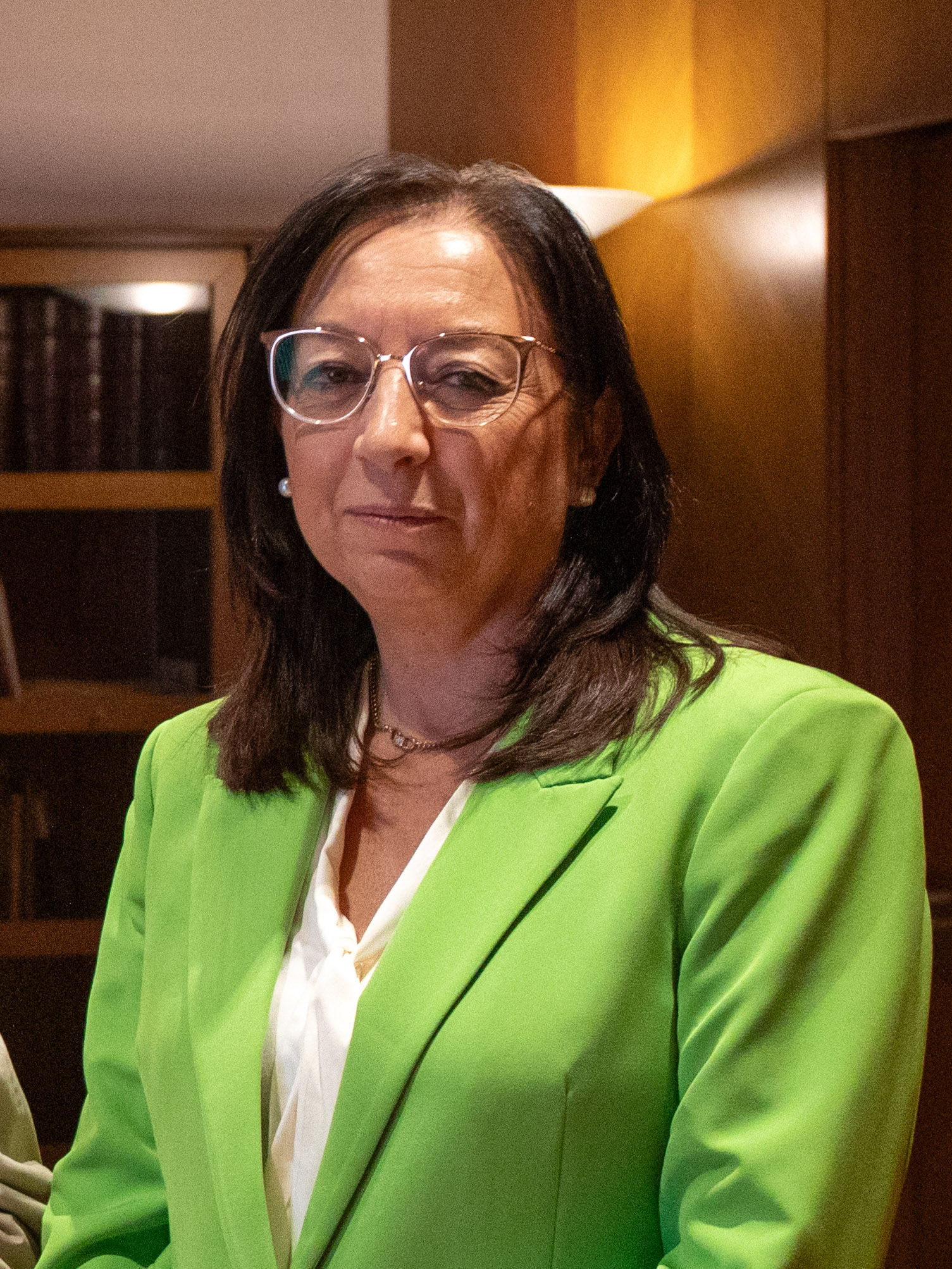
- Massó in 2023

President of the Corts Valencianes
- Incumbent
- Assumed office 26 June 2023
- Preceded by: Enric Morera i Català

Member of the Corts Valencianes
- Incumbent
- Assumed office 16 May 2019
- Constituency: Castellón

Personal details
- Born: 1965 (age 60–61)
- Party: Vox (since 2015)
- Children: 2
- Education: University of Alicante

María de los Llanos Massó Linares (born 1965) is a Spanish politician serving as a member of the Corts Valencianes since 2019. She has served as president of the Corts since 2023.
