= Case modding =

Modifications to a computer to add or remove extra hardware

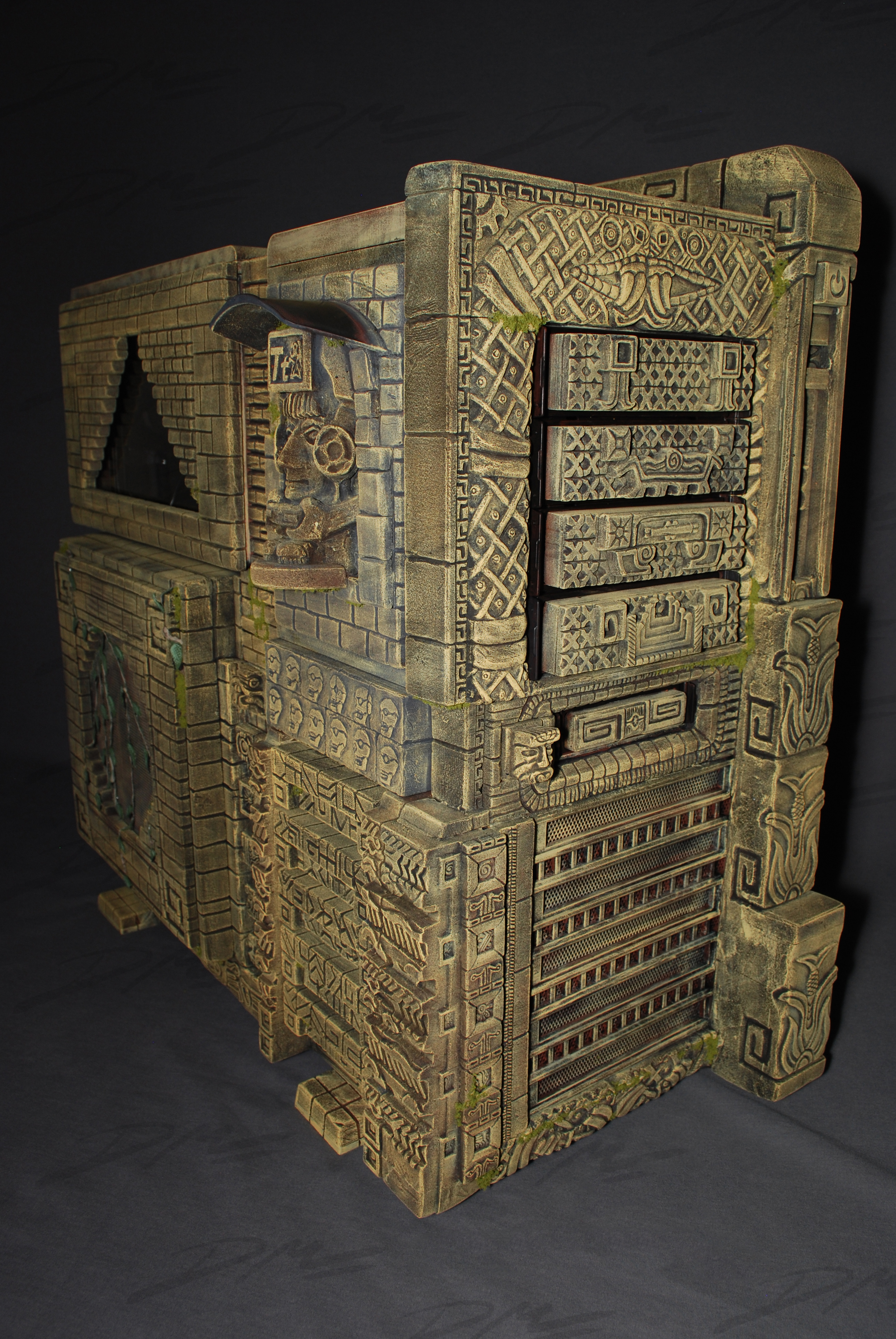
AzTtec, winner of the CPU magazine "Mad Reader Mod" contest, the Custom PC Magazine "Mod of the Month" contest, and a Thermaltake/Modder's-Inc contest in 2011

Case modification, commonly referred to as case modding, is the modification of a computer case or a video game console chassis. Modifying a computer case in any non-standard way is considered a case mod. Modding is done, particularly by hardware enthusiasts, to show off a computer's apparent power by showing off the internal hardware, and also to make it look aesthetically pleasing to the owner.

Cases may also be modified to improve a computer's performance; this is usually associated with cooling and involves changes to components as well as the case.

== History ==
When personal computers first became available to the public, the majority were produced in simple, beige-colored cases. This design is sometimes referred to be as a beige box. Although this met the purpose of containing the components of the personal computer, many users considered their computers as "tacky" or "dull", and some began modifying their existing chassis, or building their own from scratch. One of the original case mods is the "Macquarium", which consists of replacing the CRT screen in a Compact Macintosh case with a fishbowl.

A new market for third-party computer cases and accessories began to develop, and today cases are available in a wide variety of colors and styles. Today the business of "modding" computers and their cases is a profitable endeavor, and bespoke DIY competitions are commonplace. Since 2017, computer hardware companies have started to offer some of their products with built-in RGB LED lighting, replacing earlier non-RGB LED (single color LED) lighting. Non-RGB LED lighting started to replace earlier CCFL-based (mixed with single color LEDs) lighting, starting in the late 2000s and early 2010s.

== Common modifications ==
=== Appearance ===
==== Peripheral mods ====
Peripherals like the keyboard, mouse, and speakers are sometimes painted or otherwise modified to match the computer. Some system builders, in an effort to make their system more portable and convenient, install speakers and small screens into the case.

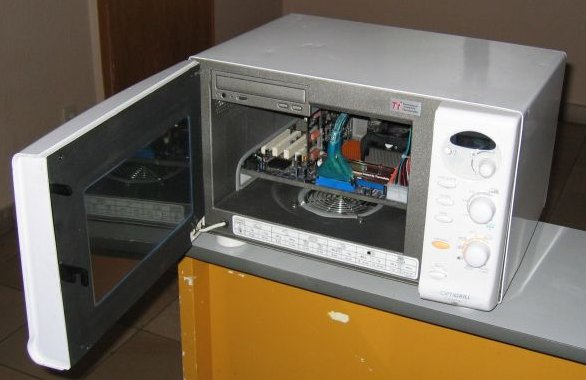
Computer built into a Microwave oven

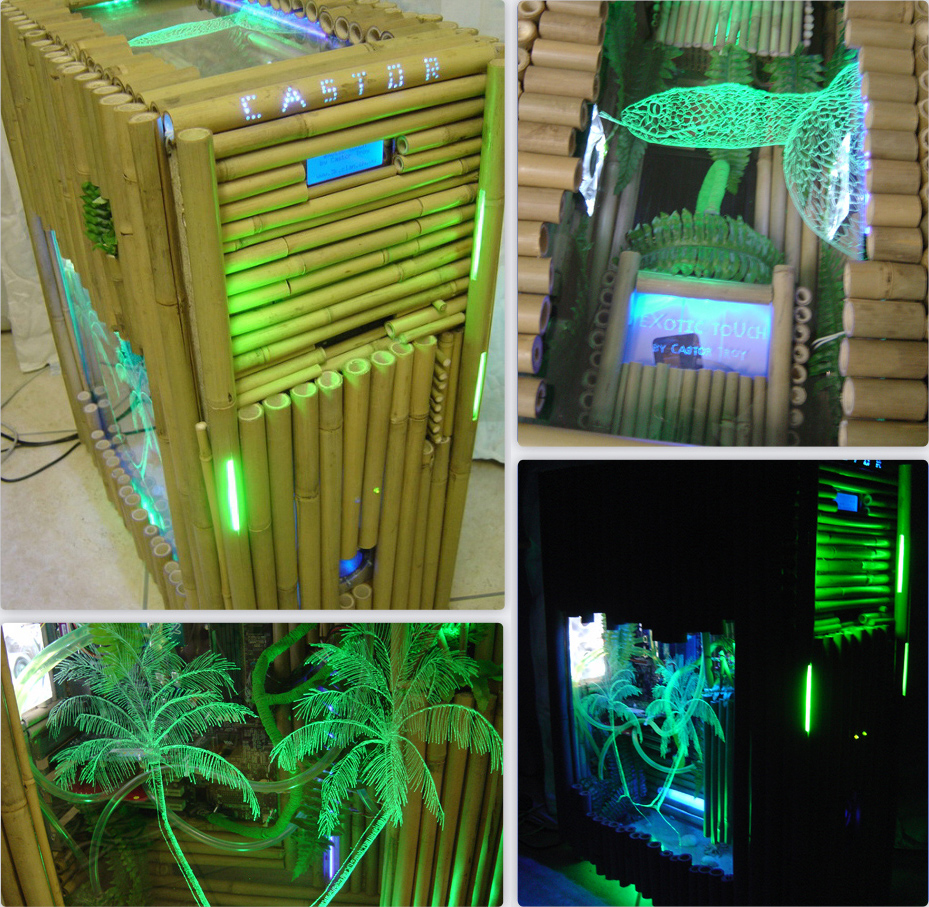
A bamboo custom case

==== Case building ====
Sometime modders build entire cases from scratch. Some may attempt to treat the case as a work of art. Others make it look like or appear to be something else, like a teddy bear, wooden cabinet, a shelf mounted on a wall, or antique equipment such as a Macintosh Plus or an old Atari 2600 video game console. Relatively few case modders or builders make their computer cases from scratch; those who do sometimes put hundreds of hours into their work. The WMD case, Project Nighthawk, and Dark Blade case are a few examples of professional cases built from scratch.

==== Component modding ====
This type of modding, as the name suggests, involves modifying the PC components themselves for a perceived improvement in appearance. An example is the relocation of buttons on optical drives. This is often done in combination with "stealthing", which hides the drive's visibility by masking it with a blank face. A riskier modification is installing hard drive windows which show the platters and mechanism, which must be done in a clean room without significant dust. Few people have attempted it and results seem to vary. Some hard drives, including the WD Raptor, now come with a window as standard.

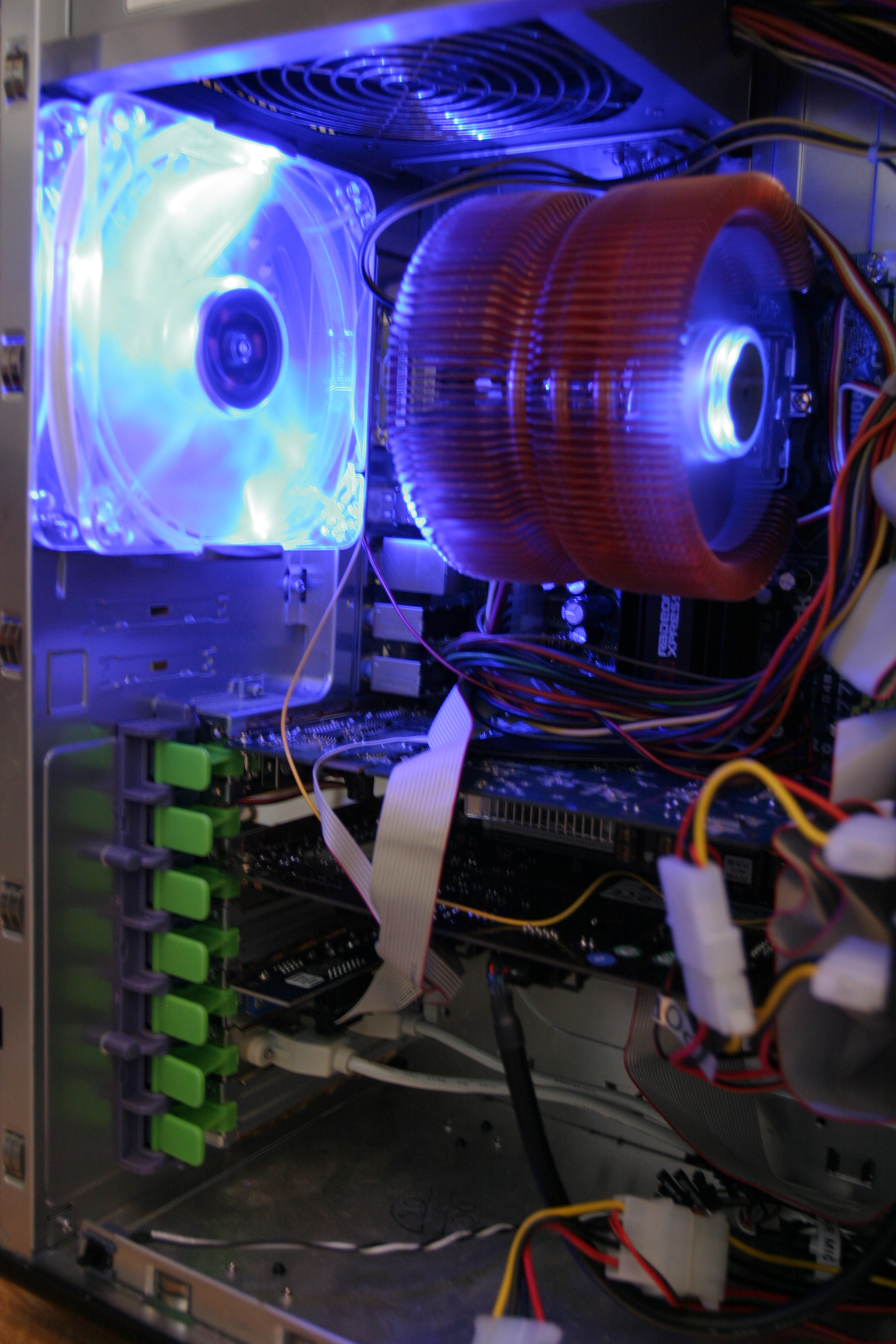
A computer with an LED fan

==== Window mods ====
This refers to a window placed within one of the panels of a computer case. This is most often done to the left hand side panel, and less often to the top panel. This modification is so popular that many of the major case manufacturers now offer cases with the windows pre-installed, or replaceable side panels with a window installed. Some companies even offer entire cases made out of transparent materials. A window kit may be modified to hold an LCD screen. Laser engraving can be done on acrylic windows to add a distinct look to a modded case.

A computer modded with different colored CCFLs and LED fans

==== Lighting mods ====
A lighting mod adds lighting in or on the computer case. This is usually achieved with cold cathode lights (CCLs), LED case fans, or electroluminescent wire lights. The lights are sometimes paired with sound controllers that make the lights pulse in time to sound. CCLs come in long tubes and produce heat. LEDs come in many sizes and forms, most often seen in bars similar to CCLs or within fans. Electroluminescent wire, which takes the form of a small light rope, is sometimes embedded in cables such as SATA cables. Lighting modifications are usually paired with window mods to help show off the components. As well, case fans, CPU heatsink fans, and power supplies themselves may feature lighting, thus enabling plug-and-play.

Computer hardware companies offer many components with built-in RGB LED lighting, offering dynamic control of the color of each light. RGB lighting may be integrated onto fans, liquid cooler pumps, RAM modules, or graphic card coolers, or they may be installed in the case itself as an RGB light strip. RGB lights may be controlled by the motherboard with an onboard lighting controller, or externally with a separate controller. They may also draw power directly from the power supply. Many cases now (as of 2019) come with side windows and RGB fans.

==== Paint mods ====
Painting a case is another method that case modders use to distinguish their system from others. Spray paint is the most common method preferred among amateur modders. There are many spray painting guides for amateur modders. This finish cannot be compared to automotive paint or powder coating, but it is a simple way to change the look of a case. Re-coloring the plastics of a case, keyboard, mouse and speakers with vinyl dye is another method that case modders use to highlight their own system, making them different from the rest. Vinyl dye has the advantages of ease of use like spray paint, but it is much more durable as it does not chip or scratch off. It also does not create a ‘layer’ like spray paint or similar.

==== Cable management ====
Routing cables, most often in computer cases, to be aesthetically pleasing is also a common practice in case modding. Similarly, covering the cables in a fabric, known as cable sleeving can also be undertaken to provide a more uniform look to the theme of the case.

==== Laptop modding ====
Laptops can be modified much like a typical computer case. While most laptop mods consist of new paint or other finishes, others have chosen to engrave or cut out designs into their laptop cover (usually behind the screen). Laptops may also be turned into digital photo frames. These types of mods will typically void the warranty of the device, as this requires opening up the computer to do them. To avoid warranty issues, skins or stickers can be purchased, which are easily removable from the casing.

=== Function ===
==== Cooling mods ====
Numerous modifications fall into this category, the simplest one being drilling a mount for a new fan, or removing a restrictive fan grill. Others include air ducts, water cooling, filtering, sealing openings to make airflow over hot components instead of escaping near where it entered, or even the adding of a tank of pressurized carbon dioxide or liters of mineral oil to the case. These modifications are often performed by overclockers looking either for better cooling for particularly hot components and/or noise (sound) reduction. Some fan modifications are merely a show of technical modding skill or talent and have no functional purpose. Hardcore overclockers often install cooling systems for the sole purpose of achieving performance records. Such systems may include water cooling, phase change materials, thermoelectric/Peltiercoolers, and even liquid nitrogen.

== Less common modifications ==
=== Automotive paint & other finishes ===
Automotive paint refers to the paint typically seen on cars and trucks. This type of finish requires a compressed air source, such as an air compressor or CO_{2} tank, and a spray gun. It is more expensive than a finish using spray cans, but when done skillfully it can be better looking and much more durable. Other methods of painting can include powder coating which is highly durable though not quite as aesthetically pleasing to many modders as automotive paint. Electroplating can also be done on steel computer cases and parts. Aluminum cases can be plated or anodized as well, and processes are available to plate plastic cases. Plated coatings can range from a nickel to chrome and even gold. More elaborate finishes can be crafted by using a combination of techniques, such as chrome plating with a transparent color coat.

=== Body filler ===
Body filler (or Bondo) is a two-part putty often used to fix dents in automobiles. Case modders use it to fill and sculpt their own creations. When mixed with a paste catalyst the filler hardens in a short period of time and can be sanded, ground or cut to a desired shape. An alternative system uses fiberglass resin (catalyzed with liquid hardener) and either fiberglass cloth or mat to fill holes and form shapes. Lacquer based Spot Putty is often used to fill smaller imperfections before the application of primer. Typically, a case modder uses a combination of these materials to obtain the desired result. This method is usually used on the front plastic bezel of a computer case to give it a new look.

== Contests ==
Many websites and companies feature contests for case modders, awarding prizes and accolades to the winners. Examples include bit-tech's Mod of the Month and Mod of the Year competitions, while some of these contests are sponsored by computer enthusiast magazines, such as CPU magazine or Custom PC Magazine, both of which have monthly modding contests. Other contests are sometimes supported by computer parts manufacturers.

== Console case modding ==
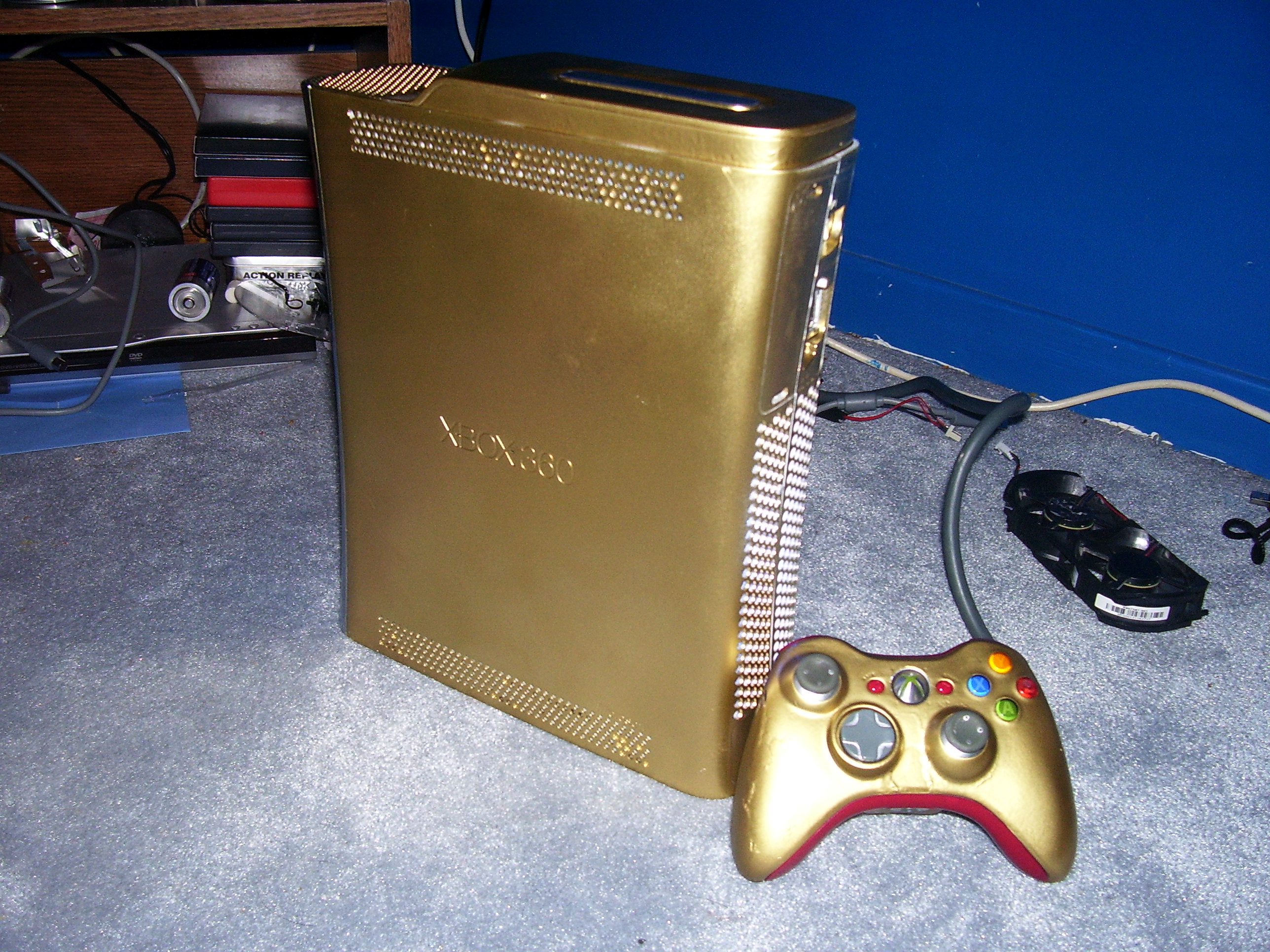
An example of an Xbox 360 case mod

Console case modding refers to the modification of the case of a game console. The most common consoles to modify are the Xbox and Xbox 360, because there is much more room inside to customize them with items such as lights and fans. Moreover, the Xbox 360 requires additional cooling over the factory configuration to avoid overheating issues due to the use of the wrong type of lead-free solder, which was not capable of handling the temperature limits standard solder can. These consoles and their controllers are also relatively easy to take apart. For those who do not wish to scratch-build mods, there are several companies that sell transparent Xbox cases and various cooling/lighting equipment for them.

Console case modding started in the late 1980s when the NES and Sega Genesis, were released; many customers simply put pictures or stickers on them until the PlayStation was released. Many case modders started to change hardware, for example by altering them to play copied games (known as 'chipping' the games console). The most common modification for the PlayStation was the 'chipping' process (mentioned above). When the Nintendo 64, Dreamcast and PlayStation 2 were released, many chipped them, styled them, and added additional cooling; some went as far as changing the hardware itself. When the Xbox and Xbox 360 were released, many modders personally customized them further, using neon lights, transparent cases, fans, and PC hard drives (as opposed to Xbox-branded drives). Many modders found that altering the interior of Xbox 360s was difficult due to absence of a power cable (normally in a PC, this cord attaches the hard disk drive to its motherboard). Despite shortcomings, modders also found a way to power neon lighting and other powered equipment by using the DVD-ROM power supply; however, due to insufficient power to the hard disk drive, it often caused freezing during disk access. Another common method for internal case modding uses the power outlet for the internal fan by splitting the cord with a "Y" connector. However, the most up to date modders will use power points under where the PSU (power supply) plugs in, which doesn't diminish any (or very little) power from the console.

== See also ==
- Modchip
- Modding
- Overclocking
- USB decoration
