= Instituto Universitario de Restauración del Patrimonio of the Universitat Politècnica de València =

Instituto Universitario de Restauración del Patrimonio
Foundation	1999
Location	Valencia
Host	Polytechnic University of Valencia
Director	MªTeresa Doménech Carbó
Phone	34 963877835
Website	www.upv.es/irp

The Instituto Universitario de Restauración del Patrimonio (the IRP) of the Polytechnic University of Valencia is a public Spanish institution dedicated to promoting heritage conservation research and practice.

== History ==
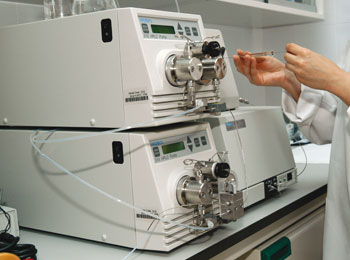
Ion-exchange chromatography. Scientific analysis equipment of high sensitivity for the identification and quantification of organic substances.

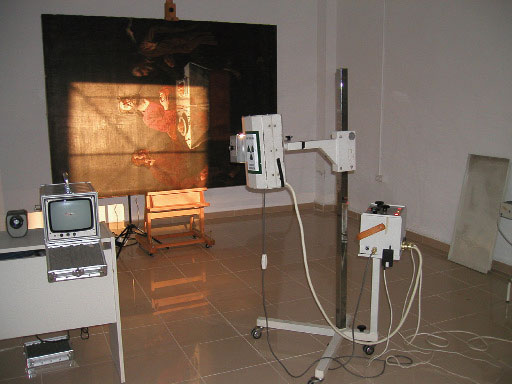
X-Ray examination. Nondestructive technique used to view and examine the internal structure of objects.

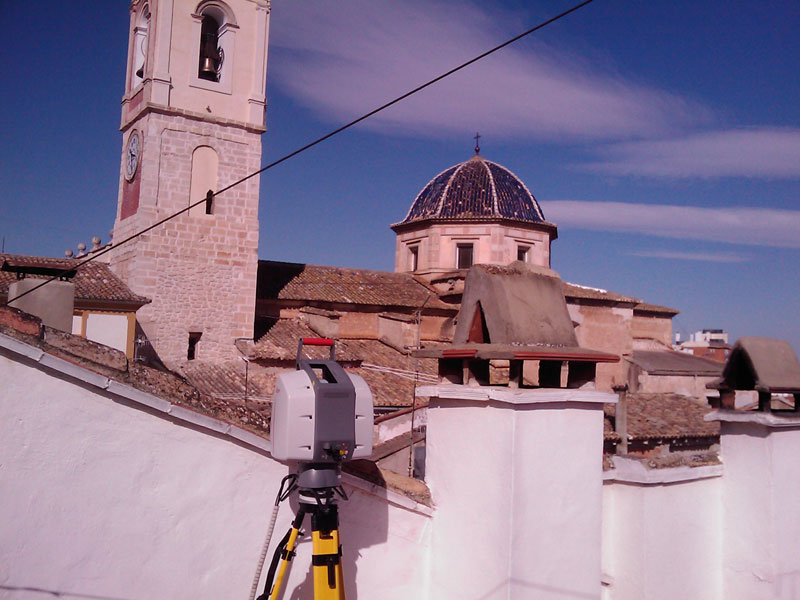
High performance 3D scanner

The IRP was created in 2000 as ENCI (Estructura No Convencional de Investigación – Unconventional Research Structure) according to the UPV government committee of 21 December 1999.

Later, according to the Spanish Order 6/2006, of 13 January, of the local government (Generalitat Valenciana) (DOGV-núm. 5179 of 18 January 2006), the IRP was appointed as Research University Institute of the Universitat Politècnica de València.

== Services ==
The Instituto Universitario de Restauración del Patrimonio is divided into two areas: the area of intervention in the Pictorial and Sculptural Heritage and the area of intervention in the Architectural Heritage, and a Training and Dissemination area.

The area of intervention in the pictorial and sculptural heritage operates in both basic research and applied research in seeking to acquire new knowledge to develop new products, techniques, processes, methods and systems that improve existing ones. The area of intervention in the Pictorial and Sculptural Heritage consist in restoration workshops:

- Mural Painting: cool, dry, glue, tempera, sgraffito
- Easel Painting and Altars: canvas, board, altarpiece
- Sculptural and Ornamental Materials: stone, mortar, stucco, bronze, terracotta, wood
- Golden, polychrome, furniture and expertizing
- Archaeological and ethnographic materials: flooring, tiles, ceramic tiles, glass, archaeological remains, tapestry, vestment, robes
- Graphic and Documentary: drawing, scroll, prints, book, photograph, manuscript

The intervention Area of Architectural Heritage comprises:

- Monumental and Historic Architecture
- Landscape and rural heritage
- Research, Restoration of Architectural Heritage and Outreach
- Urban Analysis
- Engineering applied to Heritage
- Color Research on Heritage
- Documentation, Critical Analysis and Promotion of Heritage
- Museum
