= Rosa Visiedo Claverol =

Chancellor of CEU Cardinal Herrera University

Rosa Visiedo Claverol was the Chancellor of CEU Cardinal Herrera University. She took up the post on October 14, 2011.

== Education ==
Visiedo Claverol received her Bachelor's degree in Information Sciences (journalism) at the Polytechnic University of Valencia, and her doctorate of Information Sciences(Marketing) at the Complutense University of Madrid.

She has held various positions at CEU Cardinal Herrera University, including Secretary General, Vice Chancellor for Students and Quality, Vice Chancellor of Communication, Quality and European Convergence, Dean of the Faculty of Social Sciences and Law.
