= Hexus =

Technology review website

HEXUS.net
- Website type: online magazine
- Owner: The Media Team Ltd
- Creator: David Ross
- Website: www.hexus.net
- Commercial: Yes
- Registration: No
- Launched: 24 July 2000; 26 years ago
- Current status: online

HEXUS is a UK-based technology reporting and reviews website founded by David Ross in 2000 and owned by The Media Team. The site later became an incorporated entity in 2005.

== History ==
The HEXUS domain name was registered on 14 July 2000.

Longstanding features of the site include Hexus.gaming and Hexus.lifestyle. The content published on Hexus.net includes news, reviews, guides, interviews and industry tradeshow coverage. In August 2006, Hexus.tv (a video section) was added to the site, streaming interviews as well as trailers for upcoming hardware and games. In January 2008, Hexus.channel was created, providing readers with more business orientated news, such as stocks/shares analysis. In February 2011, Hexus launched a spin-off site www.mobile-device.biz dedicated to news and reports for the mobile industry. In October 2011, Hexus launched a redesigned front-end, combining the Hexus.gaming, Hexus.lifestyle, Hexus.trust, Hexus.tv, Hexus.channel and www.mobile-device.biz websites into the single www.HEXUS.net domain. Hexus also launched a new mobile site.

The site is now split into categories for Tech, Gaming, Business, Consumer, Mobile, Hexus.tv and Trust along with a user forum section.

Quote from HEXUS founder David Ross: "I set up HEXUS when I was 16 – I was studying at Aylesbury Grammar School – it was originally a Gaming Blog – and I then branched in to Hardware very quickly. I wanted to have a site to have content on it and talk about tech/gaming etc. HEXUS has been around 11 years now. HEXUS launched HEXUS.tv in August 2006 we have pioneered technology coverage. Our base is in Elstree, Borehamwood. Traffic has doubled year on year."

HEXUS moved to a custom built facility in October 2013 in St Albans.

On 1 November 2021, Hexus published a story detailing that the website would no longer be updated, but the forums would remain active.

== HEXUS.trust ==
To help users make more informed decisions about purchasing computer equipment online, Hexus.trust employs a 5 star rating system for retailers. Registered users can rate and discuss their experience with companies, the details of which are stored for anyone to view.

== care@HEXUS ==
Through the care@HEXUS forum section, Hexus enable a single source for after-sales support from various manufacturers and suppliers.

== See also ==
- Bit-Tech
