= Harry Heaney =

British chemist

Harry Heaney (3 September 1931 – 25 October 2025) was an emeritus professor of organic chemistry at Loughborough University. His research centred on heterocyclic compounds containing nitrogen.

== See also ==
- Harry Kroto
