= CPC theory =

Currents' Physical Components (CPC) Theory is an advanced power theory in electrical engineering that provides a comprehensive framework for analyzing and compensating electrical systems with non-sinusoidal voltages and currents. Developed by Professor Leszek S. Czarnecki CPC theory addresses the limitations of traditional power theories in handling modern electrical systems characterized by harmonic distortion and unbalanced loads.

== Background ==
Investigations on power properties of circuits with nonsinusoidal voltages and currents were initiated by Ch.P. Steinmetz in 1892 and were continued for more than a century. The main contributions to these studies were made by C.I. Budeanu (1927), S. Fryze (1931), W. Shepherd and P. Zakikhani (1972), N.L. Kusters and W.J.M. Moore (1980), A. Nabae and H. Akagi (1983), M. Depenbrock (1993), and P. Tenti (2003), and thousands of their followers. Description of energy transfer in power terms, identification of causes of the decline of this transfer effectiveness, and the development of methods of improvement of these effectiveness by compensators were the main objectives of studies on power properties of electrical circuits.

== Development ==
The development of CPC-based power theory by Leszek S. Czarnecki was initiated in 1983 when he challenged the correctness of existing power theories as applied to single-phase linear, time-invariant (LTI) loads with nonsinusoidal voltage, and next, he revealed the existence of a scattered current, and invented a method of reactance compensation. These results were extended to single-phase circuits with nonlinear loads and loads with periodically varying parameters, referred together to as harmonics-generating loads (HGL). The existence of a load-generated current that transfers energy from the load back to the supply source was revealed in such circuits. The development of power theory and methods of compensation in single-phase circuits has created a ground for the development of such a theory of three-phase circuits both with sinusoidal, nonsinusoidal, and asymmetrical supply voltage. The existence of an unbalanced current was revealed in such circuits in the presence of the load imbalance, and a method of load balancing through reactance balancing compensators was developed. These results of CPC apply to circuits with LTI loads and HGLs. After that, the CPC was also extended to three-phase circuits with a neutral conductor and to compensation in such circuits.

== Key concepts ==
Decomposition of the load current into mutually orthogonal components associated with distinctive, energy transfer-related phenomena, is the key concept behind the Currents’ Physical Components (CPC) - based power theory. There are five such current components:

- Active current. It is associated with the phenomenon of permanent energy transfer to the load.
- Scattered current. It is associated with the phenomenon of the load conductance change with harmonic order.
- Reactive current. It is associated with the phenomenon of the mutual phase shift of the current and voltage harmonics.
- Load-generated current. It is associated with the phenomenon of reversed energy transfer, meaning from the load to the supply source.
- Unbalanced current. It is associated with the phenomenon of the current asymmetry caused by the load imbalance.

== Applications ==
CPC-theory provides fundamentals for the design of compensators that can:

- elevate the effectiveness of electric energy transfer
- reduce distortion of voltages and currents
- reduce the voltage and current asymmetry
- improve the loading quality (LQ) of modern power electronics driven loads.

It provides fundamentals for the design and control of:

- reactance compensators of reactive and unbalanced currents,
- adaptive balancing compensators,
- switching compensators,
- hybrid compensators

CPC theory also creates fundamentals for power measurements and optimization-oriented control in commercial and industry power distribution systems.
