= Polimedia =

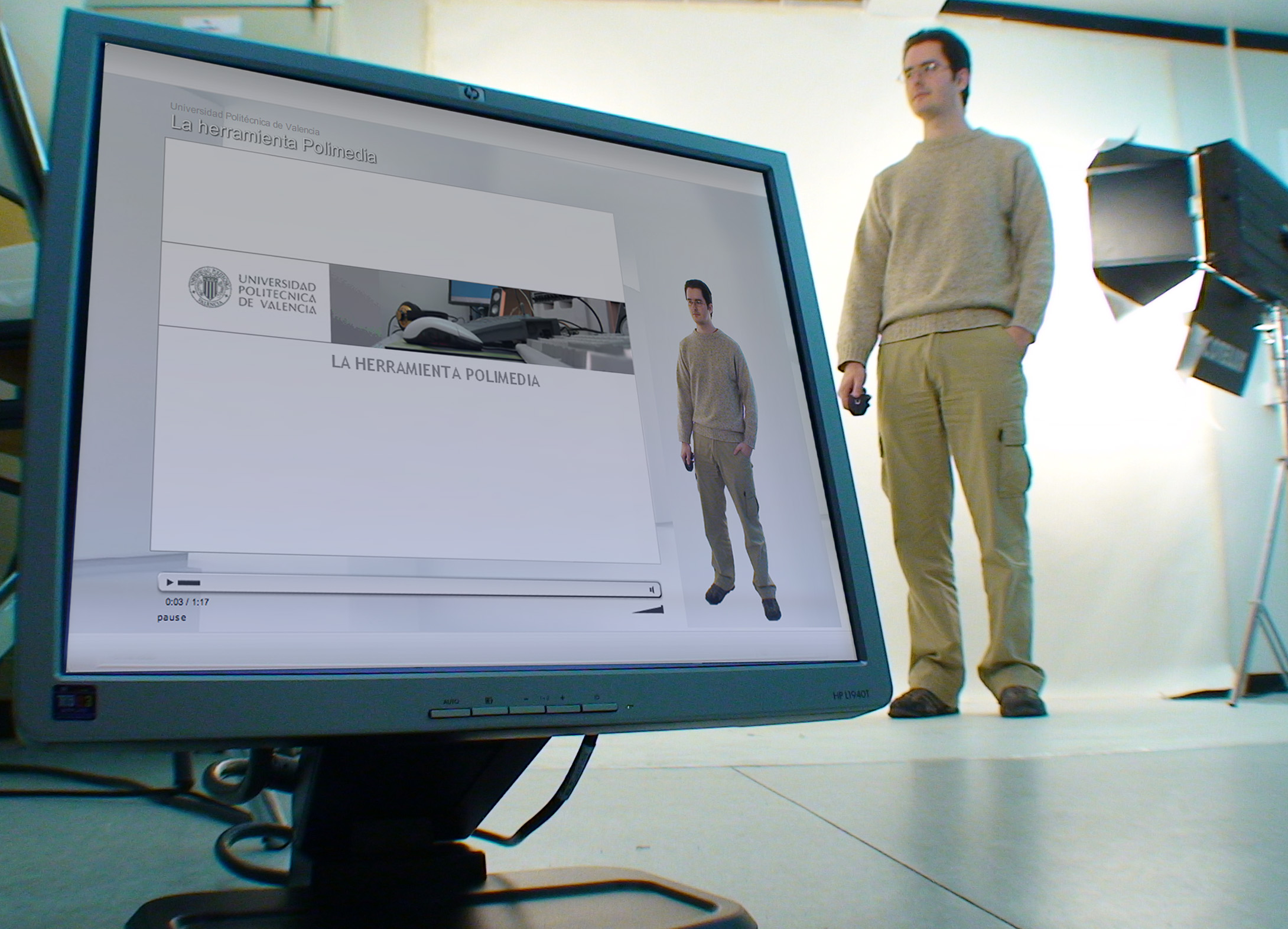
Polimedia recording

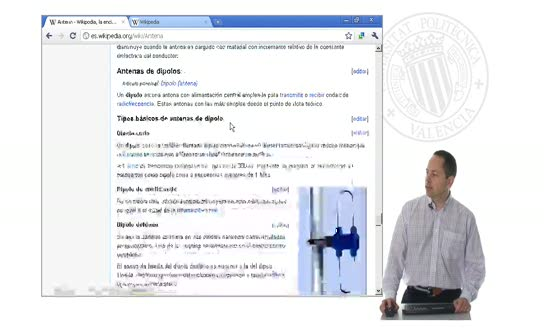
Polimedia Course

Polimedia is a system designed at the Universitat Politècnica de València for the creation of high resolution multimedia educational content in a cheap and easy way.

The specification consists of a mini-recording studio with a video camera, a computer for the author, and a computer for the capture and encoding process that produces an mp4 video with the author's video and the digital content presented in the computer. The screenshot of the teacher's computer can be replaced by an overhead camera image or the output of an interactive screen if required.

The system is controlled by a technician (which requires minimal training) and creates videos without the need of postproduction, so the video is available almost in real time (with the only delay of the encoding time). The videos are stored on a local server system managed by a simple database and, in the latest versions, can be exported to YouTube and iTunesU.

The system has been running since 2003 at the UPV, where they have recorded over 16,500 videos, and has been implemented for the production of educational content in several Spanish universities such as Universitat Autònoma de Barcelona (UAB), the Polytechnic University of Cartagena,(UPTC) and the University of La Laguna (ULL). It has also been implemented in various organizations and universities around the world, including the University of São Paulo and the University of Honduras Global UNITEC.

The system was awarded one of the International Forum of Digital Content (FICOD) prizes in 2009 for the use of digital content to improve citizen services.
