= College Preparatory Center =

School in Saudi Arabia

Saudi Aramco's College Preparatory Center (CPC) is where the College Preparatory Program (CPP) is held. It is a pre-requisite to enter the College Degree Program for Non Employees (CDPNE), a highly selective program established in 1985 by the Saudi Arabian Oil Company, Saudi Aramco. The CPP is a 10-months program of study at the CPC (near Industrial Training Center in Dhahran) for boys and STC (Special Training Center) which is located inside the seniors' campus, for girls. After those ten months, students move on to universities abroad either to the US, UK, Canada, China, Korea, Japan, or Australia and New Zealand to finish their 4-year bachelor's degree education under the CDPNE program.

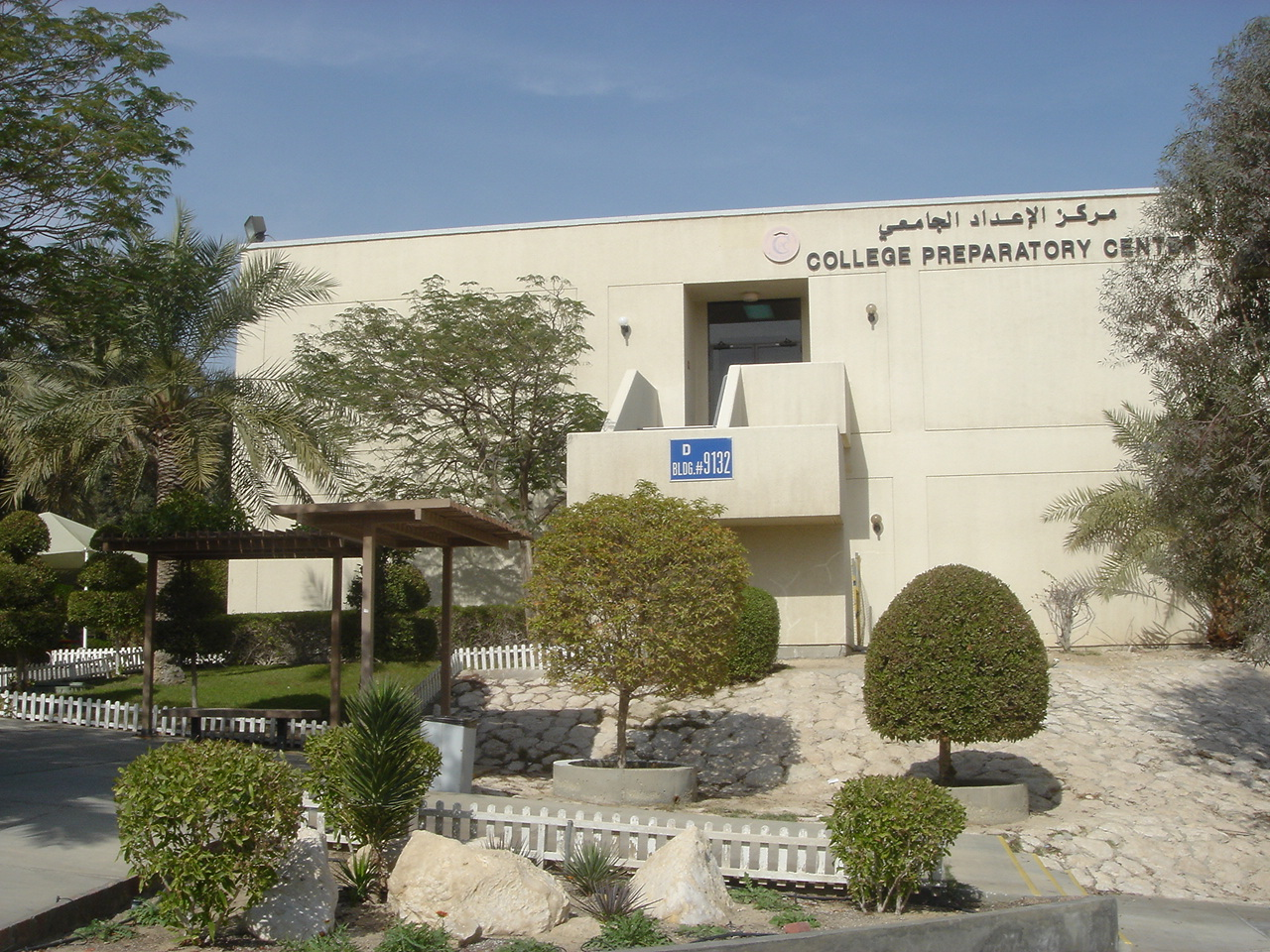
CPC Campus - Building D

== History ==
The program was exclusive for Saudi male students until Saudi Aramco announced it will give scholarships to female students during Summer-2006. For the Academic Year 2006–2007 251 males and 56 females were accepted in the program. For the Academic Year 2009-2010, 182 males and 43 females were accepted in the program. In 2003–2004, the admission rate was 1.20%, 148 admitted from a pool of 12,300 qualified applicants. Each student is assigned to a Saudi Aramco department related to his concentration of study. In 2013-2014, the admission rate was 2.2%, 350 boys and 82 girls admitted from a pool of more than 20,000 students all over the kingdom of Saudi Arabia.

== Program ==
During the year, students are divided into four tracks according to their Math and English placement test:

1. D: High level in both Math and English.
2. C: Regular Math and C in English.
3. B: Regular or High-level Math and B in English.
4. A: Regular or High-level Math and A in English.

The year in CPP is divided into three trimesters in which students take different subjects according to their level and major. All students take ESL courses, research courses, computer & internet skills courses, and library skills courses. All the students also take AP preparation courses which are of great importance to the administration and faculty. All students except business students take AP Calculus AB, or AP Calculus BC. Some students take AP Computer Science, AP Chemistry, AP Physics B, AP Physics C, AP Statistics, AP Macroeconomics, AP Microeconomics. During the year, C level students are offered to take two SAT tests, and one test for students in level B or A. All students are offered to take up to 3 IELTS tests if they didn't achieve the required record in the first time. In some cases, an early departure is allowed for selective students to study in Far East countries such as China, Korea, Japan, and Australia. Which started in 1998, however, this program stopped in 2015. The CPP is divided into three units. The units are subdivided into departments as follows:

- Chemistry & Geology Department (Chairman: Mr. Raymond Garcia),
- Computer Science Department (Chairman: Anonymous),
- General Studies & English Department (Chairman: Mr. Ron Mortensen),
- Physics Department (Chairman: Mr. Ihab K. Ashkar),
- Mathematics Department (Chairman: Mr. Dennis Luy),
- Business Studies Department. (Chairman: Ms. Ria Madlangsakay),
- Personal Fitness & Sports (PE) Department. (Chairman: Mr. Musa Abdul-Aziz),

Most of the staff who work in the CPP are from English speaking countries, and they are qualified. The style of education instruction mimics most American universities (schools) in the United States.

The requirements for applying CPC are as follows:

1. Be a recent high school graduate
2. a grade of 90 or higher in Qiyas assessment test must be scored in order for a student to be admitted to the program. But put in your mind to get a +95 score.
3. a school GPA of at least 90% (3.60 / 4 ) must be scored in English, Maths, Computer, Physics, Biology, and Chemistry.
4. All students must submit a Tahsili score regardless of how good it is. If you score lower than 90% in High school, you should have a grade of 80 or higher in the Tahsili test.
5. Passing Math and English placement test

The graduation requirements from CPC are as follows:

1. an IELTS score of 6.5 or higher with each section no lower than 5.5 for CH and CR students, an IELTS score of 6.0 or higher with each section no lower than 5.5 for BR students, or an IELTS score of 5.5 or higher with each section no lower than 5 for AR students.
2. a CGPA (Cumulative grade point average) of 2.5/4 or higher.
3. a GPA of 2.5/4 or higher in the third trimester.
4. To get at least D in the Research Paper Writing English course (ENGL036)

The benefits for all students :

1. During those 10 months the company offers the students a free dorm room. The boys' dorm is located in Al-Munirah Camp, while the girls' dorm is located inside the seniors' camp.
2. A monthly salary of 4000 SR.
3. Free bus transportation from CPC, STC to the dorms.
4. Students can book free airline tickets to Jeddah or Riyadh and even Yanbu through Aramco's airline.

The benefits for girls:

1. The girls' dorm has 3 floors and about 36 rooms, on each floor there's a lounge room which has a microwave and a TV and computers. There is a washing room filled with clothes' washing machine, an advisor to help the girls, and to make sure that the place is secured. There's a spacious garden with a study room and a playroom.
2. living inside the camp for girls, which is a secure place and there are a lot of facilities and activities to do such as The Dhahran Recreation library, Al-Najjar Café, Tandoori House restaurant, Boling, Cinema, Duckpond playground, Dhahran Dining Hall, and a supermarket.
3. Free buses transportation to and from Dhahran Mall, Al-Rashid Mall at 3 different times a day.

All students who pass their first year in CPP are transferred to the CDPNE ( college degree program for nonemployee) and granted a full scholarship to one of the top overseas universities, mostly in the United States, Canada, United Kingdom, Republic of Ireland, and Australia with all expenses covered. Each scholar is given the opportunity to continue graduate studies up to the PhD degree, while receiving a full-time salary after working at least 5 years in the company.

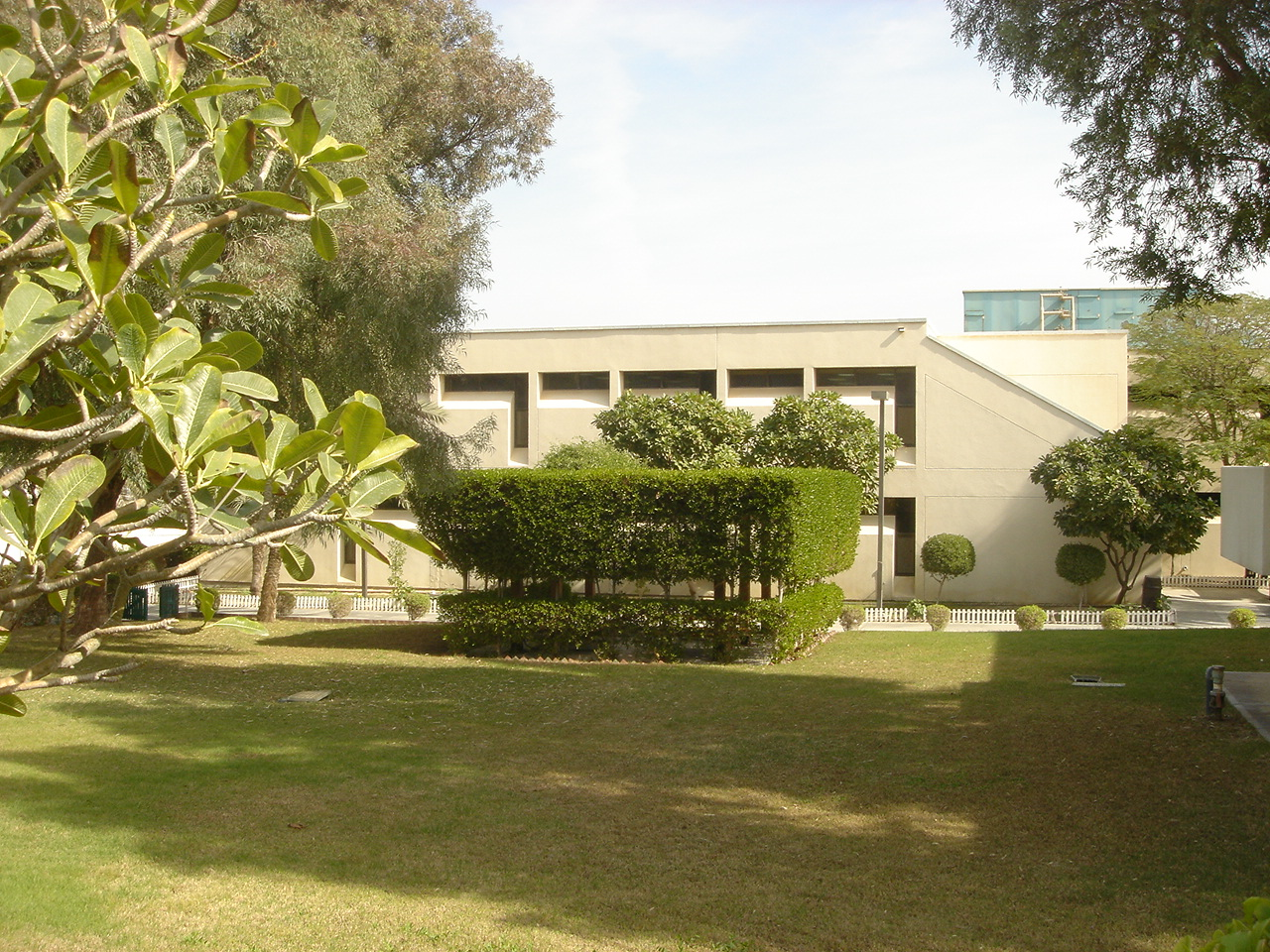
CPC Campus - Central lawn

Students are allocated degree paths upon acceptance. Most of these degrees relate to Engineering and Sciences, and it depends on the company need, it's not necessary they offer all of these majors every year. The males’ majors:

- Chemical Engineering
- Artificial Intelligence & Machine Learning
- Artificial Intelligence
- Visual Computing & Robotics
- Petroleum Engineering
- Computer Engineering
- Computer Science
- Microbiology
- Industrial Engineering
- Material Science & Engineering
- Mechanical Engineering
- Electrical Engineering
- Electronics Engineering
- Environmental Engineering
- Environmental Sciences
- Fire Protection Engineering
- Safety Engineering
- Software Engineering
- Systems Engineering
- Geology
- Geophysics
- Chemistry
- Industrial Chemistry
- Accounting
- Business Administration
- Criminal Justice
- Finance
- Human Resource Development
- Human Resource Management
- hospitality management
- Supply Chain Management
- Management Information Systems
- Marketing

The females’ majors:

- Computer Engineering
- Computer Science
- Chemical Engineering
- Supply Chain Management
- Petroleum Engineering
- Mechanical Engineering
- Electrical Engineering
- Software Engineering
- Geology
- Geophysics
- Chemistry
- Accounting
- Human Resource Development
- Human Resource Management
- hospitality management
- Management Information Systems
