= California Preparatory College =

California Preparatory College is a non-profite, non-denominational Christian community college founded in 2007 in Redlands, California, United States.

California Preparatory College is located at 245 E Redlands Blvd. San Bernardino CA 92408 Phone 909.264.3255.
