= Różanka =

Różanka may refer to the following places in Poland:

- Różanka, Lower Silesian Voivodeship (south-west Poland)
- Różanka, Lublin Voivodeship (east Poland)
- Różanka, Subcarpathian Voivodeship (south-east Poland)
- Różanka, Greater Poland Voivodeship (west-central Poland)
- Różanka Rose Garden, in Szczecin
