= President of the Corts Valencianes =

- President de les Corts Valencianes
- Flag of the Valencian Community

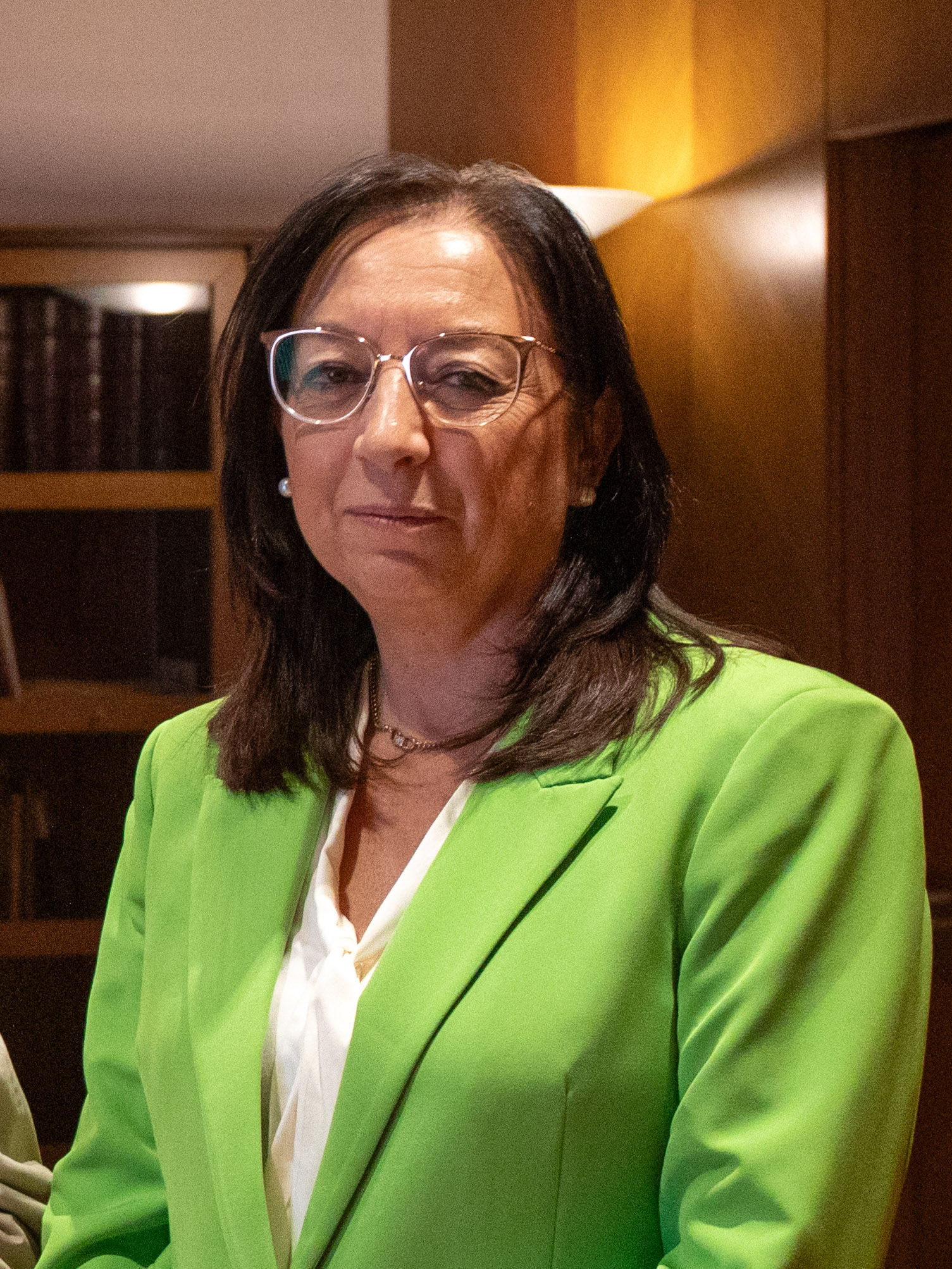
- Incumbent; Llanos Massó since 26 June 2023
- Member of: Corts Valencianes
- Formation: 7 June 1983
- First holder: Antonio García

The President of the Corts Valencianes, or Valencian Parliament, is the highest representative and leader of the Generalitat Valenciana, the regional legislature of the Valencian Community, an autonomous community of Spain. The President of the Corts presides over the chamber and the plenary sessions, among other functions.

Since 2023, the president of the Valencian Parliament has been Llanos Massó.

== Presidents ==
List of the presidents of the Corts Valencianes, the regional legislature of the Valencian Community.

^{No.}	Name	Portrait	Party	Took office	Left office	^{Legs.}	^{Refs.}
1	Antonio García		Socialist Party of the Valencian Country	7 June 1983	2 July 1987	1st	
1	Antonio García		Socialist Party of the Valencian Country	2 July 1987	18 June 1991	2nd	
1	Antonio García		Socialist Party of the Valencian Country	18 June 1991	20 June 1995	3rd	
2	Vicent González		Valencian Union	20 June 1995	24 February 1996	4th	
3	Hèctor Villalba		Valencian Union	12 February 1997	9 July 1999	4th	
4	Marcela Miró		People's Party of the Valencian Community	9 July 1999	12 June 2003	5th	
5	Julio de España		People's Party of the Valencian Community	12 June 2003	14 June 2007	6th	
6	María Milagrosa Martínez		People's Party of the Valencian Community	28 June 2007	9 June 2011	7th	
7	Juan Cotino		People's Party of the Valencian Community	9 June 2011	13 October 2014	8th	
8	Alejandro Font		People's Party of the Valencian Community	15 October 2014	11 June 2015	8th	
9	Francesc Colomer		Socialist Party of the Valencian Country	24 June 2015	2 July 2015	9th	
10	Enric Morera		Valencian Nationalist Bloc	3 July 2015	16 May 2019	9th	
10	Enric Morera		Valencian Nationalist Bloc	16 May 2019		10th	
