= Certificate of Professional Competence =

Certificate of Professional Competence (CPC) refers to two types of qualification in the UK transport and haulage industry:

- Driver CPC, for professional bus, coach and lorry drivers
- Transport Manager CPC, for transport managers
