= Cyanophosphaethyne =

Names
- Preferred IUPAC name Phosphanylidyneacetonitrile
- Other names 1,4-Azaphosphabutadiyne; C-Cyanophosphaethyne; Phosphinidyneacetonitrile; Cyanophosphapropyne

Identifiers
CAS Number	74896-22-3
3D model (JSmol)	Interactive image
ChemSpider	35786589
PubChem CID	12758601
CompTox Dashboard (EPA)	DTXSID30509137
- InChI: InChI=1S/C2NP/c3-1-2-4 Key: ZDTBSGXXDJXYMT-UHFFFAOYSA-N
- SMILES: C(#N)C#P

Properties
Chemical formula	C_{2}NP
Molar mass	69.003 g·mol^{−1}
- Except where otherwise noted, data are given for materials in their standard state (at 25 °C [77 °F], 100 kPa). Infobox references

Cyanophosphaethyne is an unstable molecular compound with structural formula N≡C–C≡P. It can be considered as cyanogen with one nitrogen atom replaced by phosphorus. It has been made as a dilute gas. Cyanophosphaethyne has been tentatively detected in the interstellar medium. Other structural isomers, such as C≡N–C≡P (isocyanophosphapropyne), C≡C-N≡P (azaphosphadicarbon), and N≡C–P=C (isocyanophosphavinylidene), have not been observed. The molecule has linear molecular geometry (C_{∞v} molecular symmetry).

== Production ==
Cyanophosphaethyne can be produced by heating cyanogen azide and phosphaethyne gases to 700 °C:

N≡C–N_{3} + H–C≡P → N≡C–C≡P + HN_{3}

Another method is to heat anhydrous methyl cyanide with anhydrous phosphorus trichloride:

N≡C–CH_{3} + PCl_{3} → N≡C–C≡P + 3HCl

== Properties ==
The dipole moment is 3.5 Debye. Having a large dipole makes the molecule easier to detect by certain types of spectroscopy than many other phosphorus containing molecules. The bond lengths are C≡N = 1.159 Å, C–C = 1.378 Å, and C≡P = 1.544 Å.
