= Instituto de Biomecánica de Valencia =

Spanish research institute

Instituto de Biomecánica de Valencia (IBV)
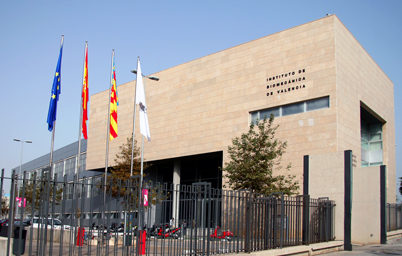
- IBV's building at the Polytechnic City of Innovation
- Founded: 1976, as a University Institute of Universidad Politécnica de Valencia
- Founder: Universidad Politécnica de Valencia and IMPIVA
- Type: National non-profit association
- Location(s): Ciudad Politécnica de la Innovación; Universidad Politécnica de Valencia. Building 9C; Camino de Vera s/n 46022 Valencia, Spain
- Members: 374 members (as of 12 December 2008), of which 253 are corporate associates, 114 collective and 7 are public administration associates.
- Website: www.ibv.org

The Instituto de Biomecanica de Valencia (IBV) is a Technology Center that studies the behavior of people in their relation to products, environments and services.
