= Custom PC =

UK-based computer magazine

- Cover of the final issue (April 2023, 235)
- Editor: Ben Hardwidge
- Categories: Computing
- Frequency: Monthly
- Circulation: 8,094 (Jan–Dec 2018)
- First issue: 2003
- Final issue Number: April 2023; 235
- Company: Raspberry Pi Trading Ltd
- Country: United Kingdom
- Website: www.custompc.com
- ISSN: 1740-7443

Custom PC (usually abbreviated to 'CPC') was a UK-based computer magazine originally published by Dennis Publishing Ltd and subsequently sold to Raspberry Pi Trading Ltd. It was aimed at PC hardware enthusiasts, covering topics such as modding, overclocking, and PC gaming. The first issue was released in October 2003 and it was published monthly until the final issue, number 235, was released in February 2023.

In February 2023 the magazine ceased printed production and the brand name and content rights were sold to Network N Media who relaunched the brand as an online-only entity CustomPC.com.

Audited circulation figures for the magazine were 9,428 (ABC, Jan–Dec 2014). Gareth Ogden retired as editor of Custom PC at the end of Issue 52. Issue 53 was edited by Deputy Editor James Gorbold; from Issue 54 onwards the magazine was edited by Alex Watson. From Issue 87 to Issue 102 the magazine was edited by James Gorbold. From Issue 103 onward, the magazine has been edited by Ben Hardwidge.

Between 2009 and January 2012, the magazine was partnered with enthusiast site bit-tech.net, with the two editorial teams merging and sharing resources across both the site and the magazine. Custom PC's James Gorbold took over as Group Editor of the two teams. However, since February 2012, the two brands have separated and content is no longer shared between the two publications, although many of the magazine's writers continue to write for bit-tech.

In February 2019 the magazine, along with Digital SLR Photography Magazine, was sold to Raspberry Pi Trading, a subsidiary of the Raspberry Pi Foundation.

Issue 235 in February 2023 became the final issue available in printed format. The brand was acquired by Network N in April 2023 with plans to continue coverage online. Custom PC persisted as an online publication until 2024, with existing editorial members then being migrated to PCGamesN's Hardware team.

As of 2026, CustomPC.com remains inactive, and the last remaining staff member, Edward Chester, is now the only current member of the PCGamesN hardware team.

== Sections ==
The magazine includes reviews, features, tutorials, analysis columns and sections devoted to magazine readers. The most current regular sections includes:

From the Editor
Introductory column by the editor Ben Hardwidge
Tracy King
Sceptical analysis of the ways in which technology and gaming are presented in the media
Richard Swinburne
Analysis of hardware trends in Taiwan
Hobby Tech
Tips, tricks and news about computer hobbyism, including Raspberry Pi, Arduino and retro computing, by Gareth Halfacree
Folding@Custom PC
Custom PC encourages readers to use their idle computers for the purpose of scientific research – Folding@home is a program created and run by Stanford University that uses spare processor cycles to simulate protein folding for disease research. Each month the magazine features a league table of their top folders, the 'Custom PC & bit-tech' team is currently ranked number 6 worldwide. One random folder receives an item of PC hardware each month (stopped in 2010), while the top folder that month is noted in the 'Folder of the month' section.
CPC Elite
A 10-page section of CPC's latest recommendations for the best hardware in several categories (motherboards, processors, cases etc.).
Reviews
CPC Magazine review the latest hardware and software (including games), they rate the product with their own rating system, and CPC give their stamp of approval (including a Premium Grade award for excellent products) to any product that they feel excels in its particular category. While hardware reviews are the focus of the magazine, games reviews are included.

Custom Kit
2 pages of short reviews of computer gadgets and accessories.
Lab Test
Each month CPC tests related hardware from different manufacturers / different specifications (such as graphics cards or hard-drives) comparing them to discern the best choice. The tests include extensive benchmark comparison tables. Unlike most computer magazines, CPC doesn't do price point labs tests. Instead each item is awarded a value score that reflects whether the item is worth the asking price.

Games
Reviews of the latest games plus graphical comparison guides that show the difference made by different graphical settings.
Inverse Look
Opinion and analysis of PC gaming, by Rick Lane
Features
Several in-depth articles on computer-related topics (normally 2 per issue)
Customised PC
Two-page column dedicated to modding, water-cooling and PC customisation, by Antony Leather
How To
5 pages of step-by-step tutorials written by Antony Leather.
Readers' Drives
Readers of the magazine get the chance to show off their computer modification skills. Each month a different reader is photographed with his rig and answers questions on its specification and how it was constructed. Featured modders win a prize pack of assorted computer hardware.
James Gorbold
The back page column is written by previous editor, James Gorbold, who now works for Scan Computers.

== Subscriber edition ==
Anyone who subscribes currently receives a free tool kit or another freebie such as a custompc mug or recently (28 January 2011) a Muc-off Screen Cleaning Rescue Kit, targeted at computer maintenance. Subscribers receive a Special Subscriber Edition which features exclusive artwork (usually the "flat-out coolest" photo from the cover shoot, according to Alex Watson).

== Editorial team ==
List of the editorial staff as of Issue 187 (April 2019).

- Publishing Director:- Russell Barnes
- Editor:- Ben Hardwidge
- Features Editor:- Edward Chester
- Modding Editor:- Antony Leather
- Games Editor:- Rick Lane
- Art Editor:- Bill Bagnall
- Production Editor:- Julie Birrell
- Regular Contributors:- Mike Jennings, James Gorbold, Gareth Halfacree, Phil Hartup, Tracy King, Richard Swinburne
- Photography:- Antony Leather, Gareth Halfacree, Henry Carter, Mike Jennings
- Regular Art & Production Contributors:- Magic Torch, Mike Harding

== Printing / distribution ==
- Printed by:- BGP.

Cover printed by:- Ancient House.

- Distributed by:- Seymour Distribution

== See also ==
- Maximum PC – American magazine with same focus
