= Computer Physics Communications =

- Discipline: Computational physics
- Language: English
- Edited by: Andrew Hazel

Publication details
- History: 1969–present
- Publisher: Elsevier
- Frequency: Monthly
- Impact factor: 7.2 (2023)

Standard abbreviations
- ISO 4: Comput. Phys. Commun.

Indexing
- ISSN: 0010-4655

Links
- Journal homepage

Computer Physics Communications is a peer-reviewed scientific journal published by Elsevier under the North-Holland imprint.

The journal focuses on computational methodology, numerical analysis and hardware and software development in support of physics and physical chemistry.

According to the Journal Citation Reports, the journal has a 2023 impact factor of 7.2.

== Computer Physics Communications Program Library ==
Associated with the journal is the CPC Program Library. This repository houses computer programs which have been described in the journal. Access to the library is bundled with journal subscriptions, although those unaffiliated with a subscribing institution can purchase individual subscriptions.

Originally hosted by the Queen's University Belfast, the service moved to 2016 in the Mendeley Data repository. It contains over 3,000 programs from 1969 and 2016.
