= Cycloparaphenylene =

Interactive 3D model of [5]cycloparaphenylene

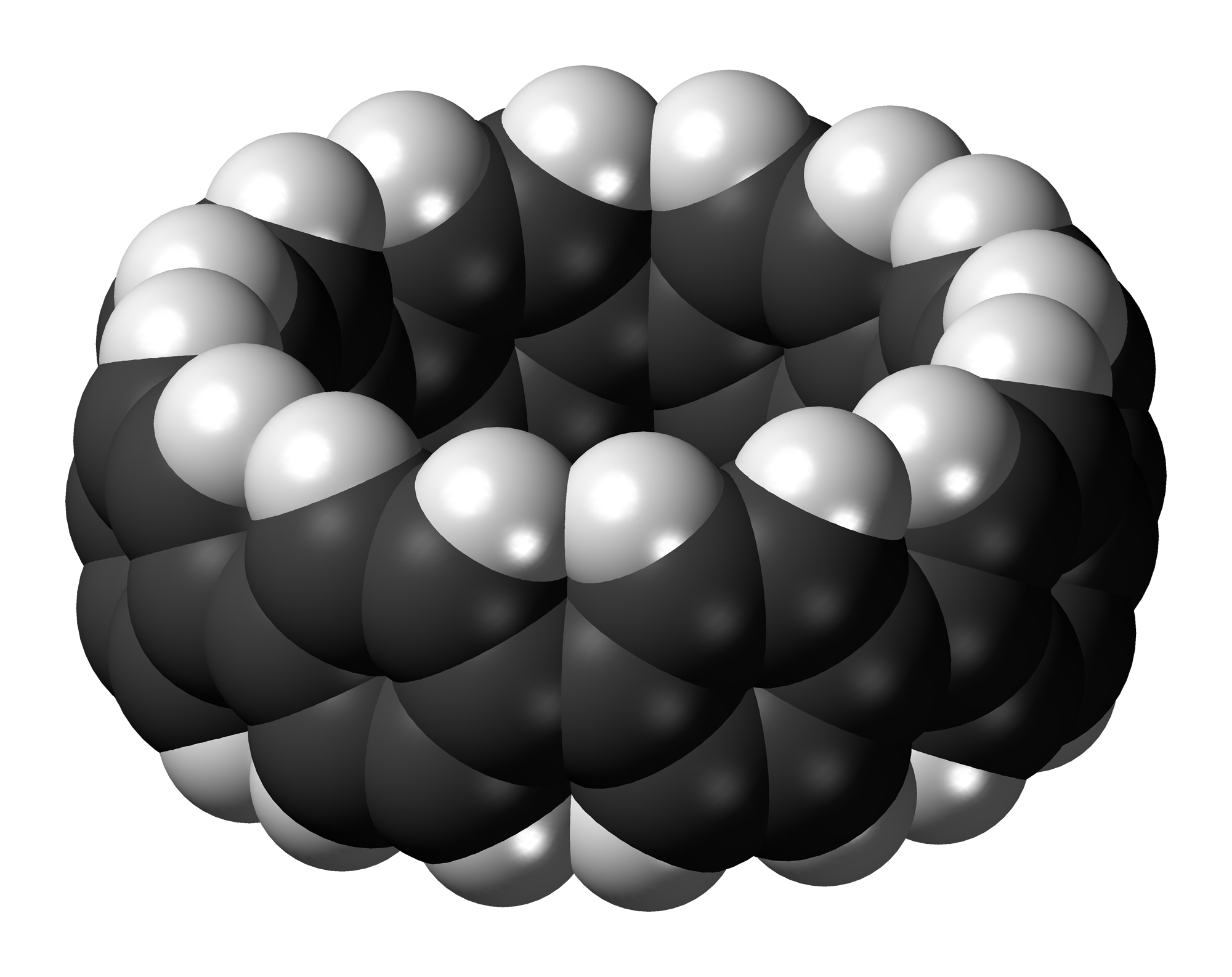
Space-filling model of an [8]cycloparaphenylene molecule.

A cycloparaphenylene is a molecule that consists of several benzene rings connected by covalent bonds in the para positions to form a hoop- or necklace-like structure. Its chemical formula is [C_{6}H_{4}]_{n} or C_{6n}H_{4n} Such a molecule is usually denoted [n]CPP where n is the number of benzene rings.

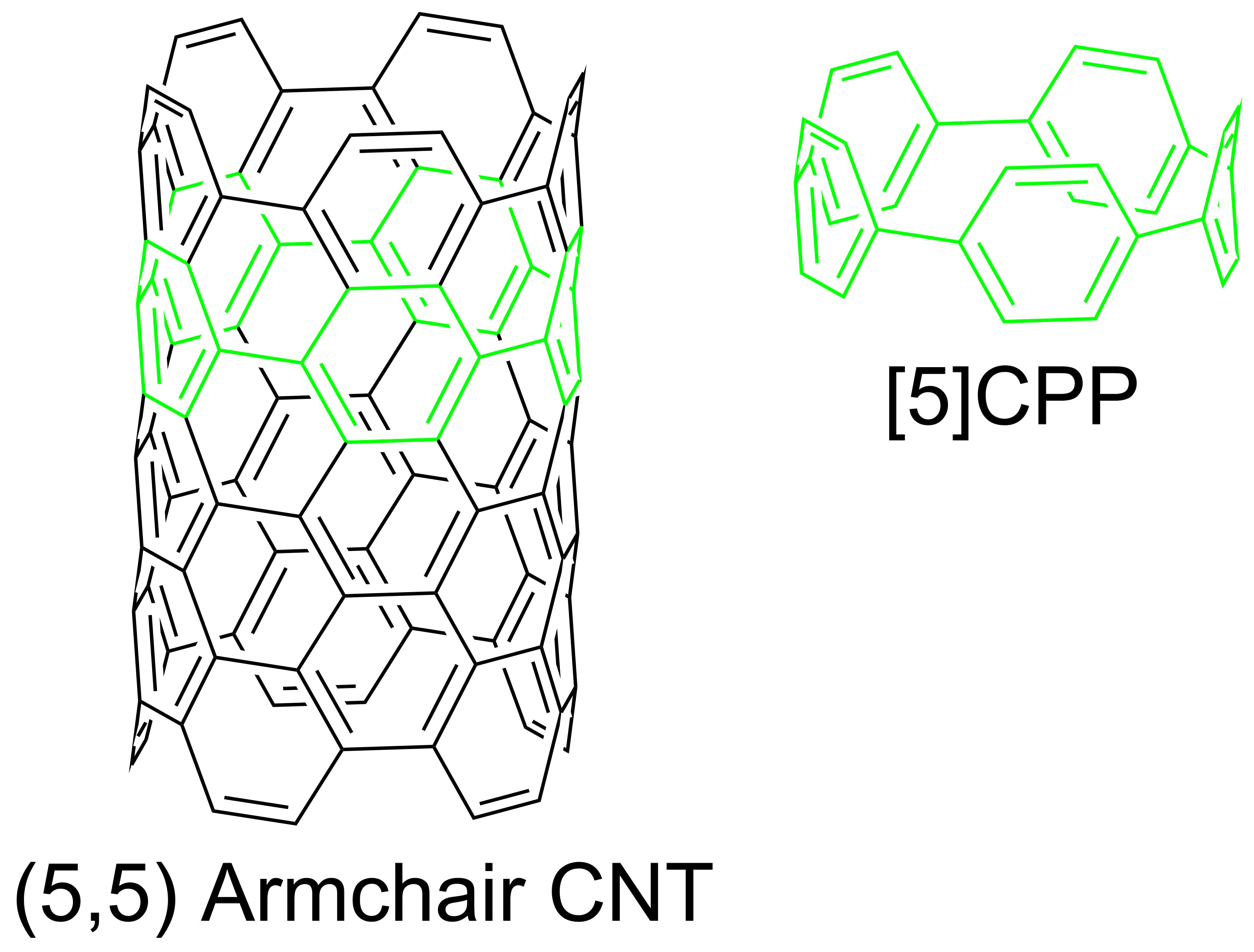
An "armchair" carbon nanotube and a cycloparaphenylene molecule.

A cycloparaphenylene can be considered as the smallest possible armchair carbon nanotube, and is a type of carbon nanohoop. Cycloparaphenylenes are challenging targets for chemical synthesis due to the ring strain incurred from forcing benzene rings out of planarity.

== History ==
In 1934 by V. C. Parekh and P. C. Guha described the first published attempt to synthesize a cycloparaphenylene, specifically [2]CPP. They connected two aromatic rings with a sulfide bridge, and hoped that removal of the latter would yield the desired compound. However, the attempt failed as the compound would have been far too strained to exist under anything but extreme conditions.

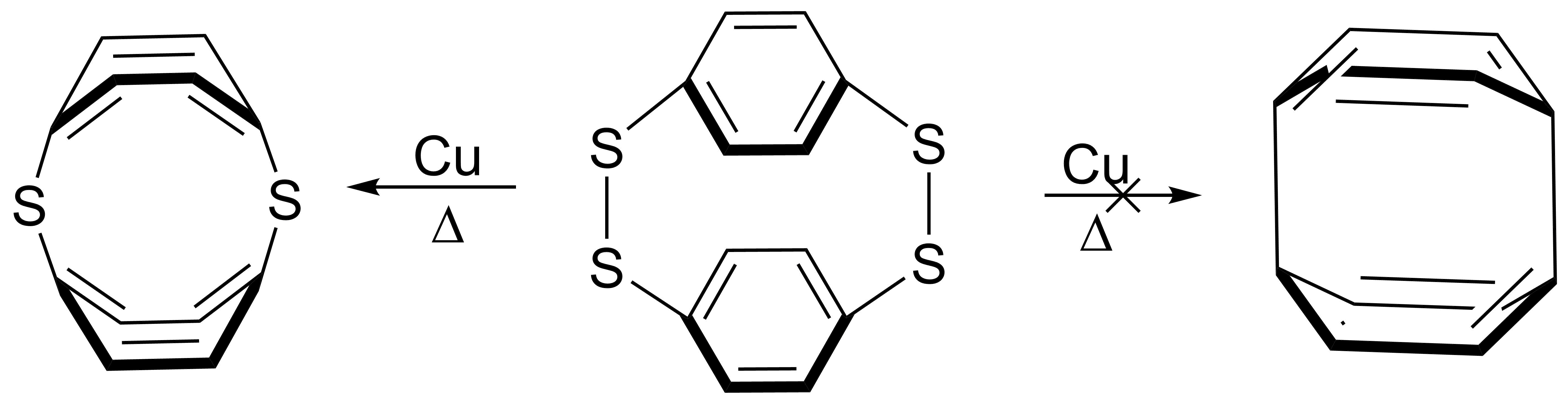
First attempts at a CPP

By 1993, Fritz Vögtle attempted to synthesize the less-strained [6]CPP and [8]CPP by the same approach. He produced a hoop of phenyl rings, bridged together by a sulfur atom. However, his attempts to remove the sulfur failed too. They also synthesized a macrocycle that upon dehydrogenation would yield a CPP, but could not perform this final step.

In the year 2000, Chandrasekhar and others concluded, by computational analysis, that [5]CPP and [6]CPP should be significantly different in their aromaticity. However, the synthesis in 2014 of [5]CPP refuted this conclusion.

In 2008 the first cycloparaphenylenes were synthesized by Ramesh Jasti during his post doctoral research in the lab of Carolyn Bertozzi. He used cyclohexa-1,4-dienes which are closer in oxidation state to the desired phenylene than the cyclohexanes used previously by Vögtle. The first cycloparaphenylenes that were reported and characterized were: [9]CPP, [12]CPP, and [18]CPP. In 2009, the Itami group would report the selective synthesis of [12]CPP, and shortly thereafter Yamago synthesized [8]CPP in 2010. The Jasti Group then synthesized all increasingly smaller CPPs using new methodology that allowed [7]CPP, [6]CPP, and finally [5]CPP to be reported in relatively quick succession.

== Properties ==
=== Structure ===
The normal configuration of each phenylene element would be planar, with the bonds in the para position pointing opposite to each other in a straight line. Therefore, the cycloparaphenylene molecule is strained, and the strain increases as the number of units decreases. The strain energy of [5]CPP was calculated as 117.2 kcal/mol. In spite of the strain, the phenyl rings retain their aromatic character, even in the [5]CPP. However, as the size of the CPP decreases the HOMO–LUMO gap also decreases. This trend opposite to that observed in linear polyparaphenylenes where the HOMO-LUMO gap decreases as size increases. This causes a red-shift of the fluorescent emission.

=== Solid-state packing ===
Cycloparaphenylenes with 7 to 12 rings all adopt a herringbone-like packing in the solid state. A similar but denser structure was observed for [5]CPP, whereas [6]CPP forms columns. This columnar packing structure has been of interest due to a potentially high internal surface area. By partial fluorination, it was found that this packing geometry could be engineered.

== Synthesis ==
There are three main methods used for cycloparaphenylene synthesis.

=== Suzuki Coupling of Curved Oligophenylene Precursors ===
In the initial synthesis, cycloparaphenylenes with n = 9, 12, and 18 have been synthesized starting from macrocycles containing 1,4-syn-dimethoxy-2,5-cyclohexadiene units as masked aromatic rings. Lithium–halogen exchange with p-diiodobenzene followed by a two-fold nucleophilic addition reaction with 1,4-benzoquinone yielded a syn-cyclohexadiene moiety. Borylation of this material followed macrocyclization under Suzuki–Miyuara cross-coupling with an equivalent of the diiodide produced macrocycles in low yields which could be separated by column chromatography. These macrocycles were then reductively aromatized using sodium naphthalenide to yield [n]cycloparaphenylenes. Since this initial synthesis uses symmetric building blocks it is challenging to use it to make smaller CPPs. Therefore, instead of benzoquinone, benzoquinone monomethyl ketal was used to allow the use of asymmetric building blocks. This innovation allowed the selective synthesis of [12]CPP to [5]CPP.

[5]CPP is synthesized with an intramolecular boronate homocoupling technique that was originally seen as an undesired by-product of Suzuki-Miyaura cross-coupling reactions in the synthesis of [10]CPP. Cycloparaphenylenes now have selective, modular, and high yielding synthetic pathways.

=== Reductive Elimination of Platinum Macrocycles ===
A quicker route to [8-13]CPPs starts by selectively building [8]CPP and [12]CPP from the reaction of 4,4′-bis(trimethylstannyl)biphenyl and 4,4′ ′-bis(trimethylstannyl)terphenyl, respectively, with Pt(cod)Cl2 (where cod is 1,5-cyclooctadiene) through square-shaped tetranuclear platinum intermediates. A mixture of [8-13]cycloparaphenylenes can be obtained in good combined yields by mixing biphenyl and terphenyl precursors with the platinum sources.

=== [2+2+2]Cycloaddition of Alkynes ===
A third method for the synthesis of cycloparaphenylenes developed in the Wegner group is based on rhodium-catalyzed [2+2+2]cycloadditions of substituted alkynes. The method has been further investigated by the Tanaka group, which have used the rhodium-catalysed cyclotrimerisation of alkynes as a core strategy.

== Potential applications ==
Potential applications of cycloparaphenylenes include host–guest chemistry, seeds for carbon nanotube growth, and hybrid nanostructures containing nanohoop-type substituents. A cycloparaphenylene can be seen as minimal single-walled carbon nanotube of the armchair type. As such, a cycloparaphenylene may be a seed for synthesis of longer nanotubes. Their electronic properties may also be useful.

=== Fullerene binding ===
Cycloparaphenylenes have shown affinity to fullerenes and other carbonaceous molecules, with interactions similar to those in carbon peapods. Potential applications of these structures include nanolasers, single electron transistors, spin-qubit arrays for quantum computing, nanopipettes, and data storage devices.

Specifically, the π-π interactions and the concave interior of the cycloparaphenylenes is expected to bind to π conjugated systems with convex surfaces that can fit inside the ring. Indeed, [10]CPP has been shown to selectively bind a C60 fullerene within its hole, thus producing a "molecular bearing". The fullerene remains in the ring long enough to be observed on the NMR timescale. The fluorescence of [10]CPP is quenched upon complexation with C60, which suggests its potential as a C60 sensor. In 2018 this affinity was exploited to create CPP-fullerene rotaxanes.

It has been observed that such "ball-in-hoop" interactions are stronger for endohedral metallofullerenes, in which a positively charged metal ion is trapped inside a fullerene cage and makes it more electronegative. Specifically, [12]CPP was found to preferentially enclose metallofullerenes instead of "empty" fullerenes, reducing their solubility in toluene; which provides a convenient separation method for the two species.

== Related compounds ==
As the synthesis of CPPs has become easier, derivative structures have begun to be synthesized as well. In 2013 the Itami group reported the synthesis of a nanocage made completely of benzene rings. This compound was especially interesting because it could be viewed as a junction of a branched nanotube structure.

Other chiral derivatives of cycloparaphenylenes (which may serve as chemical templates for synthesizing chiral nanotubes) have also been characterized. Similar to the original (n,n) cycloparaphenylenes, these chiral nanorings also exhibit unusual optoelectronic properties with excitation energies growing larger as a function of size; however, the (n+3,n+1) chiral nanoring exhibits larger photoinduced transitions compared to the original (n,n) cycloparaphenylenes, resulting in more readily observable optical properties in spectroscopic experiments.

In 2012 the Jasti Group reported the synthesis of dimers of [8]CPP linked by arene bridges. This synthesis was followed two years later by the synthesis of a directly connected dimer of [10]CPP from chloro[10]CPP by the Itami group.

=== Donor–acceptor functionalization ===
CPPs are unique in that their donor–acceptor properties can be adjusted with the addition or removal of each phenyl ring. In the all-carbon nano-hoop systems a reduction in width corresponds to a higher HOMO and a lower LUMO. Additional donor–acceptor selectivity was observed by the addition of an aromatic heterocycles into the larger ring. N-methylaza[n]CPP showed that a lowering of the LUMO could be enhanced by decreasing the ring size, while the HOMO energy level remained the same.

== See also ==
- Cyclacenes - hoops of fused aromatic rings
- Polyparaphenylene - linear polymer
- Triphenylene - a ring of three ortho-connected benzene rings
- Carbon nanohoop
