= Jasti =

Jasti (Telugu: జాస్తి) is a Telugu surname.

- Jasti Chelameswar (born 1953), the former Judge of Supreme Court of India
- Teja (born Jasti Dharma Teja, in 1966), an Indian cinematographer turned director
- Ramesh Jasti, a professor of organic chemistry
- Jasti Eswara Prasad, (1934–2021), an Indian judge
