= Carbon nanohoop =

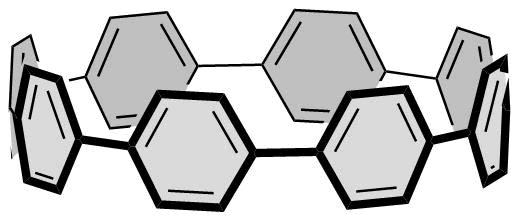
The first carbon nanohoop was entirely made of phenylenes. Newer examples contain other aromatic repeating units.

Carbon nanohoops are a class of molecules consisting of a conjugated carbon backbone that is curved out of planarity by the inherent cyclic geometry of the molecule which orients the p-orbitals radially. The most studied class of carbon nanohoops are cycloparaphenylenes (CPPs) which were first synthesized in 2008 by Ramesh Jasti and Carolyn Bertozzi. Cyclonaphthylenes, cyclochrysenylenes, and cyclohexabenzocoronenylenes have also been synthesized. There are examples of nanohoops containing antiaromatic units such as dibenzo[a,e]pentalene and pyrrolo[3,2-b]pyrrole. Some carbon nanohoops map on to a section of a carbon nanotube, including chiral sections. Carbon nanohoops can act as a supramolecular host for guests including fullerenes.

Crystal structures of [6]CPP, [12]CPP, and a trefoil knot of [24]CPP. Solvent atoms and [24]CPP hydrogen atoms excluded for clarity.

== History and development ==
Carbon nanohoops have been a synthetic target since the early 20^{th} century. There were several successful syntheses of large sp^{1}/sp^{2}-carbon macrocycles that lacked the desired radially oriented p-orbitals during the 1980s and 1990s. There was also evidence of short lived all-carbon clusters in the mass spectra of vaporized graphene that were thought to potentially be cyclic. In 1985 buckminsterfullerene and in 1991 cylindrical carbon nanotubes were identified. This lead to a growing interest in strained aromatic systems in the following decades.

=== The road to synthesis ===
Attempts at synthesizing carbon nanohoops started as early as 1934 with the unsuccessful synthesis of [2]CPP and [3]CPP via a Cu-mediated desulfurization of a cyclic polythioether. Other unsuccessful attempts were made by Vögtle in 1993 to synthesize CPPs using intramolecular Diels-Alder, desulfurization, or cyclohexane aromatization as the strain enducing step. Cory and Schlüter made strides towards the synthesis of carbon nanohoops in the 1980s and 1990s. The first cycloparaphenyleneacetylenes were synthesized in 1996 representing an early example of a carbon nanohoop.

=== Early cycloparaphenylenes ===
Synthetic scheme employed by Jasti and Bertozzi for the first synthesis of a CPP.

In 2008 Jasti and Bertozzi were the first to successfully synthesize [9]CPP, [12]CPP, and [18]CPP using 1,4-cyclohexadines in a similar inspired by Vögtle. In 2011 the Itami group synthesized the first chiral CPP derivative with a naphthalene ring replacing one of the phenyl rings. Another method for the synthesis of CPPs was developed by Yamago and involved the reductive elimination of platinum. By 2014 there were pathways for the synthesis of [7]CPP, [6]CPP, and [5]CPP via cyclohexene aromatization.

=== Cages and derivatives ===
Significant work has been done expanding the literature around CPPs and their derivatives from their discovery in 2008 to the mid 2010s. Aromatic groups including naphthalene, pyrene, and various porphyrins have been explored. Aromatic carbon cages and fused rings have been synthesized using similar strategies to the nanohoops. A number of heterocycle containing CPP derivatives have been produced and characterized including thiophene, pyridine, and pyrrole containing CPPs. There has also been significant interest in carbon nanobelts which lack single bonds to rotate around. Similar to CPPs, carbon nanobelts are a segment of a carbon nanotube. There are specific difficulties with the synthesis of [n]cyclacenes. This is due to the lack of a Clar's aromatic sextet in the closed-shell structure making the structure more unstable.

== Synthesis ==
Many successful strategies have been developed for synthesizing carbon nanohoops. Often the most difficult step is the final strain inducing step due to the energetic barrier. Most strategies include using an irreversible redox or elimination reaction for this step.

=== Reduction methods ===
The initial method developed by Jasti was using a non-aryl cyclohexa-1,4-diene-3,6-diol unit bound to short paraphenylenes in a larger heterocycle. Jasti’s method then was to use a lithium salt to achieve two single-electron reductions of methoxy groups aromatizing the cyclohexa-1,4-diene motifs. Other modern techniques for the synthesis of carbon nanohoops include reduction by a low-valent titanium reagent, reductive homocoupling of dibromo molecules, or a Birch reduction.

=== Oxidation methods ===
The method initially proposed by Vögtle and achieve by Itami was an oxidation of a cyclohexadiol. Other oxidative routes include dehydrogenation and oxidative acetylene coupling.

=== Organometallic and other assorted methods ===
Another highly explored method is a organometallic pathway. Yamago and Isobe achieved their cyclization by the reductive elimination of platinum from the cycle, McMurry coupling, olefin metathesis, cross coupling, and others. Other strategies include cycloadditions and pericyclic rearrangements.

[5]CPP 3D Model. Optimized geometry using B3LYP/6-31G(d) and manipulated using MeshLab.

== Properties ==
Due to their cyclic structure and electronics carbon nanohoops have a variety of notable optical and supramolecular properties. The conjugated nature of carbon nanohoops can lead to interesting geometric properties such as chirality or Möbius like configurations.

=== Host-guest chemistry ===
The primary guests explored for carbon nanohoops are fullerenes and their derivatives. Due to the π-π interactions between the carbon nanohoop and the surface of the fullerene this tends to be a highly favorable guest with examples found with C_{50}, C_{60}, C_{70}, metallofullerenes, and their derivatives. There are also examples of Russian doll complexes where one carbon nanohoop sits inside a larger carbon nanohoop as well as complexes containing a segment of a carbon nanotube. The host guest complexes with fullerenes have useful properties such as charge transfer complexes. Carbon nanohoops with aromatic units generally act as electron donors while those with antiaromatic units are electron acceptors. [10]CPP has been used to create a molecular dyads between donors and acceptors.

=== Optical properties ===
CPPs have size dependent optical properties inverse from linear [n]paraphenylenes and other conjugated dyes. As the size of the carbon nanohoop decreases the HOMO-LUMO gap also decreases due to the strain induced decrease in torsional angle and a Laporte forbidden HOMO-LUMO transition. Size dependent optical properties have been used to improve technology with QLEDs.

=== Rotaxanes and catenanes ===
There are several classes of topologically interesting carbon nanohoops including Möbius carbon nanobelts, interlocked catenanes, trefoil knots, and rotaxanes.
