= Endohedral fullerene =

Fullerene molecule with additional atoms, ions, or clusters enclosed within itself

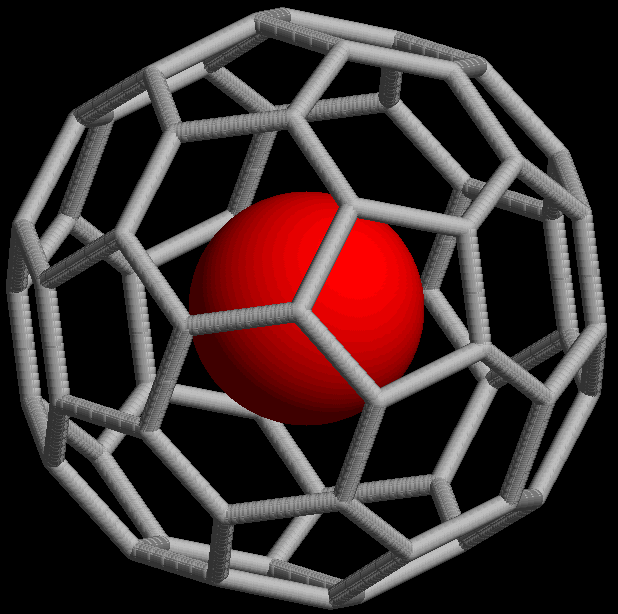
Rendering of a buckminsterfullerene containing a noble gas atom (M@C_{60}).

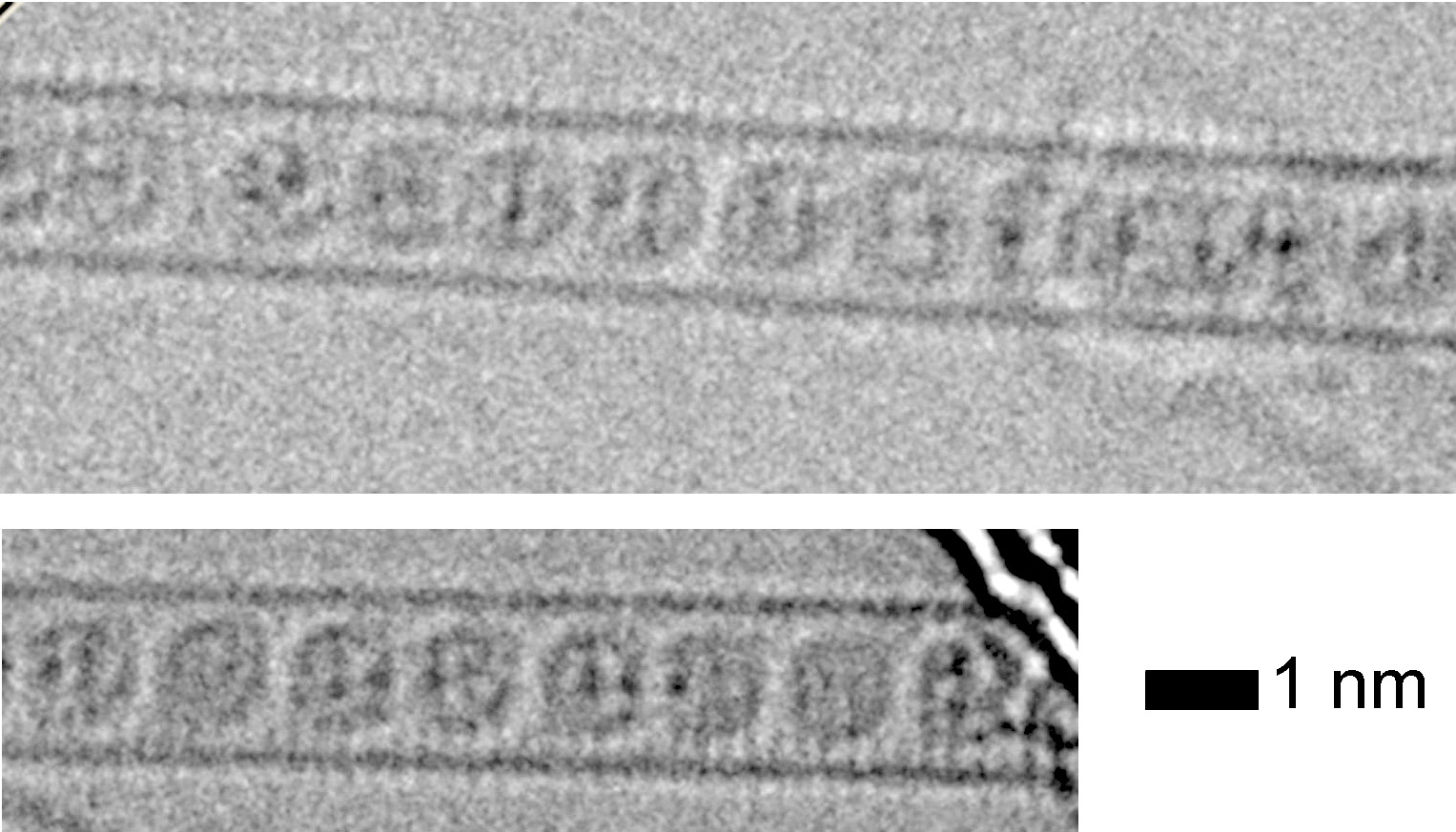
Electron microscopy images of M_{3}N@C_{80} peapods. Metal atoms (M = Ho or Sc) are seen as dark spots inside the fullerene molecules; they are doubly encapsulated in the C_{80} molecules and in the nanotubes.

Endohedral fullerenes, also called endofullerenes, are fullerenes that have additional atoms, ions, or clusters enclosed within their inner spheres. The first lanthanum C_{60} complex called La@C_{60} was synthesized in 1985. The @ (at sign) in the name reflects the notion of a small molecule trapped inside a shell. Two types of endohedral complexes exist: endohedral metallofullerenes and non-metal doped fullerenes.

== Notation ==
In a traditional chemical formula notation, a buckminsterfullerene (C_{60}) with an atom (M) was simply represented as MC_{60} regardless of whether M was inside or outside the fullerene. In order to allow for more detailed discussions with minimal loss of information, a more explicit notation was proposed in 1991, where the atoms listed to the left of the @ sign are situated inside the network composed of the atoms listed to the right. The example above would then be denoted M@C_{60} if M were inside the carbon network. A more complex example is K_{2}(K@C_{59}B), which denotes "a 60-atom fullerene cage with one boron atom substituted for a carbon in the geodesic network, a single potassium trapped inside, and two potassium atoms adhering to the outside."

The choice of the symbol has been explained by the authors as being concise, readily printed and transmitted electronically (the at sign is included in ASCII, which most modern character encoding schemes are based on), and the visual aspects suggesting the structure of an endohedral fullerene.

== Endohedral metallofullerenes ==
Doping fullerenes with electropositive metals takes place in a 1 kV direct current arc reactor or via laser evaporation. Synthesis is unspecific, and (for unclear reasons) only relatively noncoordinating metals can be inserted this way. Thus endofullerenes containing rare earth metals like scandium, yttrium, and the lanthanides; alkaline earth metals like barium and strontium; alkali metals like potassium; and certain tetravalent metals like uranium, zirconium and hafnium, have all been demonstrated, but not the other transition metals. The other transition metals, do, however, catalyze metal insertion.

Besides unfilled fullerenes, endohedral metallofullerenes develop with different cage sizes like La@C_{60} or La@C_{82} and as different isomer cages. Aside from the dominant presence of mono-metal cages, numerous di-metal endohedral complexes and the tri-metal carbide fullerenes like Sc_{3}C_{2}@C_{80} were also isolated.

In 1999 a discovery drew large attention. With the synthesis of the Sc_{3}N@C_{80} by Harry Dorn and coworkers, the inclusion of a molecule fragment in a fullerene cage had succeeded for the first time. This compound can be prepared by arc-vaporization at temperatures up to 1100 °C of graphite rods packed with scandium(III) oxide iron nitride and graphite powder in a K-H generator in a nitrogen atmosphere at 300 Torr.

Endohedral metallofullerenes are characterised by the fact that electrons will transfer from the metal atom to the fullerene cage and that the metal atom takes a position off-center in the cage. The size of the charge transfer is not always simple to determine. In most cases it is between 2 and 3 charge units, in the case of the La_{2}@C_{80} however it can be even about 6 electrons such as in Sc_{3}N@C_{80} which is better described as [Sc_{3}N]^{+6}@[C_{80}]^{−6}. These anionic fullerene cages are very stable molecules and do not have the reactivity associated with ordinary empty fullerenes. They are stable in air up to very high temperatures (600 to 850 °C).

The lack of reactivity in Diels-Alder reactions is utilised in a method to purify [C_{80}]^{−6} compounds from a complex mixture of empty and partly filled fullerenes of different cage size. In this method Merrifield resin is modified as a cyclopentadienyl resin and used as a solid phase against a mobile phase containing the complex mixture in a column chromatography operation. Only very stable fullerenes such as [Sc_{3}N]^{+6}@[C_{80}]^{−6} pass through the column unreacted.

In Ce_{2}@C_{80} the two metal atoms exhibit a non-bonded interaction. Since all the six-membered rings in C_{80}-I_{h} are equal the two encapsulated Ce atoms exhibit a three-dimensional random motion. This is evidenced by the presence of only two signals in the ^{13}C-NMR spectrum. It is possible to force the metal atoms to a standstill at the equator as shown by x-ray crystallography when the fullerene is exohedrally functionalized by an electron donation silyl group in a reaction of Ce_{2}@C_{80} with 1,1,2,2-tetrakis(2,4,6-trimethylphenyl)-1,2-disilirane.

Gd@C_{82}(OH)_{22}, an endohedral metallofullerenol, can competitively inhibit the WW domain in the oncogene YAP1 from activating. It was originally developed as an MRI contrast agent.

== Non-metal doped fullerenes ==
Endohedral complexes He@C_{60} and Ne@C_{60} are prepared by pressurizing C_{60} to ca. 3 bar in a noble-gas atmosphere. Under these conditions about one out of every 650,000 C_{60} cages was doped with a helium atom. The formation of endohedral complexes with helium, neon, argon, krypton and xenon as well as numerous adducts of the He@C_{60} compound was also demonstrated with pressures of 3 kbars and incorporation of up to 0.1% of the noble gases.

While noble gases are chemically very inert and commonly exist as individual atoms, this is not the case for nitrogen and phosphorus and so the formation of the endohedral complexes N@C_{60}, N@C_{70} and P@C_{60} is more surprising. The nitrogen atom is in its electronic initial state (^{4}S_{3/2}) and is highly reactive. Nevertheless, N@C_{60} is sufficiently stable that exohedral derivatization from the mono- to the hexa adduct of the malonic acid ethyl ester is possible. In these compounds no charge transfer of the nitrogen atom in the center to the carbon atoms of the cage takes place. Therefore, ^{13}C-couplings, which are observed very easily with the endohedral metallofullerenes, could only be observed in the case of the N@C_{60} in a high resolution spectrum as shoulders of the central line.

The central atom in these endohedral complexes is located in the center of the cage. While other atomic traps require complex equipment, e.g. laser cooling or magnetic traps, endohedral fullerenes represent an atomic trap that is stable at room temperature and for an arbitrarily long time. Atomic or ion traps are of great interest since particles are present free from (significant) interaction with their environment, allowing unique quantum mechanical phenomena to be explored. For example, the compression of the atomic wave function as a consequence of the packing in the cage could be observed with ENDOR spectroscopy. The nitrogen atom can be used as a probe, in order to detect the smallest changes of the electronic structure of its environment.

Contrary to the metallo endohedral compounds, these complexes cannot be produced in an arc. Atoms are implanted in the fullerene starting material using gas discharge (nitrogen and phosphorus complexes) or by direct ion implantation. Alternatively, endohedral hydrogen fullerenes can be produced by opening and closing a fullerene by organic chemistry methods. A recent example of endohedral fullerenes includes single molecules of water encapsulated in C_{60}.

Noble gas endofullerenes are predicted to exhibit unusual polarizability. Thus, calculated values of mean polarizability of Ng@C_{60} do not equal to the sum of polarizabilities of a fullerene cage and the trapped atom, i.e. exaltation of polarizability occurs. The sign of the Δα polarizability exaltation depends on the number of atoms in a fullerene molecule: for small fullerenes ($n<30$), it is positive; for the larger ones ($n>30$), it is negative (depression of polarizability). The following formula, describing the dependence of Δα on n, has been proposed: Δα = α_{Ng}(2e^{−0.06(n – 20)}−1). It describes the DFT-calculated mean polarizabilities of Ng@C_{60} endofullerenes with sufficient accuracy. The calculated data allows using C_{60} fullerene as a Faraday cage, which isolates the encapsulated atom from the external electric field. The mentioned relations should be typical for the more complicated endohedral structures (e.g., C_{60}@C_{240} and giant fullerene-containing "onions").

== Molecular endofullerenes ==
Closed fullerenes encapsulating small molecules have been synthesized. Representative are the synthesis of the dihydrogen endofullerene H_{2}@C_{60}, the water endofullerene H_{2}O@C_{60}, the hydrogen fluoride endofullerene HF@C_{60}, and the methane endofullerene CH_{4}@C_{60}. The encapsulated molecules display unusual physical properties which have been studied by a variety of physical methods. As shown theoretically, compression of molecular endofullerenes (e.g., H_{2}@C_{60}) may lead to dissociation of the encapsulated molecules and reaction of their fragments with interiors of the fullerene cage. Such reactions should result in endohedral fullerene adducts, which are currently unknown.

== See also ==
- Fullerene ligands
- Inclusion compounds
