= Endohedral hydrogen fullerene =

Endohedral fullerene containing molecular hydrogen

Endohedral hydrogen fullerene (H_{2}@C_{60}) is an endohedral fullerene containing molecular hydrogen. This chemical compound has a potential application in molecular electronics and was synthesized in 2005 at Kyoto University by the group of Koichi Komatsu. Ordinarily the payload of endohedral fullerenes are inserted at the time of the synthesis of the fullerene itself or is introduced to the fullerene at very low yields at high temperatures and high pressure. This particular fullerene was synthesised in an unusual way in three steps starting from pristine C_{60} fullerene: cracking open the carbon framework, insert hydrogen gas and zipping up by organic synthesis methods.

== Organic synthesis ==
Scheme 1 presents an overview of the first step, the creation of a 13 membered ring orifice on the fullerene surface. A 1,2,4-triazine 2 is fitted with two phenyl groups and a pyridine group for reasons of solubility and reacted in 1,2-dichlorobenzene with pristine C_{60} fullerene 2 in a Diels-Alder reaction at high temperature and for an extended reaction time. In this reaction nitrogen is expulsed and an 8-membered ring is formed (3). This orifice is further extended by reaction with singlet oxygen in carbon tetrachloride which causes one of the ring alkene groups to oxidize to a ketone. The 12-ring is extended to a 13-ring by reaction with elemental sulfur in presence of tetrakis(dimethylamino)ethylene.

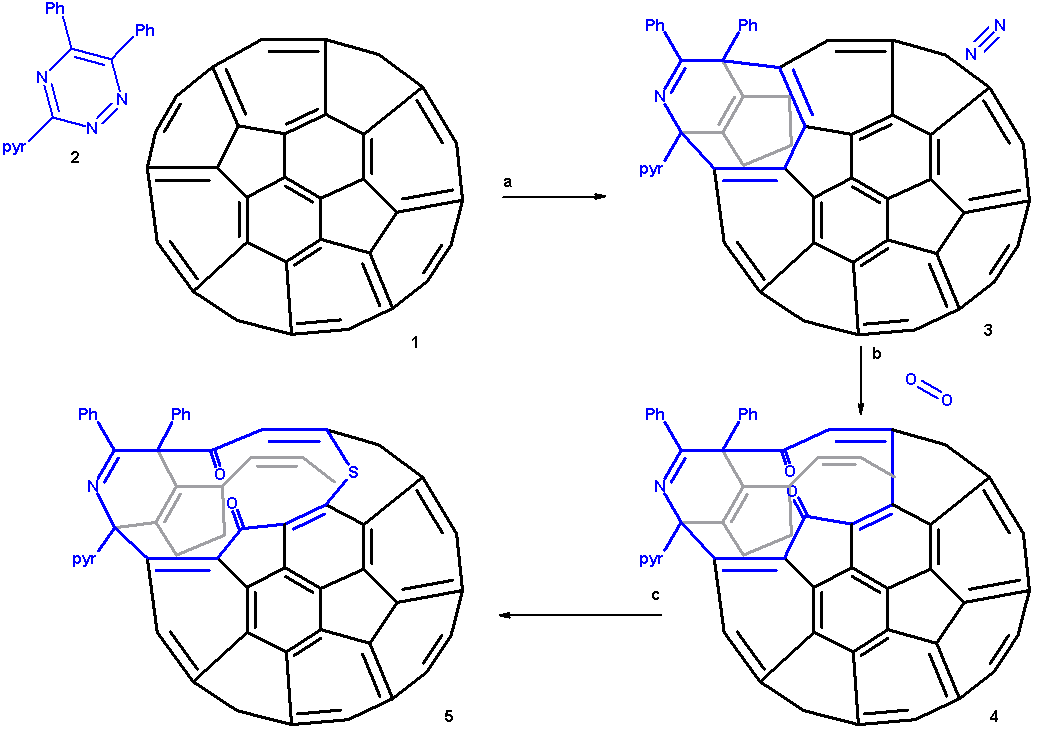
Scheme 1. Endohedral hydrogen fullerene overview

The proposed reaction mechanism is depicted in a plat surface rendition in scheme 2. In the first step the triazine reacts with the fullerene in a Diels-Alder reaction. In the second step nitrogen is expulsed from the DA adduct 2 resulting in the formation of a fused aza-cyclohexadiene ring followed by a [4+4]cycloaddition to an intermediate 4 with two cyclopropane rings. This intermediate quickly rearranges in a retro [2+2+2]cycloaddition to the 8 membered ring product 5. In silico calculations show that the electrons in the HOMO reside primarily in the double bonds of the butadiene part of the ring and indeed singlet oxygen reacts at these positions through the dioxetane intermediate 6 with alkene cleavage to diketone 7 (only one isomer shown). Elemental sulfur S_{8} is inserted into the single bond of the diene group leading to the extension of the ring to 13 atoms (structures 8 and 9 are identical). Tetrakis(dimethylamino)ethylene activates this bond for electrophilic sulfur addition either by one-electron reduction or by complexation.

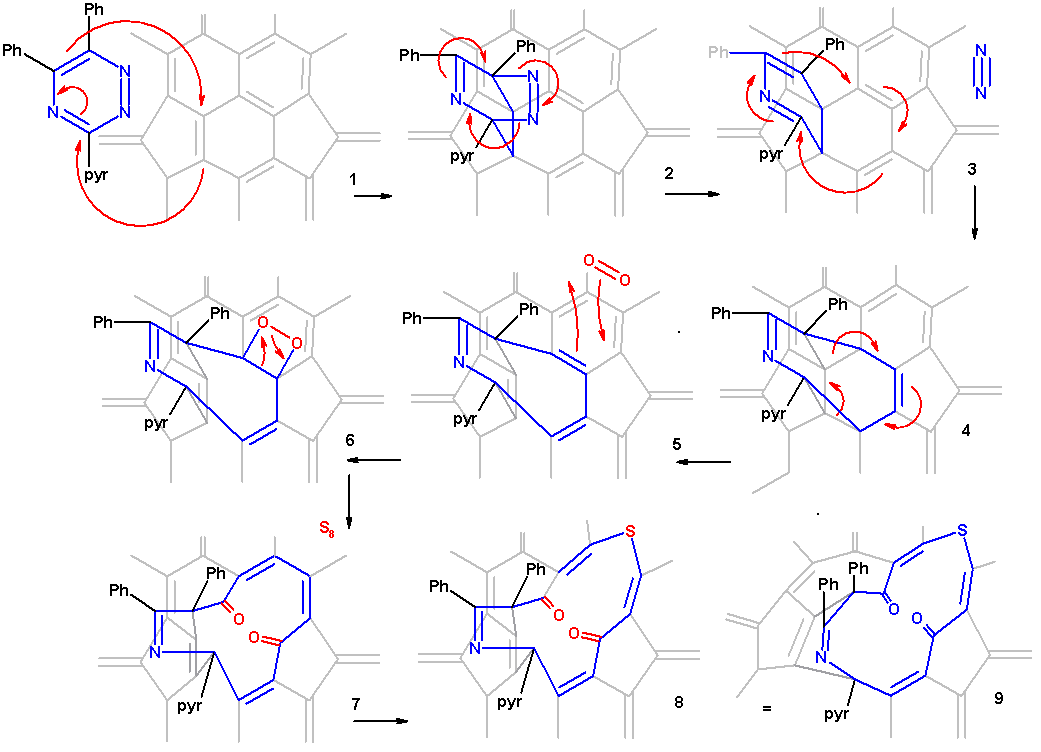
Scheme 2. Endohedral hydrogen fullerene mechanism

From X-ray crystallography it is determined that the shape of the orifice in the sulfur compound is roughly a circle. Inserting hydrogen in this compound is an easy step taking place with 100% efficiency. Zipping up the orifice is a reversal of the steps required to open the cage. Care must be taken to keep the reaction conditions below 160 °C on order to prevent hydrogen from escaping. m-CPBA oxidizes the sulfur group to a sulfoxide group which can then be extracted from the ring by a photochemical reaction under visible light in toluene. The two ketone groups are re-coupled in a McMurry reaction with titanium tetrachloride and elemental zinc. The reverse cycloadditions take place at 340 °C in a vacuum splitting of 2-cyanopyridine and diphenylacetylene resulting in the formation of H_{2}@C_{60} at a 40% chemical yield starting from pristine fullerene.

== Properties ==
H_{2}@C_{60} is found to be a stable molecule. it survives 10 minutes at 500 °C and shows the same chemical reactivity as empty C_{60}. The electronic properties are also largely unaffected.

The process of hydrogen introduction and release can be facilitated by increasing the size of the orifice. This can be done by replacing sulfur by selenium (sodium thiolate, Se_{8}) exploiting larger C-Se bond length. Filling cracked-open fullerene now takes 8 hours at 190 °C at 760 atmospheres (77 MPa) of hydrogen and release between 150 °C and 180 °C is three times as fast compared to the sulfur analogue. The activation energy for release is lowered by 0.7 kcal/mol to 28.2 kcal/mol (2.9 to 118 kJ/mol).

There is evidence that hydrogen in the fullerene cage is not completely shielded from the outside world as one study found that H_{2}@C_{60} is more efficient at quenching singlet oxygen than empty C_{60}.
