= Harry C. Dorn =

American chemist (1943–2026)

Harry Conrad Dorn
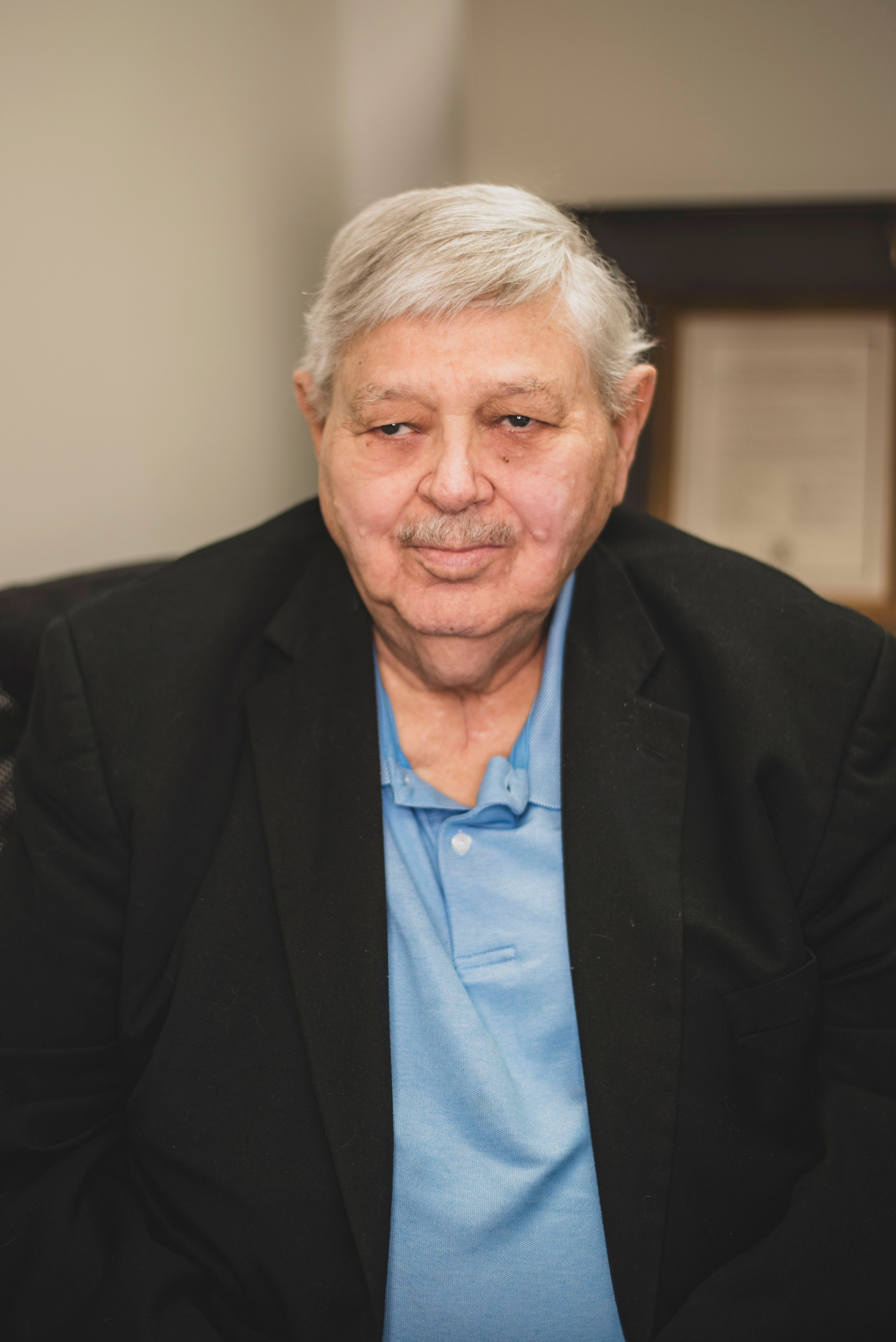
- Born: August 13, 1943; Mobile, Alabama, U.S.
- Died: August 6, 2026 (aged 82); Blacksburg, Virginia, U.S.
- Occupations: Chemist and academic
- Title: Professor emeritus of chemistry
- Spouse: Linda Lee Collins (m. 1964)
- Children: 4
- Awards: IBM Research Award (1991); A.C. Lilly Faculty Fellow of Nanoscience (2010)

Academic background
- Education: BSc Chemistry, UCSB; PhD Chemistry, UCSD
- Alma mater: University of California, Santa Barbara (BSc); University of California, Davis (PhD)

Academic work
- Discipline: Chemistry, nanomaterials, NMR
- Institutions: Virginia Tech

Harry Conrad Dorn (August 13, 1943 – August 6, 2026) was an American chemist and a professor of chemistry at Virginia Tech from 1974 until his retirement in 2024. He was granted the title of professor emeritus by the Virginia Tech Board of Visitors in 2025. He was also a professor of Radiology at Virginia Tech Carilion School of Medicine and a professor at Virginia Tech Fralin Biomedical Research Institute from 2012 to 2017.

Dorn's research interests were focused on fullerenes, fullertubes, metallofullerenes, nanoparticles, and chemistry. He was best known for his work on the development and applications of nuclear magnetic resonance (NMR), dynamic nuclear polarization (DNP), and the discovery and functionalization of carbonaceous nanomaterials. Over his career, Dorn's laboratory reported the discovery of more than 100 new fullerene, fullertube, and metallofullerene molecules, described across more than 200 scientific papers.

== Early life and education ==
Dorn was born in Mobile, Alabama, on August 13, 1943, to Leonard Eugene Dorn and Elizabeth Claire Dorn. The family moved to Riverdale, a rural agricultural town in California's Central Valley near Fresno, in 1946. His interest in science was sparked by his high school science teacher, Mr. Pielop, who told him that university faculty were paid to conduct research as well as teach.

He pursued his higher education within the University of California system. He first attended the University of California, Santa Barbara (UCSB), where he graduated with a Bachelor of Science (BS) degree. He then continued his academic training at the University of California, Davis (UC Davis), where he earned his Doctor of Philosophy (PhD) in chemistry. During his time completing his graduate studies, Dorn also married his wife, Linda Lee Collins, in 1964.

Dorn received a Bachelor of Science degree in chemistry in 1966 from the University of California, Santa Barbara followed by a PhD in Chemistry from the University of California, Davis in 1974.

== Career ==
Starting his academic career in 1974, Dorn worked at the Virginia Polytechnic Institute and State University, where he held various positions including assistant professor of Chemistry and Associate Professor of Chemistry, until 1985.

During the 1990s, Dorn worked with physicist Lay Nam Chang, then chair of Virginia Tech's Department of Physics and later founding dean of the College of Science, to help establish the university's nanoscience program.

Dorn was the director of the Center for Self-Assembled Nanoscale Devices (CSAND) and the Carbonaceous Nanomaterials Center (CNC) from 2005 to 2010.

From 2012 to 2017, he held concurrent appointments as professor at the Virginia Tech Carilion (now Fralin Biomedical) Research Institute, professor of radiology at the Virginia Tech Carilion School of Medicine, and professor of chemistry at the Virginia Tech College of Science, during which he mentored several medical students.

=== Retirement ===
Dorn retired from teaching in 2024 after 50 years on the Virginia Tech faculty. He was granted the title of professor emeritus by the Virginia Tech Board of Visitors in 2025 in recognition of his service to the university. Reflecting on his career, Dorn said the value he most sought to uphold was to "maintain integrity."

== Research ==
=== Nuclear magnetic resonance spectroscopy (NMR) and dynamic nuclear polarization (DNP) ===
Dorn's early research offers an approach for the direct monitoring of supercritical fluids and chromatographic separations using 1H nuclear magnetic resonance and provides details into how NMR-based direct monitoring enhances process efficiency through real-time information acquisition on composition changes during separation stages. His research has proposed the coupling of the hydrogen nuclear magnetic resonance detector to the liquid chromatographic unit for identifying and differentiating various components present in jet and diesel fuel samples, such as alkylbenzenes, alkanes, and substituted naphthalenes. Furthermore, his work established the superiority of this approach over conventional methods such as refractive index detectors (RI). His work highlighted the potential of combining LC-^1H NMR and GC-MS techniques for more precise analysis of volatile samples. Later studies were expanded to the related magnetic resonance phenomena, dynamic nuclear polarization (DNP) which can allow greater NMR sensitivity and a fundamental understanding of electron-nuclear molecular interactions.

=== Discovery and biomedical applications of carbonaceous nanoparticles ===
During the early 1990s, Dorn in collaboration with scientists at IBM, published the first bond length measurements and solid-state dynamics of the soccer ball-shaped fullerene C60. In 1999, he and Stevenson, with X-ray structure determination reported a new family of trimetallic nitride template (TNT) endohedral metallofullerenes EMFs, M3N@C80 (M = Group IIIB and lanthanide metal ions) with the M3N metal cluster encapsulated in a high symmetry icosahedral fullerene cage, C80. His early research demonstrated that a functionalized Gd EMF nanoparticle could potentially serve as an effective contrast agent for MRI scans and be used in drug delivery systems. While exploring ways to produce nanoparticles with surface-bound proteins, his research substantiated that the processing conditions greatly influenced the localization of the protein outside the nanoparticle, thereby emphasizing the need to carefully select the appropriate processing method and conditions to achieve the desired protein localization and maximize the efficacy targeting of the nanoparticles for drug delivery, vaccine development, and biomedical imaging. In collaboration with Li on the potential application of amine functionalized TNT Endohedral metallofullerenes in the treatment of lower back and leg pain, his work demonstrated that these particles possess analgesic and anti-inflammatory properties in both in vitro and model studies, precisely due to their ability to scavenge free radicals and modulate inflammatory pathways, thereby providing a potential therapeutic approach for managing lower leg and back pain.

In a collaborative study with Steven Stevenson, Dorn discovered a new form of carbon that represents a marriage of fullerenes and single-walled nanotubes SWNTs called fullertubes. The structure of these soluble all carbon fullertubes have C60 hemispheres capped on the ends of SWNTs. As of February 2023, this paper has an altmetric score of all outputs from JACS of 96%.

== Personal life and death ==
Dorn married Linda Lee Collins in 1964; they remained married until his death in 2026. They had four sons and seven grandchildren. Dorn and his wife were members of Virginia Tech's Ut Prosim Society. Dorn died on August 6, 2026, a week before his 83rd birthday.

== Awards and honors ==
- 1991 – IBM Research Award, IBM
- 2004 – Recognized by U.S. Senator George Allen for the discovery of trimetallic nitride template (TNT) endohedral metallofullerenes, U.S. Senate Building
- 2006 – Alumni Award for Research Excellence, Virginia Tech
- 2007 – John C. Schug Research Award, Virginia Tech Department of Chemistry
- 2010 – A.C. Lilly Faculty Fellow of Nanoscience, Virginia Polytechnic Institute & State University
- 2025 – Professor emeritus, Virginia Tech

== Selected articles ==
- Hedberg, K., Hedberg, L., Bethune, D. S., Brown, C. A., Dorn, H. C., Johnson, R. D., & De Vries, M. (1991). Bond lengths in free molecules of buckminsterfullerene, C60, from gas-phase electron diffraction. Science, 254(5030), 410–412.
- Johnson, R. D., Yannoni, C. S., Dorn, H. C., Salem, J. R., & Bethune, D. S. (1992). C60 rotation in the solid state: Dynamics of a faceted spherical top. Science, 255(5049), 1235–1238.
- Stevenson, S., Rice, G., Glass, T., Harich, K., Cromer, F., Jordan, M. R., ... & Dorn, A. H. (1999). Small-bandgap endohedral metallofullerenes in high yield and purity. Nature, 401(6748), 55–57.
- Stevenson, S., Fowler, P. W., Heine, T., Duchamp, J. C., Rice, G., Glass, T., ... & Dorn, H. C. (2000). A stable non-classical metallofullerene family. Nature, 408(6811), 427–428.
- Olmstead, M. M., de Bettencourt-Dias, A., Duchamp, J. C., Stevenson, S., Marciu, D., Dorn, H. C., & Balch, A. L. (2001). Isolation and structural characterization of the endohedral fullerene Sc3 N@ C78. Angewandte Chemie International Edition, 40(7), 1223–1225
- Zhang, J.; Stevenson, S.; Dorn, H.C. (2013) Trimetallic Nitride Endohedral Metallofullerenes: Discovery, Structural Characterization, Reactivity, and Applications. Accounts of Chemical Research, 46(7), 1548–1557.
- Liu, X.; Bourret, E.; Noble, C. A.; Cover, K.; Koenig, R. M.; Huang, R.; Franklin, H. M.; Xu Feng, Bodnar, R. J.; Zhang, F.; Tao, C.; Sublett, M. D.; Dorn, H. C. Stevenson, S.; Gigantic C_{120} Fullertubes: Prediction and Experimental Evidence for Isomerically Purified Metallic [5, 5] C_{120}-D_{5}d and Nonmetallic [10,0] C_{120}-D_{5h} (10766). Journal of the American Chemical Society 144 (36), 16287-16291 (2022).
- Bourret, E.; Liu, X.; Noble, C. A.; Cover, K.; Davidson, T. P.; Huang, R.; Koenig, R. M.; Reeves, K. S.; Vlassiouk, I. V.; Côté, M.; Baxter, J. S.; Lupini, A. R.; Geohegan, D. B.; Dorn, H. C.; Stevenson, S.; Colossal C_{130} Fullertubes: Soluble [5,5] C130-D5h(1) Pristine Molecules with 70 Nanotube Carbons and Two 30-Atom Hemifullerene End-Caps. Journal of the American Chemical Society 145 (48), 25942–25947 (2023).
