= Arylene =

An arylene or arenediyl is a substituent of an organic compound that is derived from an aromatic hydrocarbon (arene) and is bivalent, such as phenylene.

== See also ==
- Aromatic hydrocarbon
- Aromaticity
