= Cyclacene =

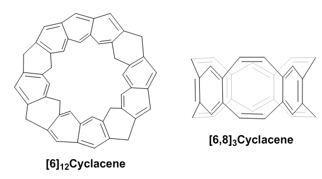
Fig. 1: Examples of cyclacenes

Cyclacenes are hoop-like polycyclic compounds where aromatic moieties are fused together to form the ring structures. Because of their interesting electronic and structural properties as well as their potential applications in supramolecular chemistry and molecular recognition, cyclacenes have drawn much attention from organic chemists and been viewed as interesting yet challenging synthetic targets. Pioneering efforts by Fraser Stoddart and co-workers in the late 1980s and following work from other groups embarked on the synthesis of various cyclacenes. Figure 1 shows two examples of cyclacenes that have been synthesized.

== Synthesis ==
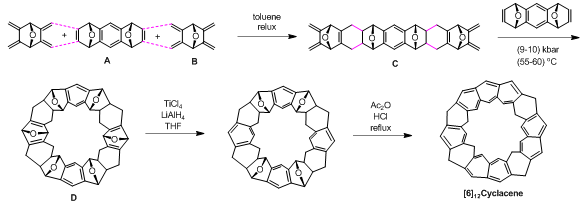
Fig. 2: Synthesis of [6]_{12}cyclacene by Stoddart and co-workers.

Cyclacenes are synthesized usually via interactive reactions to construct the repetitive units in the ring structure. Stoddart and co-workers synthesized [6]_{12}cyclacene through interactive Diels-Alder reactions. Reacting 7-oxoanorbornene derivative A with bisdienophile B generated intermediate C in good yield (Fig. 2). Compound C further reacted with A under high pressure to close the ring structure and afforded compound D with 12 consecutive six-membered rings fused together. To convert compound D to [6]_{12}cyclacene, Stoddart and co-workers used a two-step process where the 6 ether linkages in D were removed and additional double bonds were generated to afford the π-systems in the final product.

== See also ==
- Acene
- Circulene
- Cycloparaphenylene
- Carbon nanotube
- Carbon nanohoop
