= Phenylene group =

Chemical group (–C6H4–); benzene with two substituents

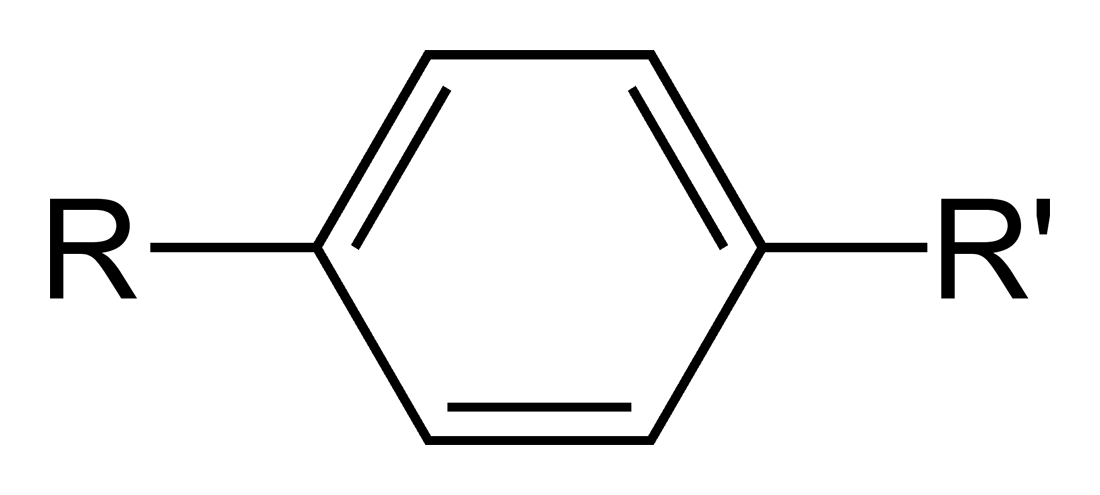
The chemical structure of the para-phenylene group.

In organic chemistry, the phenylene group (−C_{6}H_{4}−) is based on a di-substituted benzene ring (arylene). For example, poly(p-phenylene) is a polymer built up from para-phenylene repeating units. The phenylene group has three structural isomers, based on which hydrogens are substituted: para-phenylene, meta-phenylene, and ortho-phenylene.

Isomer naming convention

== See also ==
- Cycloparaphenylene
- Carbon nanohoop
