= Jasti Eswara Prasad =

Indian judge (1934–2021)

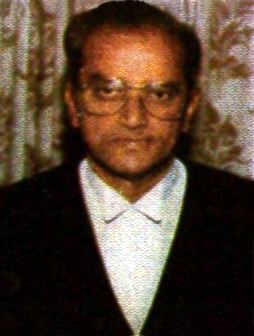

Judge, High Court of Andhra Pradesh
- In office March 1990 – April 1994

Justice, Karnataka High Court
- In office April 1994 – August 1996

Chairman of the Special Court
- In office January 1997 – March 1997

Chairman of the Appellate Tribunal for Forfeited Property
- In office March 1997 – March 2003

Personal details
- Born: 4 August 1934 Madras, India
- Died: 6 July 2021 (aged 86)
- Spouse: Jasti Chamanthi

Jasti Eswara Prasad (4 August 1934 – 6 July 2021) was an Indian judge. He served as judge of the High Court of Andhra Pradesh and High Court of Karnataka.

== Early life ==
Prasad was born at Madras in a family of lawyers. His father, the late J. Sambasiva Rao Chowdary, was a judicial officer, who retired as a district and sessions judge. His mother, late J. Seetamahalakshmi, was a leading lawyer of Madras and A.P. High Courts and was an M.L.C. As a child, Prasad had paralysis. In a miraculous sequence of events, he was cured of it overnight after a lady advised his mother, J. Seetamahalakshmi, and him to pray to Sathya Sai Baba. Prasad graduated from Madras University, and graduated in law from Osmania University. He enrolled as an advocate in 1959 and was an apprentice and junior in the chambers of his mother. Subsequently, he was judge of the Karnataka High Court from April 1994 until his retirement in August 1996, overseeing constitutional, civil, taxation and criminal cases. One high-profile case related to secularism and the role of the State.

In January 1997 he was appointed chairman of the Special Court under the Andhra Pradesh Land Grabbing Prohibition Act. He streamlined the administration of the court and disposed of several cases and put a halt to the land-grabbing activities.

Subsequently, he was appointed chairman of the Appellate Tribunal for Forfeited Property, New Delhi in March 1997 for a period of three years, was reappointed in March 2000 and held the post until his retirement in March 2003. Prasad took steps to ensure implementation of the statutory provisions prohibiting the trade in drugs, foreign exchange manipulation and smuggling. He conducted proceedings of the Tribunal in various parts of the country, addressing and meeting with senior officers of the State and Central Governments.

Prasad organized two national level seminars at New Delhi on combating terrorism and other crimes through Forfeiture of Property and on Curbing Smuggling and Foreign Exchange Manipulations. The seminars were addressed by the Chief Justice of India, several union ministers, judges of the Supreme Court and High Court, senior officers and others.

Prasad passed orders upholding the forfeiture of large properties of terrorists and smugglers in the country. Justice Eswara Prasad had also suggested several amendments to the law, both as a judge as well as Chairman of the Tribunal, for removing loopholes in the law and for their proper implementation, many of which have been enacted.

== Death ==
Justice Eswara Prasad died on the 6th of July, 2021. He was admitted at a local hospital and passed due to heart failure.
