= Kenichiro Itami =

Japanese chemist (born 1971)

- Born: April 4, 1971 (age 55); Pennsylvania, United States
- Citizenship: Japan
- Education: Chemistry, Kyoto University, Japan
- Known for: Synthesis of Carbon Nanobelt
- Awards: Arthur C. Cope Scholar Award (2015)
- Scientific career
- Fields: Chemistry; Organic chemistry Synthetic chemistry Nanocarbon chemistry Molecular catalytic chemistry
- Workplaces: Kyoto University; Nagoya University
- Thesis: Transition Metal Catalyzed Cycloaddition of Vinylallenes
- Doctoral advisor: Yoshihiko Ito

Kenichiro Itami (伊丹 健一郎, Itami Ken'ichirō; born April 4, 1971) is a Japanese chemist. He is a professor at Nagoya University in the Department of Chemistry, Graduate School of Science, director of Institute of Transformative Bio-Molecules (WPI-ITbM), Nagoya University and the Research Director of the Itami Molecular Nanocarbon Project (JST-ERATO). He received his Ph.D. in Engineering from the Department of Synthetic Chemistry and Biological Chemistry from Kyoto University. Itami was held responsible, and the Japan Science and Technology Agency (JST) and the Japan Society for the Promotion of Science (JSPS), which determine the allocation of government research funds, have stopped granting research funds as a penalty until the end of March 2025 from the university. Despite this, RIKEN, which is funded mainly by research fees from the government, hired Itami and obtained about 50 million yen in research funding. He pioneered a loophole that allowed him to obtain research funding by belonging to a national research corporation even if his research funding from the government was suspended due to research misconduct.

== Biography ==
Ken’ichiro Itami was born in Pennsylvania, United States. After receiving his Ph.D. under the supervision of Yoshihiki Ito, he was appointed as an assistant professor in Jun-ichi Yoshida’s lab in Kyoto University. Later in 2005, he was promoted to associate professor in Ryōji Noyori's laboratory in Nagoya University, where he later started his own laboratory in 2008. His research interests include the development of new strategies and methodologies in catalytic molecular synthesis through C–H transformation, rapid synthesis of new bioactive molecules, pharmaceutically relevant molecules and natural products, synthesis and properties of optoelectronic materials and controlled bottom-up synthesis of nanocarbons. In 2017 and 2018, he was selected as a Highly Cited Researcher by Clarivate Analytics.

Academic career

- 1990–1994 B.S. in Chemistry, Department of Synthetic Chemistry, Kyoto University (Prof. Hisanobu Ogoshi)
- 1994–1998 Ph.D. in Chemistry, Department of Synthetic Chemistry and Biological Chemistry, Kyoto University (Prof. Yoshihiko Ito)
- 1998–2005 Assistant Professor, Department of Synthetic Chemistry and Biological Chemistry, Kyoto University (Prof. Jun-ichi Yoshida)
- 2005–2008 Associate Professor, Research Center of Materials Science, Nagoya University (Prof. Ryōji Noyori)
- 2005–2009 PRESTO Researcher, Japan Science and Technology (JST), PRESTO Program
- 2008–present Professor, Department of Chemistry, Graduate School of Science, Nagoya University
- 2012–present Director, Institute of Transformative Bio-Molecules (WPI-ITbM), Nagoya University
- 2013–present Research Director, JST, ERATO, Itami Molecular Nanocarbon Project

== Scientific retractions ==
The Itami group retracted a study on graphene nanoribbons after being unable to reproduce a graduate-student researcher's results. As a result of problems associated with several research papers, in 2022 Itami was banned for three years from receiving research support from the Japan Society for the Promotion of Science. As of 2023, the research misconduct has led to three of Itami's research publications being retracted and one other paper receiving an expression of concern. Itami requested retraction of the papers in question once he realized he could not reproduce the results.

== Finding loopholes during the suspension of government research funding ==
Itami was held responsible, and the Japan Science and Technology Agency (JST) and the Japan Society for the Promotion of Science (JSPS), which determine the allocation of government research funds, have stopped granting research funds as a penalty until the end of March 2025 from the university. Despite this, RIKEN, which is funded mainly by research fees from the government, hired Itami and obtained about 50 million yen in research funding. He pioneered a loophole that allowed him to obtain research funding by belonging to a national research corporation even if his research funding from the government was suspended due to research misconduct.

== Research ==
Focusing on connecting molecules to create value, the Itami Group focuses on the development of new catalyst and new reactions for rapid syntheses of functional molecules including small molecules for plant biology and chronobiology, pharmaceuticals, p-conjugated organic materials, and molecular nanocarbons. In 2017, they succeeded in synthesizing the first ‘nanocarbon belt.’

== Awards ==
- 2004 Thieme Journal Award
- 2005 The Chemical Society of Japan Award for Young Chemists
- 2006 Minister Award for Distinguished Young Scientists
- 2011 Nozoe Memorial Award for Young Organic Chemists
- 2012 German Innocation Award 2012
- 2012 Fellow of the Royal Society of Chemistry, UK
- 2013 Asian Rising Star Award, Asian Chemical Congress
- 2013 Mukaiyama Award
- 2014 The JSPS Prize
- 2015 Swiss Chemical Society Lectureship Award
- 2015 Arthur C. Cope Scholar Award, American Chemical Society
- 2016 The Nagase Prize
- 2017 The SYNLETT Best Paper Award 2016, Thieme
- 2017 The Yomiuri Techno Forum Gold Medal Prize
- 2017 The Chinichi Cultural Award
- 2018 The Guthikonda Lecturer, Stanford University
- 2018 The Netherlands Scholar Award for Supramolecular Chemistry
