= Ramesh Jasti =

- Citizenship: American
- Known for: cycloparaphenylenes
- Scientific career
- Fields: chemistry
- Workplaces: University of Oregon
- Doctoral advisor: Scott D. Rychnovsky
- Other academic advisors: Carolyn R. Bertozzi
- Website: jastilab.uoregon.edu

Ramesh Jasti is a professor of organic chemistry at the University of Oregon. He was the first person to synthesize the elusive cycloparaphenylene in 2008 during post doctoral work in the laboratory of Professor Carolyn Bertozzi. He started his laboratory at Boston University where he was the recipient of the NSF CAREER award. His early lab repeatedly broke the record for the synthesis of the smallest cycloparaphenylene known. In 2014, he moved his laboratory to the University of Oregon where he expanded his focus to apply the molecules he discovered in the areas of organic materials, mechanically interlocked molecules, and biology. He is the Director of the Materials Science Institute at the University of Oregon.

== Awards and honors ==
- Fred Morrison Scholarship (1994)
- Thieme Journal Award (2012)
- American Chemical Society Young Academic Investigator Award (2013)
- Boston University Ignition Award (2013)
- Boston University Materials Science and Engineering Innovation Award (2013)
- National Science Foundation CAREER Award (2013)
- Alfred P. Sloan Fellowship (2013)
- Boston University Innovation Professorship (2013)
- Camille Dreyfus Teacher-Scholar Award (2014)

== See also ==
- Cycloparaphenylene
- Carbon nanohoop
