= Phenyl group =

Cyclic chemical group (–C6H5)

Phenyl radical group

In organic chemistry, the phenyl group, or phenyl ring, is a cyclic group of atoms with the formula C_{6}H_{5}−, and is often represented by the pseudoelement symbol Ph (archaically φ) or Ø. The phenyl group is closely related to benzene and can be viewed as a benzene ring, minus a hydrogen atom, which may be replaced by some other element or compound to serve as a functional group. A phenyl group has six carbon atoms bonded together in a hexagonal planar ring, five of which are bonded to individual hydrogen atoms, with the remaining carbon bonded to a substituent. Phenyl groups are commonplace in organic chemistry. Although often depicted with alternating double and single bonds, the phenyl group is chemically aromatic and has equal bond lengths between carbon atoms in the ring.

== Nomenclature ==
Usually, a "phenyl group" is synonymous with C_{6}H_{5}− and is represented by the symbol Ph (archaically, Φ), or Ø. Benzene is sometimes denoted as PhH. Phenyl groups are generally attached to other atoms or groups. For example, triphenylmethane (Ph_{3}CH) has three phenyl groups attached to the same carbon center. Many or even most phenyl compounds are not described with the term "phenyl". For example, the chloro derivative C_{6}H_{5}Cl is normally called chlorobenzene, although it could be called phenyl chloride. In special (and rare) cases, isolated phenyl groups are detected: the phenyl anion (C_{6}H^{−}_{5}), the phenyl cation (C_{6}H^{+}_{5}), and the phenyl radical (C_{6}H^{•}_{5}).

Although Ph and phenyl uniquely denote C_{6}H_{5}−, substituted derivatives also are described using the phenyl terminology. For example, C_{6}H_{4}NO_{2}− is nitrophenyl, and C_{6}F_{5}− is pentafluorophenyl. Monosubstituted phenyl groups (that is, disubstituted benzenes) are associated with electrophilic aromatic substitution reactions and the products follow the arene substitution pattern. So, a given substituted phenyl compound has three isomers, ortho (1,2-disubstitution), meta (1,3-disubstitution) and para (1,4-disubstitution). A disubstituted phenyl compound (trisubstituted benzene) may be, for example, 1,3,5-trisubstituted or 1,2,3-trisubstituted. Higher degrees of substitution, of which the pentafluorophenyl group is an example, exist and are named according to IUPAC nomenclature.

=== Etymology ===
Phenyl is derived from French phényle, which in turn derived from Greek φαίνω (phaino) 'shining', as the first phenyl compounds named were byproducts of making and refining various gases used for lighting. According to McMurry, "The word is derived from Greek pheno 'I bear light', commemorating the discovery of benzene by Michael Faraday in 1825 from the oily residue left by the illuminating gas used in London street lamps."

== Structure, bonding, and characterization ==
Phenyl compounds are derived from benzene (C_{6}H_{6}), at least conceptually and often in terms of their production. In terms of its electronic properties, the phenyl group is related to a vinyl group. It is generally considered an inductively withdrawing group (-I), because of the higher electronegativity of sp^{2} carbon atoms, and a resonance donating group (+M), due to the ability of its π system to donate electron density when conjugation is possible. The phenyl group is hydrophobic. Phenyl groups tend to resist oxidation and reduction. Phenyl groups (like all aromatic compounds) have enhanced stability in comparison to equivalent bonding in aliphatic (non-aromatic) groups. This increased stability is due to the unique properties of aromatic molecular orbitals.

The bond lengths between carbon atoms in a phenyl group are approximately 1.4 Å.

In ^{1}H-NMR spectroscopy, protons of a phenyl group typically have chemical shifts around 7.27 ppm. These chemical shifts are influenced by aromatic ring current and may change depending on substituents.

== Preparation, occurrence, and applications ==
Phenyl groups are usually introduced using reagents that behave as sources of the phenyl anion or the phenyl cation. Representative reagents include phenyllithium (C_{6}H_{5}Li) and phenylmagnesium bromide (C_{6}H_{5}MgBr). Electrophiles are attacked by benzene to give phenyl derivatives:

$$\ce{C6H6 + E+ -> C6H5E + H+}$$

where E^{+} (the "electrophile") = Cl^{+}, NO^{+}_{2}, SO_{3}. These reactions are called electrophilic aromatic substitutions.

Representative compounds containing phenyl groups

Atorvastatin (Lipitor), a blockbuster drug featuring two phenyl and one p-fluorophenyl groups. It is used to lower cholesterol in people with hypercholesterolaemia.

Fexofenadine (Allegra, Telfast), another blockbuster drug, which features a diphenylmethyl group as well as a p-phenylene (C_{6}H_{4}) group. It is an antihistamine used to treat allergies.

Phenylalanine, a common amino acid.

Biphenyl, consisting of two phenyl groups. The two rings tend not to be coplanar.

Chlorobenzene (or phenyl chloride), a solvent.

Phenyl groups are found in many organic compounds, both natural and synthetic (see figure). Most common among natural products is the amino acid phenylalanine, which contains a phenyl group. A major product of the petrochemical industry is "BTX" consisting of benzene, toluene, and xylene - all of which are building blocks for phenyl compounds. The polymer polystyrene is derived from a phenyl-containing monomer and owes its properties to the rigidity and hydrophobicity of the phenyl groups. Many drugs as well as many pollutants contain phenyl rings. One of the simplest phenyl-containing compounds is phenol, C_{6}H_{5}OH. It is often said the resonance stability of phenol makes it a stronger acid than that of aliphatic alcohols such as ethanol (pK_{a} = 10 vs. 16–18). However, a significant contribution is the greater electronegativity of the sp^{2} alpha carbon in phenol compared to the sp^{3} alpha carbon in aliphatic alcohols.
