= Metallofullerene =

Class of chemical compounds

In chemistry, a metallofullerene is a molecule composed of a metal atom trapped inside a fullerene cage.

Simple metallofullerenes consist of a fullerene cage, typically C_{80}, with one or two metal atoms trapped inside. Recently, research has produced metallofullerenes that enclose small clusters of atoms, such as Sc_{3}N@C_{80}, Y_{3}N@C_{80}, and Sc_{3}C_{2}@C_{80}. The '@' symbol in the formula indicates that the atom(s) are encapsulated inside the cage, rather than being chemically bonded to it.

Fullerenes in a variety of sizes have been found to encapsulate metal atoms in this way.

== Medical applications ==
One particular metallofullerene with gadolinium at its core is up to 40 times better as a contrast agent in magnetic resonance imaging scans for diagnostic imaging. Metallofullerenes may also provide ways to carry therapeutic radioactive ions to cancerous tissue.

== See also ==
- Endohedral fullerene
