= 3,3-Dimethylhexane =

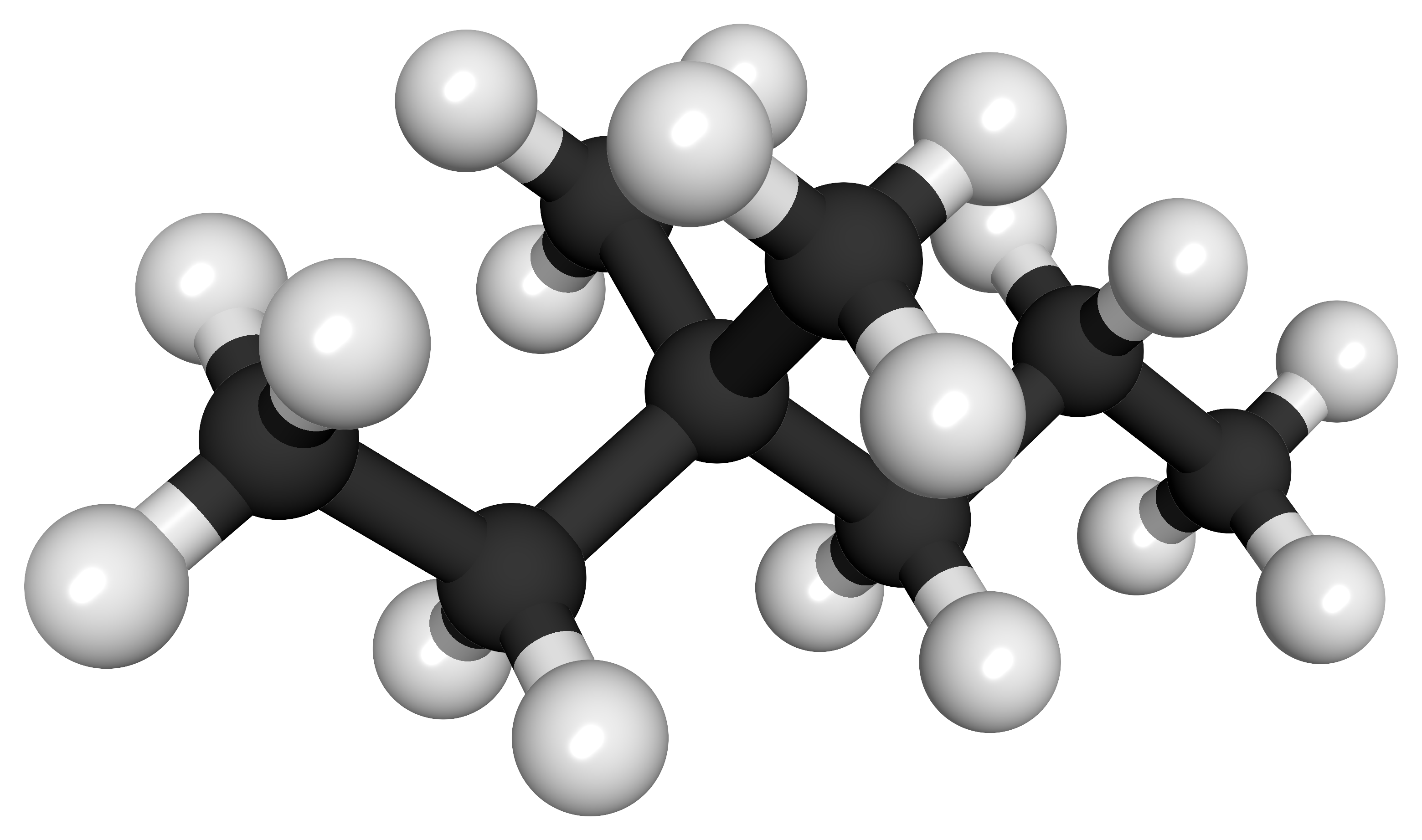

Names
- Preferred IUPAC name 3,3-Dimethylhexane

Identifiers
CAS Number	563-16-6
3D model (JSmol)	Interactive image
ChEBI	CHEBI:132182
ChemSpider	10759
ECHA InfoCard	100.008.404
EC Number	209-243-9
PubChem CID	11233
UNII	J62AAG7FN0
UN number	1262
CompTox Dashboard (EPA)	DTXSID2073194
- InChI: InChI=1S/C8H18/c1-5-7-8(3,4)6-2/h5-7H2,1-4H3 Key: KUMXLFIBWFCMOJ-UHFFFAOYSA-N
- SMILES: CCCC(C)(C)CC

Properties
Chemical formula	C_{8}H_{18}
Molar mass	114.232 g·mol^{−1}
Appearance	Colourless liquid
Odor	Odourless
Melting point	−126.10 °C; −194.98 °F; 147.05 K
Boiling point	111.90 °C; 233.42 °F; 385.05 K

Hazards
- GHS labelling
Pictograms	(GHS02: Flammable) (GHS07: Exclamation mark) (GHS08: Health hazard) (GHS09: Environmental hazard)
Signal word	Danger
Hazard statements	H225, H304, H315, H336, H410
Precautionary statements	P210, P261, P273, P301+P310, P331
Flash point	7 °C (45 °F; 280 K)
Autoignition temperature	425 °C (797 °F; 698 K)

Related compounds
Related alkanes	2,2-Dimethylbutane; 2,3-Dimethylbutane 2,3,3-Trimethylpentane; Triptane; Tetramethylbutane; Tetraethylmethane; 2,2,4-Trimethylpentane; 2,3,4-Trimethylpentane; Tetra-tert-butylmethane; 2,3-Dimethylhexane; 2,5-Dimethylhexane
- Except where otherwise noted, data are given for materials in their standard state (at 25 °C [77 °F], 100 kPa). Infobox references

3,3-Dimethylhexane is a colourless, odourless liquid, chemical compound in the family of hydrocarbons which has a formula of C_{8}H_{18}. It is an isomer of octane, where two methylene hydrogens at the third position in a hexane molecule have been replaced with two methyl groups.

3,3-Dimethylhexane is found in various herbs and spices. It is also a constituent in the oil of osmanthus fragrans and Ginseng. 3,3-Dimethylhexane is an acyclic alkane, where there are no cycles in the structure of the molecule.

It is one of the main extracts from cinnamon bark using supercritical carbon dioxide extraction, with it being 10.6% of the extracted material; it is second behind trans-cinnamaldehyde with it being 32.1% of the extracted material.

== Uses ==
3,3-dimethylhexane can be used in the production of phytochemical compounds which are effective in the removal of heavy metals, since when cyanobacteria are exposed to aliphatic compounds, or alkanes, and some heavy metals they produce phytochemical compounds which are effective in the removal of heavy metals. 3,3-dimethylhexane being both an alkane and an aliphatic compound can be used in this process.
