= C8H18 =

The molecular formula C_{8}H_{18} (molar mass: 114.23 g/mol) may refer to:

- Octane (n-octane)
- 2-Methylheptane
- 3-Methylheptane
- 4-Methylheptane
- 3-Ethylhexane
- 2,2-Dimethylhexane
- 2,3-Dimethylhexane
- 2,4-Dimethylhexane
- 2,5-Dimethylhexane
- 3,3-Dimethylhexane
- 3,4-Dimethylhexane
- 3-Ethyl-2-methylpentane
- 3-Ethyl-3-methylpentane
- 2,2,3-Trimethylpentane
- 2,2,4-Trimethylpentane (isooctane)
- 2,3,3-Trimethylpentane
- 2,3,4-Trimethylpentane
- 2,2,3,3-Tetramethylbutane
