= Dimethylhexane =

Set index of six octane isomers

Dimethylhexane may refer to any of six constitutional isomers of octane, all of which have the molecular formula C_{8}H_{18}:

- 2,2-Dimethylhexane
- 2,3-Dimethylhexane
- 2,4-Dimethylhexane
- 2,5-Dimethylhexane
- 3,3-Dimethylhexane
- 3,4-Dimethylhexane
