= Octane rating =

Standard measure of the performance of an engine or aviation fuel

An octane rating, or octane number, is a standard measure of a fuel's ability to withstand compression in an internal combustion engine without causing engine knocking. The higher the octane number, the more compression the fuel can withstand before auto-igniting. The term refers to the equivalent ratio of a blend of iso-octane and heptane that produces the same knocking characteristics. Octane rating does not relate directly to the power output or the energy content of the fuel per unit mass or volume, but simply indicates the resistance to auto-ignition under pressure without a spark.

Whether a higher octane fuel improves or impairs an engine's performance depends on the design of the engine. In broad terms, fuels with a higher octane rating are used in higher-compression gasoline engines, which may yield higher power for these engines. The added power in such cases comes from the way the engine is designed to compress the air/fuel mixture, and not directly from the rating of the gasoline.

In contrast, fuels with lower octane (but higher cetane numbers) are ideal for diesel engines because diesel engines (also called compression-ignition engines) do not compress the fuel, but rather compress only air, and then inject fuel into the air that was heated by compression. Gasoline engines rely on ignition of compressed air and fuel mixture, which is ignited only near the end of the compression stroke by electric spark plugs. Therefore, being able to compress the air/fuel mixture without causing detonation is important mainly for gasoline engines. Using gasoline with lower octane than an engine is built for may cause engine knocking and/or pre-ignition.

The octane rating of aviation gasoline was extremely important in determining aero engine performance in the aircraft of World War II. The octane rating affected not only the performance of the gasoline, but also its versatility; the higher octane fuel allowed a wider range of lean to rich operating conditions.

== Principles ==
=== Knocking ===
In spark ignition internal combustion engines, knocking (also knock, detonation, spark knock, pinging, or pinking) occurs when combustion of some of the air/fuel mixture in the cylinder does not result from propagation of the flame front ignited by the spark plug, but when one or more pockets of air/fuel mixture explode outside the envelope of the normal combustion front. The fuel-air charge is meant to be ignited by the spark plug only, and at a precise point in the piston's stroke. Knock occurs when the peak of the combustion process no longer occurs at the optimum moment for the four-stroke cycle. In a simple explanation, the forward moving wave of combustion that burns the hydrocarbon + oxygen mixture inside the cylinder like a wave that a surfer would wish to surf upon is violently disrupted by a secondary wave that has started elsewhere. The shock wave of these two separate waves creates the characteristic metallic "pinging" sound, and cylinder pressure increases dramatically. Effects of engine knocking range from inconsequential (incremental heating plus power loss) to completely destructive (detonation while one of the valves is still open).

Knocking should not be confused with pre-ignition – they are two separate events with pre-ignition occurring before the combustion event. However, pre-ignition is highly correlated with knock because knock will cause rapid heat increase within the cylinder eventually leading to destructive pre-detonation.

Most engine management systems commonly found in automobiles today, typically electronic fuel injection (EFI), have a knock sensor that monitors if knock is being produced by the fuel being used. In modern computer-controlled engines, the ignition timing will be automatically altered by the engine management system to reduce the knock to an acceptable level.

=== Iso-octane as a reference standard ===
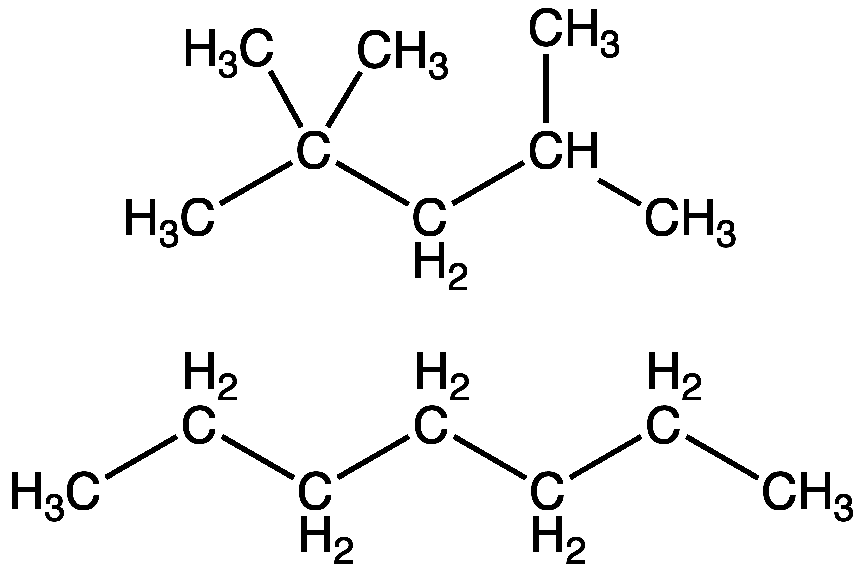
2,2,4-Trimethylpentane (iso-octane) (upper) by definition is assigned the octane rating of 100, whereas n-heptane (lower) is assigned the octane rating of 0.

Octanes are a family of hydrocarbons that are typical components of gasoline. They are colorless liquids that boil around 125 °C (260 °F). One member of the octane family, 2,2,4-Trimethylpentane (iso-octane), is used as a reference standard to benchmark the tendency of gasoline or LPG fuels to resist self-ignition.

The octane rating of gasoline is measured in a test engine and is defined by comparison with the mixture of 2,2,4-trimethylpentane (iso-octane) and normal heptane that would have the same anti-knocking capability as the fuel under test. The percentage, by volume, of 2,2,4-trimethylpentane in that mixture is the octane number of the fuel. For example, gasoline with the same knocking characteristics as a mixture of 90% iso-octane and 10% heptane would have an octane rating of 90. A rating of 90 does not mean that the gasoline contains just iso-octane and heptane in these proportions, but that it has the same detonation resistance properties (generally, gasoline sold for common use never consists solely of iso-octane and heptane; it is a mixture of many hydrocarbons and often other additives).

Octane ratings are not indicators of the energy content of fuels. (See Effects below and Heat of combustion). They are only a measure of the fuel's tendency to burn in a controlled manner, rather than exploding in an uncontrolled manner.

Where the octane number is raised by blending in ethanol, energy content per volume is reduced. Ethanol energy density can be compared with gasoline in heat-of-combustion tables.

Gasoline additives exist that can be added in small quantities to raise the octane rating. It is possible for a fuel to have a Research Octane Number (RON) greater than 100 which is known as a performance number. Racing fuels, avgas (aviation gasoline), LPG and alcohol fuels such as methanol may have performance numbers of 110 or significantly higher. Typical "octane booster" gasoline additives include MTBE, ETBE, toluene and iso-octane itself. Lead in the form of tetraethyllead was once a common additive, but concerns about its toxicity have led to its use for fuels for road vehicles being progressively phased out worldwide beginning in the 1970s.

== Measurement methods ==
=== Research Octane Number (RON) ===
The most common type of octane rating worldwide is the Research Octane Number (RON). RON is determined by running the fuel in a test engine at 600 rpm with a variable compression ratio under controlled conditions, and comparing the results with those for mixtures of iso-octane and n-heptane. The compression ratio is varied during the test to challenge the fuel's anti-knocking tendency, as an increase in the compression ratio will increase the chances of knocking.

=== Motor Octane Number (MON) ===
Another type of octane rating, called Motor Octane Number (MON), is determined at 900 rpm engine speed instead of the 600 rpm for RON. MON testing uses a similar test engine to that used in RON testing, but with a preheated fuel mixture, higher engine speed, and variable ignition timing to further stress the fuel's knock resistance. Depending on the composition of the fuel, the MON of a modern pump gasoline will be about 8 to 12 lower than the RON, but there is no direct link between RON and MON. See the table below.

=== Anti-Knock Index (AKI) or (R+M)/2 ===
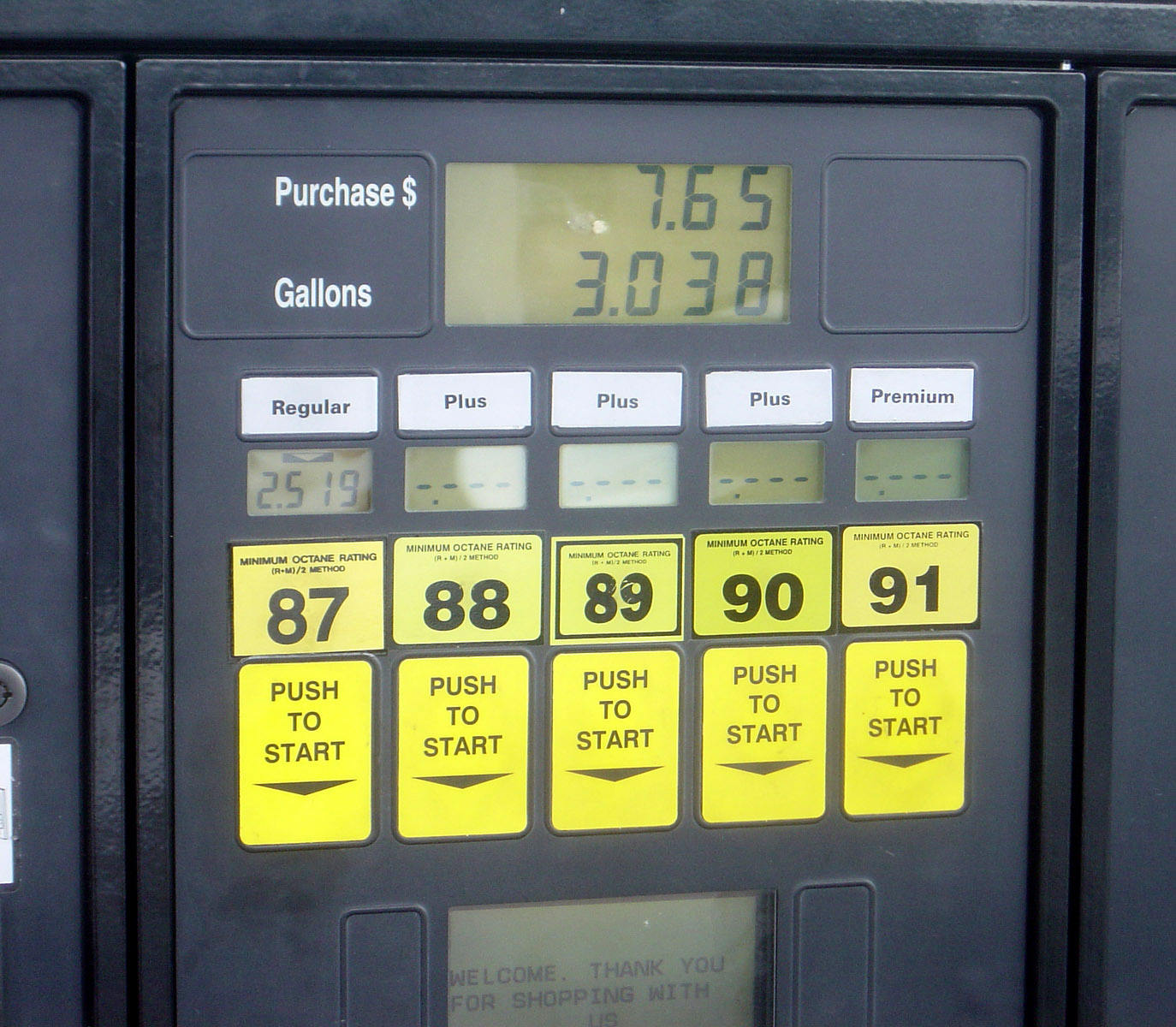
A US gasoline pump offering five different octane ratings

In Canada, The United States, and Mexico, the advertised octane rating is the average of the RON and the MON, called the Anti-Knock Index (AKI). It is often written on pumps as (R+M)/2. AKI is also sometimes called PON (Pump Octane Number).

=== Difference between RON, MON, and AKI ===
Because of the 8 to 12 octane number difference between RON and MON noted above, the AKI shown in Canada and the United States is 4 to 6 octane numbers lower than elsewhere in the world for the same fuel. This difference between RON and MON is known as the fuel's sensitivity, and is not typically published for those countries that use the Anti-Knock Index labelling system.

See the table in the following section for a comparison.

=== Observed Road Octane Number (RdON) ===
Another type of octane rating, called Observed Road Octane Number (RdON), is derived from testing the gasoline in ordinary multi-cylinder engines (rather than in a purpose-built test engine), normally at wide open throttle. This type of test was developed in the 1920s and is still reliable today. The original RdON tests were done in cars on the road, but as technology developed the testing was moved to chassis dynamometers with environmental controls to improve consistency.

=== Octane Index ===
The evaluation of the octane number by either of the two laboratory methods requires a special engine built to match the tests' rigid standards, and the procedure can be both expensive and time-consuming. The standard engine required for the test may not always be available, especially in out-of-the-way places or in small or mobile laboratories. These and other considerations led to the search for a rapid method for the evaluation of the anti-knock quality of gasoline. Such substitute methods include FTIR, near infrared on-line analyzers, and others. Deriving an equation that can be used to calculate ratings accurately enough would also serve the same purpose, with added advantages. The term Octane Index is often used to refer to the use of an equation to determine a theoretical rating, in contradistinction to the direct measurements required for research or motor octane numbers. An octane index can be of great service in the blending of gasoline. Motor gasoline, as marketed, is usually a blend of several types of refinery grades that are derived from different processes such as straight-run gasoline, reformate, cracked gasoline etc. These different grades are blended in amounts that will meet final product specifications. Most refiners produce and market more than one grade of motor gasoline, differing principally in their anti-knock quality. Being able to make sufficiently accurate estimates of the octane rating that will result from blending different refinery products is essential, something for which the calculated octane index is specially suited.

=== Aviation gasoline octane ratings ===
Aviation gasolines used in piston aircraft engines common in general aviation have a slightly different method of measuring the octane of the fuel. Similar to an AKI, it has two different ratings, although it is usually referred to only by the lower of the two. One is referred to as the "aviation lean" rating, which for ratings up to 100 is the same as the MON of the fuel. The second is the "aviation rich" rating and corresponds to the octane rating of a test engine under forced induction operation common in high-performance and military piston aircraft. This utilizes a supercharger, and uses a significantly richer fuel/air ratio for improved detonation resistance.

The most common currently used fuel, 100LL, has an aviation lean rating of 100 octane, and an aviation rich rating of 130.

== Examples ==
The RON/MON values of n-heptane and iso-octane are exactly 0 and 100, respectively, by the definition of octane rating. The following table lists octane ratings for various other fuels.

Fuel	RON	MON	AKI or (R+M)/2
hexadecane	−30 (maximum)		
n-octane	−20	−17	−18.5
n-heptane (RON and MON 0 by definition)	0	0	0
diesel fuel	15–25		
2-methylheptane	23	23.8	23
n-hexane	25	26.0	26
1-pentene	34		
2-methylhexane	44	46.4	45.2
3-methylhexane		55.0	
1-heptene	60		
n-pentane	62	61.9	62
requirement for a typical two-stroke outboard motor	69	65	67
Pertamina "Premium" in Indonesia (discontinued)	88	78	83
Pertamina "Pertalite" and Vivo "Revvo 90" in Indonesia (will begin discontinuing sales in 2024)	90		
"Plus 91" (Regular) in Costa Rica	91	79	85
"Súper" (Premium) in Costa Rica	95	83	89
"E15" (Unleaded 88) in United States	95	81	88
"Regular gasoline" in Japan	90		
n-butanol	92	71	83
Neopentane (dimethylpropane)		80.2	
n-butane	94	90.1	92
Isopentane (methylbutane)		90.3	
"Regular Gasoline/Petroleum" in Australia, New Zealand, Canada and the United States	91–92	82–83	87
Pertamina "Pertamax 92" in Indonesia	92	82	87
"АИ-92-К5" in Russia	92	83	87.5
"Shell Super" in Indonesia, "Total Performance 92" in Indonesia, "Vivo Revvo 92" in Indonesia, "BP 92" in Indonesia	92		
2,2-dimethylbutane		93.4	
2,3-dimethylbutane		94.4	
"Mid-Grade Gasoline" in the United States and Canada	94–95	84–85	89–90
"YPF Super" and "Shell Formula Super" in Argentina	95	84	89–90
"Axion Super" in Argentina	95	83	89
"Super/Premium" in New Zealand and Australia	95	85	90
"Aral Super 95" in Germany, "Aral Super 95 E10" (10% ethanol) in Germany	95	85	90
"АИ-95-К5" in Russia	95	85	90
"Shell V-Power" in Indonesia, "Vivo Revvo 95" in Indonesia, "Bp Ultimate" in Indonesia, Pertamina "Pertamax Green" in Indonesia, "Shell FuelSave " in Malaysia	95		
"EuroSuper" or "EuroPremium" or "Regular unleaded" in UK/Europe, "SP95" and "SP95-E10" (10% ethanol blend) in France, "Super 95" in Belgium "Verde" in Italy (SP95 5% ethanol blend)	95	85–86	90–91
"Premium" or "Super unleaded" gasoline in US and Canada (10% ethanol blend)	97	87–88	92–93
"Shell V-Power 97" in Malaysia and Chile	97		
"Shell V-Power Racing" in Malaysia and Singapore	98		
"Premium Gasoline" in the United States	96–98	86–88	91–93
"IES 98 Plus" in Italy, "Aral SuperPlus 98" in Germany, Pertamina "Pertamax Turbo" in Indonesia, Premium unleaded in the UK	98		
"YPF Infinia" and "Shell V-Power" in Argentina	98	85	91–92
"Axion Quantium" in Argentina	98	88	93
"Corriente (Regular)" in Colombia	91.5	70	81
"Extra (Super/Plus)" in Colombia	95	79	87
"SuperPlus" in Germany	98	88	93
"АИ-98-К5" in Russia	98	88	93
"Shell V-Power 98", "Caltex Platinum 98 with Techron", "Esso Mobil Synergy 8000" and "SPC LEVO 98" in Singapore, "BP Ultimate 98/Mobil Synergy 8000" in New Zealand, "SP98" in France, "Super 98" in Belgium, Great Britain, Slovenia and Spain, "Ampol Amplify 98 Unleaded" in Australia	98	89–90	93–94
"Shell V-Power Nitro+ 99" "Tesco Momentum 99" In the United Kingdom	99	87	93
Pertamina "Pertamina Racing Fuel" (bioethanol blend) in Indonesia	100	86	93
"Premium" gasoline in Japan, "IP Plus 100" in Italy, "Tamoil WR 100" in Italy, "Shell V-Power Racing" in Australia – discontinued July 2008, "NPD 100Plus" in New Zealand	100	89	94.5
"Shell V-Power" in Italy and Germany	100	88	94
"Eni (or Agip) Blu Super +(or Tech)" in Italy	100	87	94
iso-octane (RON and MON 100 by definition)	100	100	100
"Petron Blaze 100 Euro 4M/Euro 6" in Philippines and Malaysia	100		
"San Marco Petroli F-101" in Italy (northern Italy only, just a few gas stations)	100.1	85	92.55
benzene	101		
2,5-Dimethylfuran	101.3	88.1	94.7
Petro-Canada "Ultra 94" in Canada	101.5	88	94
Aral Ultimate 102 in Germany	102	88	95
Gulf Endurance 102 Racing Fuel (sold only at Silverstone Circuit in the United Kingdom)	102	93–94	97–98
ExxonMobil Avgas 100LL		99.6 (minimum)	
HD Hyundai Oilbank ULTRA KAZEN in South Korea	102 (minimum)		
Petrobras Podium in Brazil	102	88	97
E85 gasoline	102–105	85–87	94–96
i-butane	102	97.6	100
"BP Ultimate 102" – now discontinued	102	93–94	97–98
t-butanol	103	91	97
2,3,3-trimethylpentane	106.1	99.4	103
ethane	108		
ethanol	108.6	89.7	99.15
methanol	108.7	88.6	98.65
2,2,3-trimethylpentane	109.6	99.9	105
propane	112	97	105
ethylbenzene	112	99	106
isopropylbenzene (cumene)	112	102	107
2,2,3-trimethylbutane	112.1	101.3	106
VP C16 Race Fuel	117	118	117.5
propan-2-ol	118	98	108
propan-1-ol	118	98	108
xylene	118	115	116.5
methane	120	120	120
toluene	121	107	114
hydrogen	130 (minimum)	60	95

== Effects ==
Higher octane ratings correlate to higher activation energies: the amount of applied energy required to initiate combustion. Since higher octane fuels have higher activation energy requirements, it is less likely that a given compression will cause uncontrolled ignition, otherwise known as autoignition, self-ignition, pre-ignition, detonation, or knocking.

Because octane is a measured and/or calculated rating of the fuel's ability to resist autoignition, the higher the octane of the fuel, the harder that fuel is to ignite and the more heat is required to ignite it. The result is that a hotter ignition spark is required for ignition. Creating a hotter spark requires more energy from the ignition system, which in turn increases the parasitic electrical load on the engine. The spark also must begin earlier in order to generate sufficient heat at the proper time for precise ignition. As octane, ignition spark energy, and the need for precise timing increase, the engine becomes more difficult to tune and keep in tune. The resulting sub-optimal spark energy and timing can cause major engine problems, from a simple misfire to uncontrolled detonation and catastrophic engine failure.

Mechanically within the cylinder, stability can be visualized as having a flame wave initiate at the spark plug and then travel in a fairly uniform manner across the combustion chamber with the expanding gas mix pushing the piston throughout the entirety of the power stroke. A stable gasoline and air mix will combust when the flame wave reaches the molecules, adding heat at the interface. Knock occurs when a secondary flame wave forms from instability and then travels against the path of the primary flame wave, thus depriving the power stroke of its uniformity and causing issues including power loss and heat buildup.

The other rarely-discussed reality with high-octane fuels associated with "high performance" engines is that as octane increases, the specific gravity and energy content of the fuel per unit of weight are reduced. The net result is that to make a given amount of power, more high-octane fuel must be burned in the engine. Lighter and thinner fuel also has a lower specific heat, so the practice of cooling the engine by means of running a rich fuel to air ratio requires an ever-increasing amount of fuel as octane increases.

Thinner high-octane fuels often contain alcohol compounds, making them hygroscopic and incompatible with older fuel system components. They also evaporate away much more easily than heavier, lower-octane fuels which leads to more accumulated contaminants in the fuel system. Additionally, components of the fuel - particularly alkenes and oxygenates - will slowly polymerize into gum-like solids colloquially referred to as varnish.

During the compression stroke of an internal combustion engine, the temperature of the air-fuel mix rises as it is compressed, in accordance with the ideal gas law. Higher compression ratios necessarily add parasitic load to the engine, and are only necessary if the engine is being specifically designed to run on high-octane fuel. Aircraft engines run at relatively low speeds and are undersquare. They run best on lower-octane, slower-burning fuels that require less heat and a lower compression ratio for optimum vaporization and uniform fuel-air mixing, with the ignition spark coming as late as possible in order to extend the production of cylinder pressure and torque as far down the power stroke as possible. The main reason for using high-octane fuel in air-cooled engines is that it is more easily vaporized in a cold carburetor and engine and absorbs less intake air heat which greatly reduces the tendency for carburetor icing to occur.

With their reduced densities and weight per volume of fuel, the other obvious benefit is that an aircraft with any given volume of fuel in the tanks is automatically lighter. Since many airplanes are flown only occasionally and may sit unused for weeks or months, the lighter fuels tend to evaporate away and leave behind fewer deposits. Aircraft also typically have redundant ignition systems which are nearly impossible to synchronize, so using a lighter fuel that is less prone to auto-ignition acts as a safety net. For the same reasons, those lighter fuels which are better solvents are much less likely to cause any varnish or other fouling on the backup spark plugs.

In almost all general aviation piston engines, the fuel mixture is directly controlled by the pilot, via a knob and cable or lever similar to (and next to) the throttle control. Leaning – reducing the mixture from its maximum amount – must be done with knowledge, as some combinations of fuel mixture and throttle position (that produce the highest) can cause detonation and/or pre-ignition, in the worst case destroying the engine within seconds. Pilots are taught in primary training to avoid settings that produce the highest exhaust gas temperatures, and run the engine either "rich of peak EGT" (more fuel than can be burned with the available air) or "lean of peak" (less fuel, leaving some oxygen in the exhaust) as either will keep the fuel-air mixture from detonating prematurely. Because of the high cost of unleaded, high-octane avgas, and possible increased range before refueling, some general aviation pilots attempt to save money by tuning their fuel-air mixtures and ignition timing to run "lean of peak". Additionally, the decreased air density at higher altitudes (such as Colorado) and temperatures (as in summer) requires leaning (reduction in amount of fuel per volume or mass of air) for the peak EGT and power (crucial for takeoff).

== Regional variations ==
The selection of octane ratings available at filling stations can vary greatly between countries.

- Australia: "regular" unleaded fuel is 91 RON, "premium" unleaded with 95 RON is widely available, and 98 RON fuel is also very common. Shell used to sell 100 RON fuel (5% ethanol content) from a small number of service stations, most of which are located in major cities (stopped in August 2008). United Petroleum used to sell 100 RON unleaded fuel (10% ethanol content) at a small number of its service stations (originally only two, but then expanded to 67 outlets nationwide) (stopped in September 2014). All fuel in Australia is unleaded except for some aviation fuels. E85 unleaded fuel is also available at several United service stations across the country. By 2018, E10 fuel had become quite common, and is available at almost every major fuel station, except in Western Australia.
- Bahrain: 91 and 95 (RON), standard in all gasoline stations in the country and advertised as (Jayyid) for Regular or 91 and (Mumtaz) for Premium or 95 and 98 (RON) as super.
- Bangladesh: Two types of fuel are available at petrol stations in Bangladesh. Motor Gasoline Regular (marketed as "Petrol") which has RON 80 rating, and Motor Gasoline Premium (marketed as "Octane") which has RON 95 rating. Petrol stations in Bangladesh are privatised, but the prices are regulated by the authorities and have a fixed price at BDT 86.00 (US$1.04) and BDT 89.00 (US$1.07) (as of 1 March 2018) per litre respectively.
- Botswana: 93 and 95 RON are standard at almost all gas stations throughout Botswana. The two types are unleaded.
- Brazil: As defined by federal law, the RON standard is used and all types of gasoline sold in all gas stations throughout the country are unleaded (the latter since 1991). By default, it was defined by the federal government that the regular (and the lowest) octane standard in Brazil is 93 RON, known in Portuguese as Gasolina Comum (English: "Common Gasoline") – Petrobras stations brand it as Gasolina Regular (English: "Regular Gasoline"). This type of gasoline can be found in most Brazilian petrol stations and does not have any additives, except the inclusion of 27,5% of ethanol (as required by the Brazilian National Agency of Petroleum, Natural Gas and Biofuels – Portuguese: Agência Nacional do Petróleo, Gás Natural e Biocombustíveis or simply ANP – since 2011). Along with the "Common" gasoline, there is a second type of gasoline that can also be found in most stations in Brazil. This gasoline is also mixed with 27,5% of ethanol (to comply with the ANP regulation, that prohibits the sale of the 100% "pure gasoline" compound in all Brazilian stations), but a few detergent and dispersant additives are also included in the compound. This type of gasoline is known in Portuguese as Gasolina Aditivada (English: "Additived Gasoline") – Petrobras stations brand it as "Petrobras Grid"; nevertheless, the octane rating is also 93 RON (these additives are used to improve the performance and efficiency of the engine, but they are not indicative of a higher octane rating). However, higher octane levels of gasoline are found in many stations (all stations in Brazil, regardless of the octane rating, have to conform the ANP requirement of 27,5% of ethanol mixed with the gasoline, and both "Common" and "Additived" gasolines can also be found in most of these stations), such as the "Premium Gasoline" (known in Portuguese as Gasolina Premium – 98 RON), the "OctaPro" (103 RON), sold at Ipiranga stations, and the "Petrobras Podium" (102 RON), sold at Petrobras stations.
- Canada: in Canada octane rating is displayed in AKI. In most areas, the standard grades are 87 (regular), 89 (mid-grade) and 91–94 (premium) AKI. In the Atlantic Provinces, gasoline is often available without any blend of ethanol, but only up to 91 AKI.
- China: From January 1, 2000, all fuel stations offer unleaded fuel only. Now, 92 RON and 95 RON (previously 90 RON, 93 RON and 97 RON) are commonly offered. Some state-run gas stations (Sinopec, PetroChina) in various cities sell 98 RON, but not all. Private gas stations outside of China's Shandong province rarely offer 98 RON. In most rural areas it can be difficult to find fuel with over 95 RON. In backward provinces and regions, only ethanol gasoline containing 10% ethanol is allowed to be sold: 92E10, 95E10 and 98E10, Some gas pumps use the labels "E92, E95 and E98", but they still represent E10 ethanol gasoline of 92 RON, 95 RON and 98 RON. Sinopec's 98 RON gasoline is called "X-power 98" (爱跑98), and PetroChina's 98 RON gasoline is called "CN98", both “X-power 98” and “CN 98” gasoline are formulated with fuel detergents, comparable to America's Top Tier gasoline standard. China's National VI gasoline standard has completely banned the use of metal anti-knock agents, because metal anti-knock agents such as MMT and ferrocene will clog the car's GPF, but gasoline vehicles that meet the National VI B emission standards must install GPF.
- Chile: 93, 95 and 97 RON are standard at almost all gas stations thorough Chile. The three types are unleaded.
- Colombia: "Ecopetrol", Colombia's monopoly of refining and distribution of gasoline establishes a minimum AKI of 81 octanes for "Corriente" gasoline and minimum AKI of 87 octanes for "Extra" gasoline. (91.5 RON corriente, and 95 RON for extra)
- Costa Rica: RECOPE, Costa Rica's distribution monopoly, establishes the following ratings: Plus 91 (at least 91 RON) and Super (at least 95 RON).
- Croatia: All fuel stations offer unleaded "Eurosuper BS" (abbreviation "BS" meaning "no sulfur content") 95 RON fuel, many also offer "Eurosuper Plus BS" 98 RON. Some companies offer 100 RON fuel instead of 98.
- Cyprus: All fuel stations offer unleaded 95 and 98 RON, and a few offer 100 RON as well.
- Denmark: 95 RON is a common budget choice, with 95 and 98 being widely available, and 92 rarely seen as it has been phased out during the 2010s. A selection of brands offers >=100 options, under trademarked names. However several fuel stations are phasing out 92 RON. By law, it is decided that all gasoline companies from July 2010 to January 2020 should use a mix containing 5% bioethanol in the gasoline and increased to 10% after January 2020.
- Ecuador: "Extra" and Ecopais (5% etanol) with 85 RON, "Eco Plus" with 89 RON and "Super Premium" with 95 (RON). Extra/Ecopais and Super Premium are available in all fuel stations. "Extra" is the most commonly used. All fuels are unleaded.
- Egypt: Egyptian fuel stations had 90 RON until July 2014 when the government found no remaining use for it, leaving only 92 RON and 95 RON. 80 RON is found in a very limited number of fuel stations as they are used only for extremely old cars that cannot cope with high octane fuel. 95 RON was used limitedly due to its high price (more than twice the price of 92 RON). But after the increasing the prices again in 2018, 95 RON price became only 15% higher than 92 RON, so it started to gain popularity.
- Estonia: 95 RON and 98 RON are widely available. E85 (bioethanol) gasoline found in very few gas stations.
- Finland: 95 and 98 (RON), advertised as such, at almost all gas stations. Most cars run on 95, but 98 is available for vehicles that need higher octane fuel, or older models containing parts easily damaged by high ethanol content. Shell offers V-Power, advertised as "over 99 octane", instead of 98. In the beginning of 2011 95 RON was replaced by 95E10 containing 10% ethanol, and 98 RON by 98E5, containing 5% ethanol. ST1 also offers RE85 on some stations, which is 85% ethanol made from biodegradable waste (from which the advertised name "ReFuel" comes). RE85 is only suitable for flexifuel cars that can run on high-percentage ethanol.
- Germany: "Super E5 and E10" 95 RON and "Super Plus E5" 98 RON are available practically everywhere. Big suppliers such as Shell or Aral offer 100 RON gasoline (Shell V-Power, Aral Ultimate) at almost every fuel station. "Normal" 91 RON is only rarely offered because lower production amounts make it more expensive than "Super" 95 RON. Due to a new European Union law, gas stations are being required to offer a minimum rate of the new mixture of "Super" 95 RON with up to 10% ethanol branded as "Super E10".
- Greece (Hellas): 95 RON (standard unleaded), 98 & 100 RON unleaded offered by some companies (e.g., EKO, Shell, BP).
- Hong Kong: only 98 RON is available in the market. There have been calls to re-introduce 95 RON, but the calls have been rejected by all automotive fuel station chains, citing that 95 RON was phased out because of market forces.
- India: India's ordinary and premium petrol options are of 91 RON. The premium petrols are generally ordinary fuels with additives, that do not really change the octane value. Two variants, "Speed 93" and "Speed 97", were launched, with RON values of 93 and 97. In 2017, Hindustan Petroleum launched poWer 99 with an RON value of 99 which was initially available only in Bangalore, Pune and now in Mumbai but was expected to roll out in other major cities soon. India's economy-class vehicles usually have compression ratios under 10:1, thus enabling them to use lower-octane petrol without engine knocking.
- Indonesia: Indonesia's "Premium" gasoline, rated at 88 RON, was the lowest grade gasoline, but was phased out by 2021. Other options have been "Pertalite", rated at 90 RON; "Pertamax", rated at 92 RON; "Pertamax Plus", rated at 95 RON (now replaced by Pertamax Green in July 2023); and "Pertamax Racing", a 100 RON fuel sold in selected stations. From August 2016, Pertamina began selling "Pertamax Turbo", rated at 98 RON, as a replacement for Pertamax Plus. Total and Shell stations only sell RON 92 and 95 gasoline. Shell launched a new variant, "Regular", rated at 90 RON, in early 2018, but this was discontinued in January 2022. However, after 6 years of discontinuation of Pertamax Plus, In July 2023 Pertamina launched the Pertamax Green 95 which made of sugarcane and a mixture of Pertamax 92 and the price is slightly cheaper than Pertamax Turbo which rated 98 RON.
- Iran: 'regular' gasoline has an octane rating of 87 RON, which is the most prevalent type of gasoline available throughout the country. Select gas stations within major cities also offer 'Super' 95 RON. Due to high air pollution, an environmentally cleaner variety, marketed as Euro-4, is being introduced in metropolitan areas instead of the Regular, which has an octane rating of 91 RON and sulphur levels not exceeding 50 ppm.
- Ireland: 95 RON "unleaded" is the only gasoline type available through stations.
- Italy: 95 RON is the only compulsory gasoline offered (verde, "green"), only a few fuel stations (Agip, IP, IES, OMV) offer 98 RON as the premium type, many Shell and Tamoil stations close to the cities offer also V-Power Gasoline rated at 100 RON. Recently Agip introduced "Blu Super+", a 100 RON gasoline.
- Israel: 95 RON & 98 RON are normally available at most automotive fuel stations. 96 RON is no longer available as of 2010. 95 RON is preferred because it is cheaper and performance differences are not significant. "Regular" fuel is 95 RON. All variants are unleaded.
- Japan: "Regular" unleaded fuel is 90 RON and "High-octane" ("Premium") fuel is about 100 RON, or in fact 99.5 RON according to some suppliers, at least until around 2021. The minimum values are defined in standard JIS K 2202: "Regular" is >=89.0 RON, and "High-octane" is >=96.0 RON, since the revision of 1986. It means "High-octane" has a higher octane rating than the JIS standard. Although 99.5 RON is not defined, there is no significant difference in "High-octane" from different suppliers according to the president of the Petroleum Association of Japan, and it is believed that each has almost the same octane rating (99.5 RON) in spite of the JIS. But the actual octane rating is not clear and it can be sold as "High-octane" as long as it is 96.0 RON or more. "High-octane" was formerly sometimes advertised as "Octane 100", but this practice was abandoned as its actual octane value was less than 100 RON.
- Latvia: 95 RON and 98 RON are widely available.
- Lebanon: 95 RON and 98 RON are widely available.
- Lithuania: 95 RON and 98 RON are widely available. In some gas stations E85 (bioethanol) gasoline, 98E15 (15% of ethanol), 98E25 (25% of ethanol) are available.
- Malaysia: 95 RON, 97 RON and 100 RON. "Regular" unleaded fuel is 95 RON; "Premium" fuel is rated at 97 RON (Shell's V-Power Racing is rated minimum 97 RON). Petron sells 100 RON in selected outlets.
- Mexico: The standard octane index is 87 AKI for regular fuel and anywhere from 91 to 93 AKI for premium fuel, although 91 AKI is the most common octane number for premium fuel. Valero is the only station offering 93 AKI fuel in Mexico, at a premium of 5% to 10% over standard 91 AKI fuel. Valero stations are usually present in main cities, such as Monterrey, Guadalajara, Querétaro and Puebla. From 1938 to 2018, Mexican government held a monopoly in the distribution of fuel, and its brands for unleaded fuel were "Pemex Magna" and "Pemex Premium", appearing in the early 1990s, before that, fuel was usually leaded. Mexican regulations do not enforce any particular labels to identify different grades of fuel as long as each grade is clearly labeled with distinct names and colors, but the long history of Pemex's colors has established a tradition of labeling regular fuel with green, premium fuel with red, and diesel with black. Gas station brands that use different colors include Shell, BP, Mobil and Akron.
- Mongolia: 92 RON and 95 RON (advertised as A92 and A95 respectively) are available at nearly all stations while slightly fewer stations offer 80 RON (advertised as A80). 98 RON (advertised as A98) is available in select few stations.
- Montenegro: 95 RON is sold as a "regular" fuel. As a "premium" fuel, 98 RON is sold. Both variants are unleaded.
- Myanmar: Most petrol stations carry 92 RON as standard especially in rural areas. Most larger cities and highway stations have introduced 95 RON in the past few years. The highest grade available is 97 RON which is only sold by a few stations in Yangon and Nay Pyi Taw (e.g., PTT, MMTM, Petrotrans).
- Netherlands: 95 RON "Euro" is sold at every station, whereas 98 RON "Super Plus" is being phased out in favor of "premium" fuels, which are all 95 RON fuels with extra additives. Shell V-Power is a 97 RON (labelled as 95 due to the legalities of only using 95 or 98 labelling), some independent tests have shown that one year after introduction it was downgraded to 95 RON, whereas in neighboring Germany Shell V-Power consists of the regular 100 RON fuel.
- New Zealand: 91 RON "Regular" and 95 RON "Premium" are both widely available. 98 RON is available instead of 95 RON at some (BP, Mobil, Gull) service stations in larger urban areas (newer BP stations also offer 95 by blending 91 and 98 where 98 is available). 100 RON is available at selected NPD service stations in the South Island and in very limited locations in the North Island.
- Norway: 95 RON is widely available, but 98 RON is also available at Shell under the name V-Power and at Esso; it is 10-20% more expensive than 95 RON fuel. In 2023, 95 RON fuel was changed to 95E10 and 98 RON to 98E5.
- Oman: 91 RON, 95 RON and 98 RON. "Regular" unleaded fuel is 91 RON; "Premium" fuel is rated at 95 RON; 98 RON in selected outlets.
- Pakistan: 3 types of fuel available. 92, HOBC 95 & HOBC 97 RON. Super marketed as 92 RON, 95 RON marketed by Shell as V-Power and 97 RON by Total Parco Pakistan & Pakistan State Oil (PSO). HOBC pricing was deregulated in October, 2016.
- Philippines: All automotive fuels are unleaded since December 23, 2000. Since late 2013, three grades of gasoline are available: Premium Plus, Premium (mid-grade) and Regular. Law requires the Premium Plus grade to be 97 RON or higher; Premium at 95 RON; Regular at 91 RON. Premium Plus grade fuels are exempted from having an ethanol blend, although the only Premium Plus grade available without ethanol is Petron Blaze and is rated at 100 RON. Other Premium Plus grades like Seaoil Extreme 97, Shell V-Power Racing and Unioil Gas 97 are rated at 97 RON, while Phoenix Premium 98 is rated at 98 RON. Premium grades such as Caltex Gold, Petron XCS, Phoenix Premium 95, Seaoil Extreme 95, Shell V-Power Nitro+, Unioil Gas 95 and Total Excellium are rated at 95 RON. Regular grades such as Caltex Silver, Petron Xtra Advance, Phoenix Super Regular 91, Seaoil Extreme U+, Shell FuelSave Unleaded, Unioil Gas 91 and Total Premier are rated at 91 RON.
- Poland: Eurosuper 95 (RON 95) is sold in every gas station. Super Plus 98 (RON 98) is available in most stations, sometimes under brand (Orlen – Verva, BP – Ultimate, Shell – V-Power) and usually containing additives. Shell offers V-Power Racing fuel which is rated RON 100.
- Portugal: 95 RON "Euro" is sold in every station and 98 RON "Super" being offered in almost every station.
- Russia: In the Soviet Union there were different grades of automobile gasoline, which had the following names: A-56, A-66, A-70, A-72, A-74, A-76, AI-93, AI-95 also known as "Extra", and B-70 (aviation gasoline). The first letter indicated the vehicle for which the gasoline was intended, the number indicated the octane. Gasolines A-56 and A-66, A-70, and later A-72, were intended for cars with flat-head engines produced in the 1930s-1960s. Gasolines A-74, later A-76 and AI-93 for cars with overhead valve engines produced in the 1960s-1980s. AI-95 gasoline was mainly for foreign cars or government limousines ZiL and Chaika. The letter "I" in the AI-93 and AI-95 brands indicated that the octane number was calculated using the research method. After the dissolution of the Soviet Union in the 1990s, A-76 gasoline was replaced by AI-80, and AI-93 by AI-92. By the early 1980s, production of A-66 gasoline ceased, and about a decade later, so did A-72. Nowadays 92 RON is the minimum available, the standard is 95 RON is sold in every gas station. 98 RON is available in most stations. As a "premium" fuel, 100 RON is sold, Gazpromneft and Lukoil both variants are unleaded.
- Saudi Arabia: Two types of fuel are available at all petrol stations in Saudi Arabia. "Premium 91" (RON 91) has green pumps, and "Super Premium 95" (RON 95) where the pumps are red. Fuel dyes are used to make the colour of the fuel match that of the pump. While petrol stations in Saudi Arabia are privatised, the prices are regulated by the authorities and have a fixed at SR 1.44 (US$0.38) and SR 2.10 (US$0.56) (as of 14 April 2019) per litre respectively; and is currently being increased at a quarterly rate to bring it up to the worldwide average by 2020. Prior to 2006, only Super Premium RON 95 was available and the pumps were not systematically coloured. The public did not know what octane rating was, so education campaigns were started, advising people to use "red petrol" only for high end cars, and to save money by using "green petrol" for regular cars and trucks.
- Singapore: All four providers, Caltex, ExxonMobil, SPC and Shell have 3 grades of gasoline. Typically, these are 92, 95, and 98 RON. However, since 2009, Shell has removed 92 RON.
- South Africa: "regular" unleaded fuel is 95 RON in coastal areas. Inland (higher elevation) "regular" unleaded fuel is 93 RON; once again most fuel stations optionally offer 95 RON.
- South Korea: "regular" unleaded fuel is 91~94 RON, "premium" is 95+ RON nationally. However, not all gas stations carry "premium."
- Spain: 95 RON "Euro" is sold in every station with 98 RON "Super" being offered in most stations. Many stations around cities and highways offer other high-octane "premium" brands.
- Sri Lanka: Sri Lanka switched their regular gasoline from 90 RON to 92 RON on January 1, 2014. In Ceypetco filling stations, 92 RON is the regular automotive fuel and 95 RON is called 'Super Petrol', which comes at a premium price. In LIOC filling stations, 92 RON is the regular automotive fuel and 95 RON is available as 'Premium Petrol'. As of 2022, LIOC fillings stations offer a new fuel labelled as 'XtraPremium' Petrol which is marketed as 'Euro 3' standard petrol. Similarly 95 RON petrol is offered as 'XtraPremium' 95 Petrol. Sri Lanka adopted RON 100 Octane 100 from July 2024. It is the 8th country in the world to use RON 100.
- Sweden: 95 RON, 98 RON and E85 are widely available.
- Taiwan: 92 RON, 95 RON and 98 RON are widely available at gas stations in Taiwan.
- Thailand: 95 RON, 95 RON E10, 91 RON E10, 95 RON E20 are widely available in all parts of Thailand. 97 RON E10 fuel is also available at some Bangchak filling stations in various parts of Thailand.
- Trinidad and Tobago: 92 RON (Super) and 95 RON (Premium) are widely available.
- Turkey: 95 RON and 95+ RON widely available in gas stations. 91 RON (Regular) has been dropped in 2006. 98 and 100 RON (Shell V-Power Racing) has been dropped in late 2009. The Gas which has been advertised 97 RON has been dropped in 2014 and renamed 95+.
- Ukraine: 80 RON and 98 RON gasoline is available. The standard gasoline is 95 RON, but 92 RON gasoline is also widely available and popular for older cars. There is no government regulation for gasoline with RON higher than 98 so some stations are marketing 100 RON gasoline when in reality this can be anything above 98 RON with extra cleaning additives.
- United Arab Emirates: 95 RON and 98 RON gasoline is available.
- United Kingdom: 'regular' gasoline has an octane rating of 95 RON, with 97 RON fuel being widely available as the Super Unleaded. Tesco and Shell both offer 99 RON fuel. In April 2006, BP started a public trial of the super-high octane gasoline BP Ultimate Unleaded 102, which as the name suggests, has an octane rating of 102 RON. Although BP Ultimate Unleaded (with an octane rating of 97 RON) and BP Ultimate Diesel are both widely available throughout the UK, BP Ultimate Unleaded 102 was available throughout the UK in only 10 filling stations, and was priced at about two and half times more than their 97 RON fuel. In March 2010, BP stopped sales of Ultimate Unleaded 102, citing the closure of their specialty fuels manufacturing facility. Shell V-Power is also available, but in a 99 RON octane rating, and Tesco fuel stations also supply the Greenergy produced 99 RON "Momentum^{99}".
- United States: In the U.S., gasoline octane is displayed in AKI. Most stations sell three grades: 87, 89–90, and 91–94 AKI. In the Rocky Mountain states, 85 AKI is sold as regular and 91 AKI is often the highest available, because thinner air at higher elevations lowers engine compression and reduces the chance of knock. However, while older carbureted cars could safely use 85 AKI at altitude, it is not recommended for modern fuel-injected vehicles and can cause engine damage or poor performance. On the East Coast, some stations offer higher-grade fuel, up to 94 AKI.
- Venezuela: 91 RON and 95 RON gasoline is available nationwide, in all PDV gas stations. 95 RON gasoline is the most widely used in the country, although most cars in Venezuela would work with 91 RON gasoline. This is because gasoline prices are heavily subsidized by the government (US$0.0083 per gallon 95 RON, vs US$0.0061 per gallon 91 RON). All gasoline in Venezuela is unleaded.
- Vietnam: 92 RON is in every gas station and 95 RON is in the urban area. They start selling A92-E5 gasoline (92 RON with 5 percent of ethanol) at 2017. On January 1, 2018, Vietnamese government forced every gas station stop selling 92 RON and sell 95 RON + A92-E5 instead. From 2022, Vietnam will start selling gasoline according to Euro 5 standards, with the choices 95 RON and 97 RON(in SFC gas stations).
- Zimbabwe: 93 octane available with no other grades of fuels available, E10 which is an ethanol blend of fuel at 10% ethanol is available the octane rating however is still to be tested and confirmed but it is assumed that it is around 95 Octane. E85 available from 3 outlets with an octane rating AKI index of between 102 and 105 depending on the base gasoline the ethanol is blended with.

== Misconceptions around octane rating ==
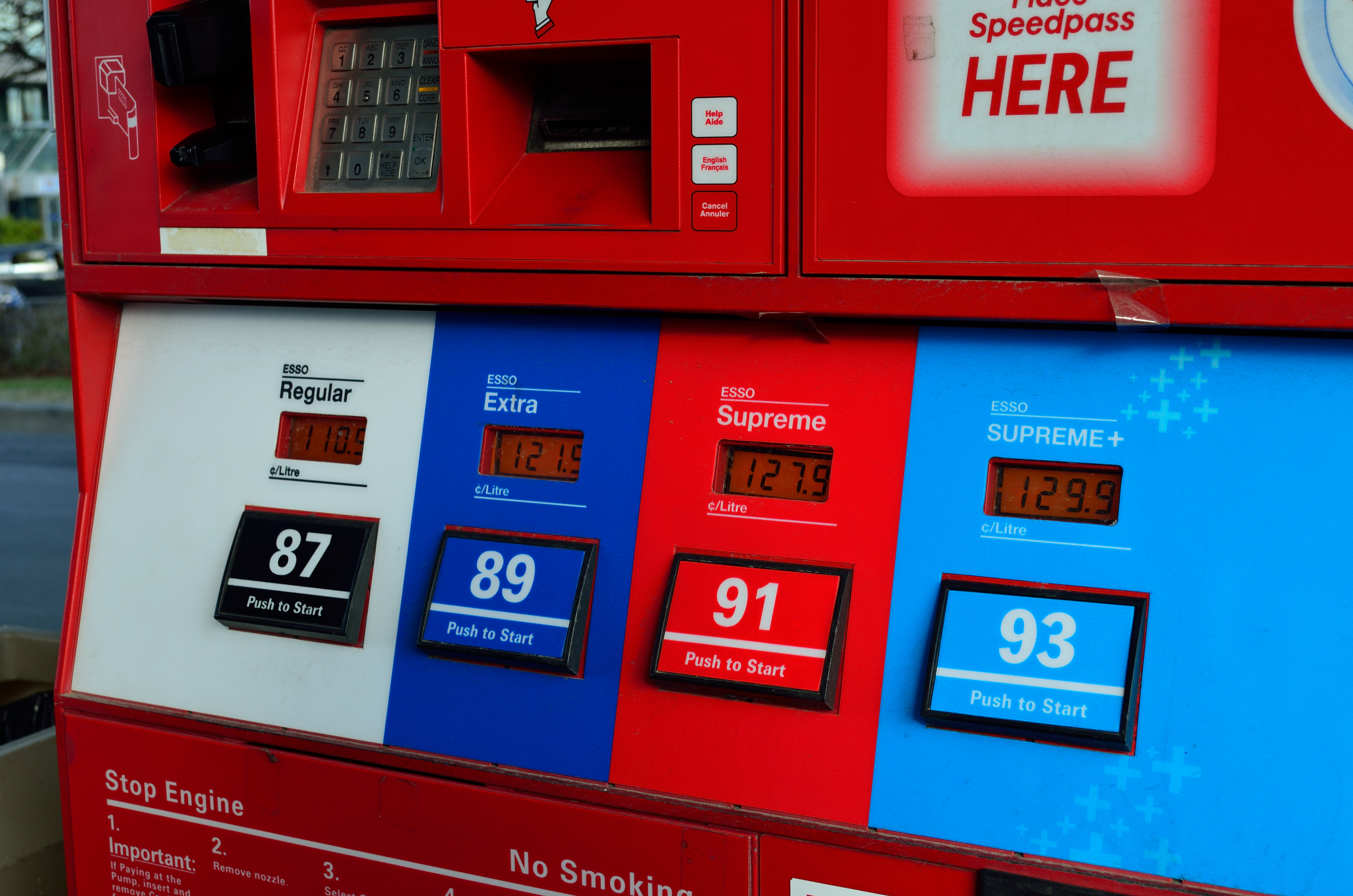
Gas stations have gasoline with different octane ratings. Higher numbers indicate that the fuel can better avoid unintended combustions within the cylinders of the engine.

Due to its name, the chemical "octane" is often misunderstood as the only substance that determines the octane rating (or octane number) of a fuel. This is an inaccurate description. In reality, the octane rating is defined as a number describing the stability and ability of a fuel to prevent an engine from unwanted combustions that occur spontaneously in the other regions within a cylinder (i.e., delocalized explosions from the spark plug). This phenomenon of combustion is more commonly known as engine knocking or self-ignition, which causes damage to pistons over time and reduces the lifespan of engines.

In 1927, Graham Edgar devised the method of using iso-octane and n-heptane as reference chemicals, in order to rate the knock resistance of a fuel with respect to this isomer of octane, thus the name "octane rating". By definition, the isomers iso-octane and n-heptane have an octane rating of 100 and 0, respectively. Because of its more volatile nature, n-heptane ignites and knocks readily, which gives it a relatively low octane rating; the isomer iso-octane causes less knocking because it is more branched and combusts more smoothly. In general, branched compounds with a higher intermolecular force (e.g., London dispersion force for iso-octane) will have a higher octane rating, as they are harder to ignite.

=== Octane ratings of octane isomers ===
Octane isomers such as n-octane and 2,3,3-trimethylpentane have an octane rating of -20 and 106.1, respectively (RON measurement). The large differences between the octane ratings for the isomers show that the compound octane itself is clearly not the only factor that determines octane ratings, especially for commercial fuels consisting of a wide variety of compounds.

== Octane in culture ==
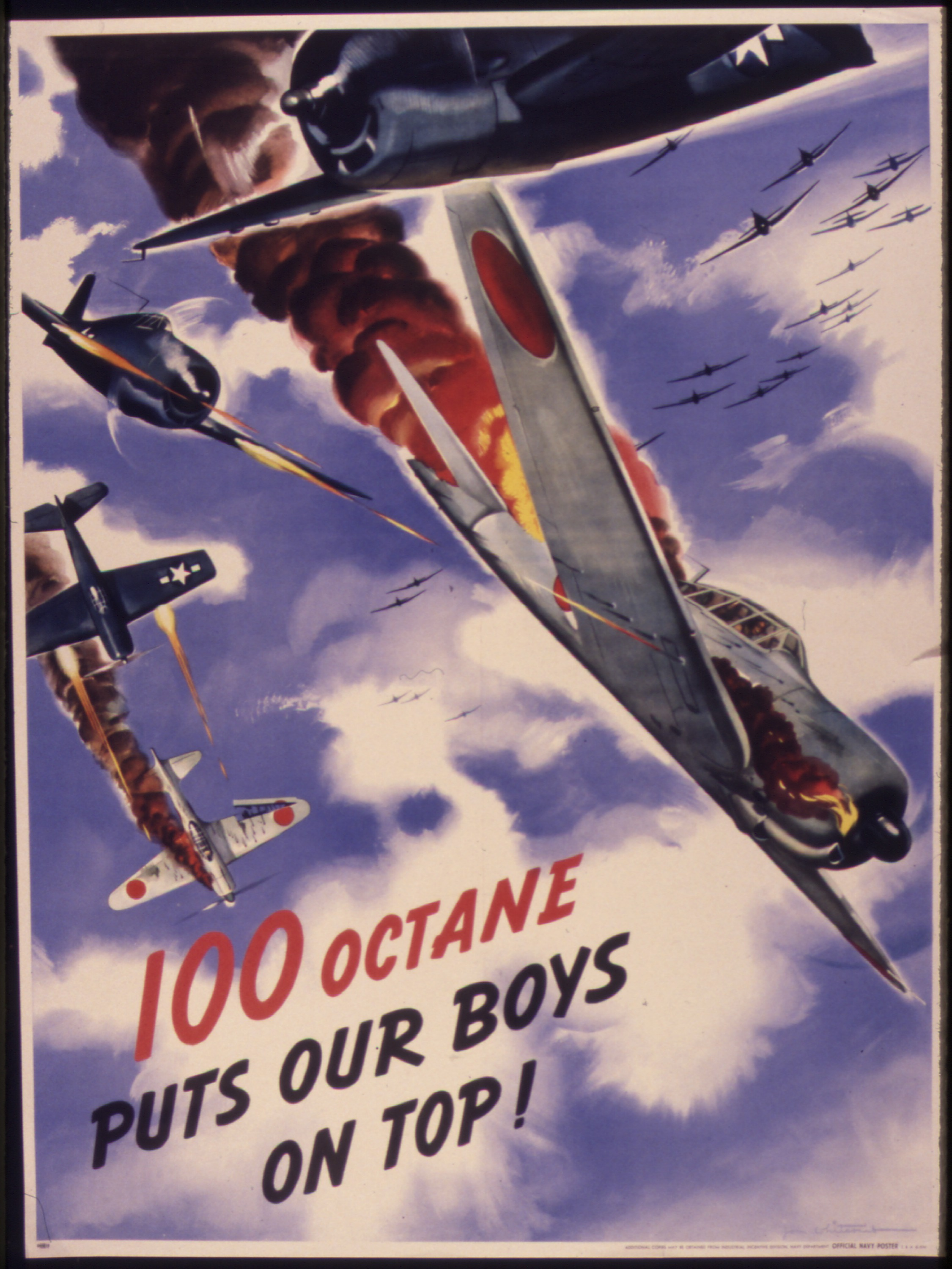
A 1940s US propaganda poster using the term "octane" to emphasise power

"Octane" is colloquially used in the expression "high-octane". The term is used to describe a powerful action because of the association with the concept of "octane rating". This is a misleading term, because the octane rating of gasoline is not directly related to the power output of an engine. Using gasoline of a higher octane than an engine is designed for cannot increase its power output.

Octane became well known in American popular culture in the 1960s, when gasoline companies boasted of "high octane" levels in their gasoline advertisements. The compound adjective "high-octane", meaning powerful or dynamic, is recorded in a figurative sense from 1944. By the 1990s, the phrase was commonly being used as a word intensifier, and it has found a place in modern English slang.

== See also ==
- Avgas
- Cetane number
