= 2,2-Dimethylbutane =

- Stereo, skeletal formula of 2,2-dimethylbutane with some implicit hydrogens shown

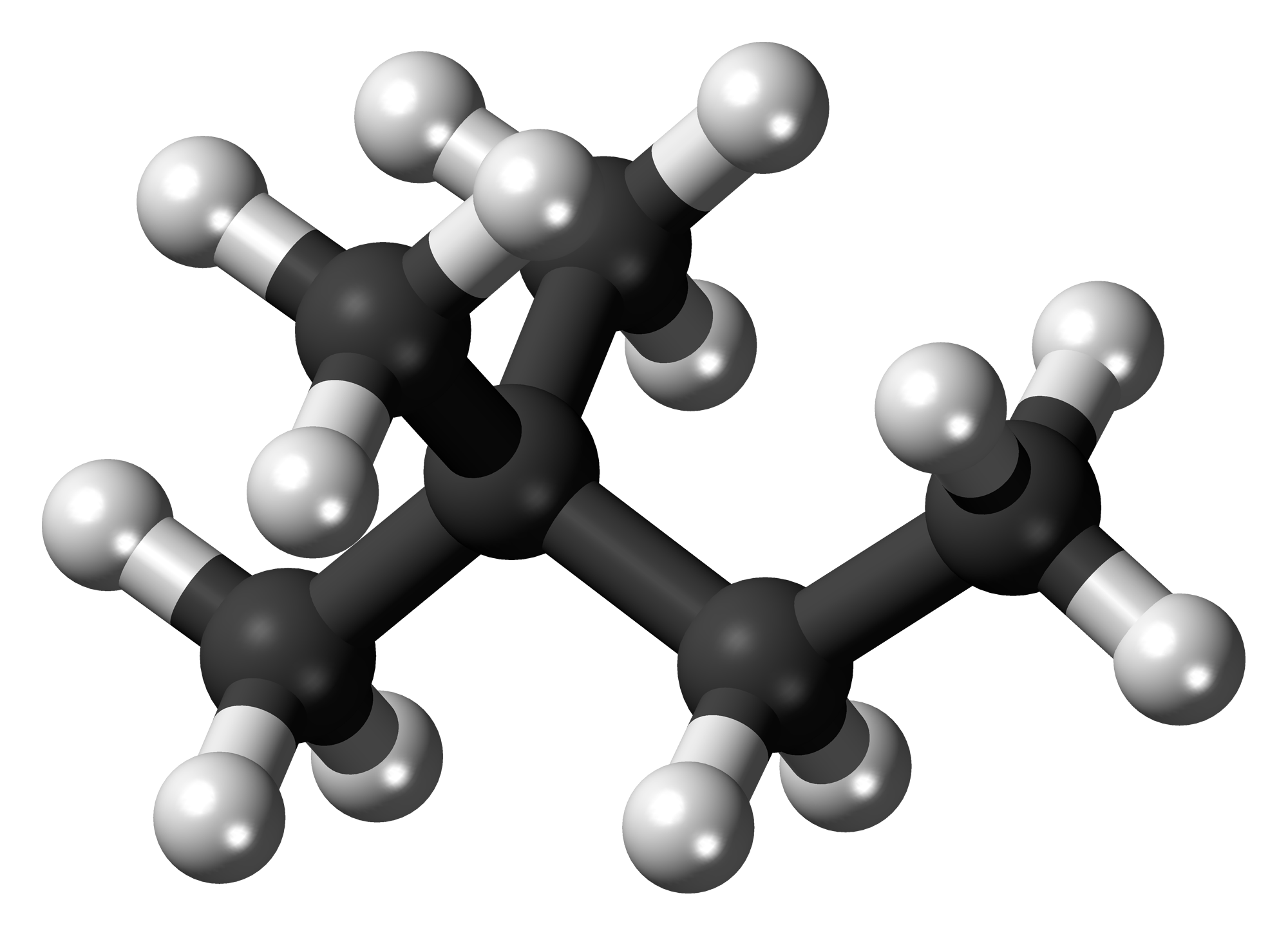
Ball stick model of 2,2-dimethylbutane
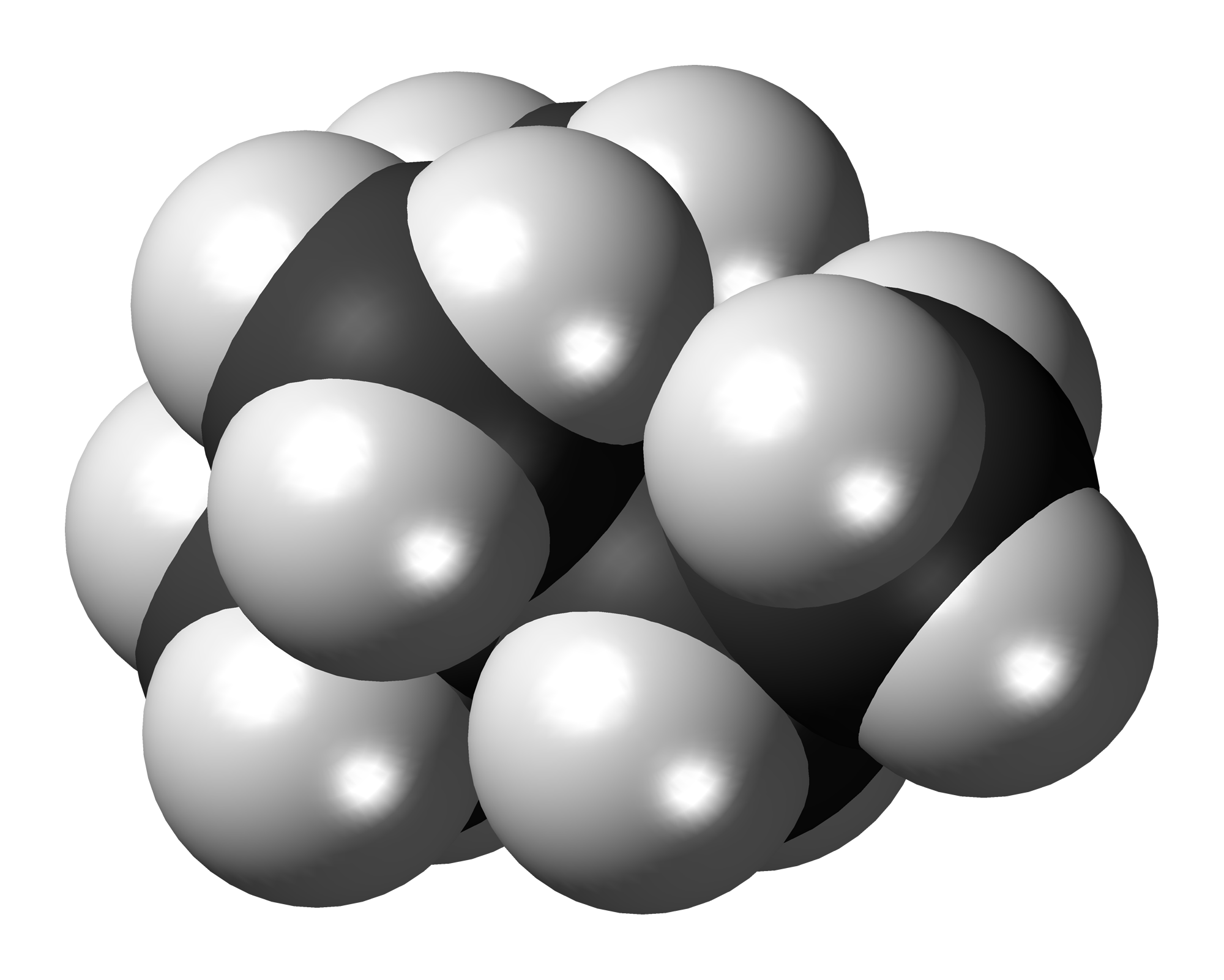
Spacefill model of 2,2-dimethylbutane

Names
- Preferred IUPAC name 2,2-Dimethylbutane
- Other names Neohexane, 22DMB

Identifiers
CAS Number	75-83-2
3D model (JSmol)	Interactive image
Beilstein Reference	1730736
ChEMBL	ChEMBL142735
ChemSpider	6163
ECHA InfoCard	100.000.825
EC Number	200-906-8
PubChem CID	6403
RTECS number	EJ9300000
UNII	07L56L3MP2
UN number	1208
CompTox Dashboard (EPA)	DTXSID4025111
- InChI: InChI=1S/C6H14/c1-5-6(2,3)4/h5H2,1-4H3 Key: HNRMPXKDFBEGFZ-UHFFFAOYSA-N
- SMILES: CCC(C)(C)C

Properties
Chemical formula	C_{6}H_{14}
Molar mass	86.178 g·mol^{−1}
Appearance	Colorless liquid
Odor	Odorless
Density	649 g/L
Melting point	−102 to −98 °C; −152 to −145 °F; 171 to 175 K
Boiling point	49.7 to 49.9 °C; 121.4 to 121.7 °F; 322.8 to 323.0 K
log P	3.51
Vapor pressure	36.88 kPa (at 20 °C)
Henry's law constant (k_{H})	6.5 nmol Pa^{−1} kg^{−1}
Magnetic susceptibility (χ)	−76.24·10^{−6} cm^{3}/mol
Refractive index (n_{D})	1.3688

Thermochemistry
Heat capacity (C)	189.67 J K^{−1} mol^{−1}
Std molar entropy (S^{⦵}_{298})	272.00 J K^{−1} mol^{−1}
Std enthalpy of formation (Δ_{f}H^{⦵}_{298})	−214.4 – −212.4 kJ mol^{−1}
Std enthalpy of combustion (Δ_{c}H^{⦵}_{298})	−4.1494 – −4.1476 MJ mol^{−1}

Hazards
- GHS labelling
Pictograms	(GHS02: Flammable) (GHS07: Exclamation mark) (GHS08: Health hazard) (GHS09: Environmental hazard)
Signal word	Danger
Hazard statements	H225, H304, H315, H336, H411
Precautionary statements	P210, P233, P240, P241, P242, P243, P261, P264, P271, P273, P280, P301+P316, P302+P352, P303+P361+P353, P304+P340, P319, P321, P331, P332+P317, P362+P364, P370+P378, P391, P403+P233, P403+P235, P405, P501
NFPA 704 (fire diamond)	2 3 0
Flash point	−48 °C (−54 °F; 225 K) closed cup
Autoignition temperature	405 °C (761 °F; 678 K)
Explosive limits	1.2–7.7%
- NIOSH (US health exposure limits)
PEL (Permissible)	none

Related compounds
Related alkanes	Neopentane; 2,3-Dimethylbutane; Triptane; Tetramethylbutane; Tetraethylmethane; 2,2,4-Trimethylpentane; 2,3,3-Trimethylpentane; 2,3,4-Trimethylpentane; Tetra-tert-butylmethane
- Except where otherwise noted, data are given for materials in their standard state (at 25 °C [77 °F], 100 kPa). verify (what is ?) Infobox references

2,2-Dimethylbutane, trivially known as neohexane at William Odling's 1876 suggestion, is an organic compound with formula C_{6}H_{14} or (H_{3}C-)_{3}-C-CH_{2}-CH_{3}. It is therefore an alkane, indeed the most compact and branched of the hexane isomers — the only one with a quaternary carbon and a butane (C_{4}) backbone.

== Synthesis ==
Butlerov's student V. Goryainov originally discovered neohexane in 1872 by cross-coupling of zinc ethyl with tert-butyl iodide.

2,2-Dimethylbutane can be synthesised by the hydroisomerisation of 2,3-dimethylbutane using an acid catalyst.

It can also be synthesised by isomerization of n-pentane in the presence of a catalyst containing combinations of one or more of palladium, platinum, rhodium and rhenium on a matrix of zeolite, alumina, silicon dioxide or other materials. Such reactions create a mixture of final products including isopentane, n-hexane, 3-methylpentane, 2-methylpentane, 2,3-dimethylbutane and 2,2-dimethylbutane. Since the composition of the final mixture is temperature dependant the desired final component can be obtained choice of catalyst and by combinations of temperature control and distillations.

== Uses ==
Neohexane is used as a high-octane anti-knock additive in gasoline and in the manufacture of agricultural chemicals. It is also used in a number of commercial, automobile and home maintenance products, such as adhesives, electronic contact cleaners and upholstery polish sprays.

In laboratory settings, it is commonly used as a probe molecule in techniques which study the active sites of metal catalysts. Such catalysts are used in hydrogen-deuterium exchange, hydrogenolysis, and isomerization reactions. It is well suited to this purpose as 2,2-dimethylbutane contains both an isobutyl and an ethyl group.

== See also ==
- Methylbutane (isopentane)
- 2-Methylpentane (isohexane)
