= Tetraethylmethane =

3,3-diethylpentane
- Structural formula of 3,3-diethylpentane

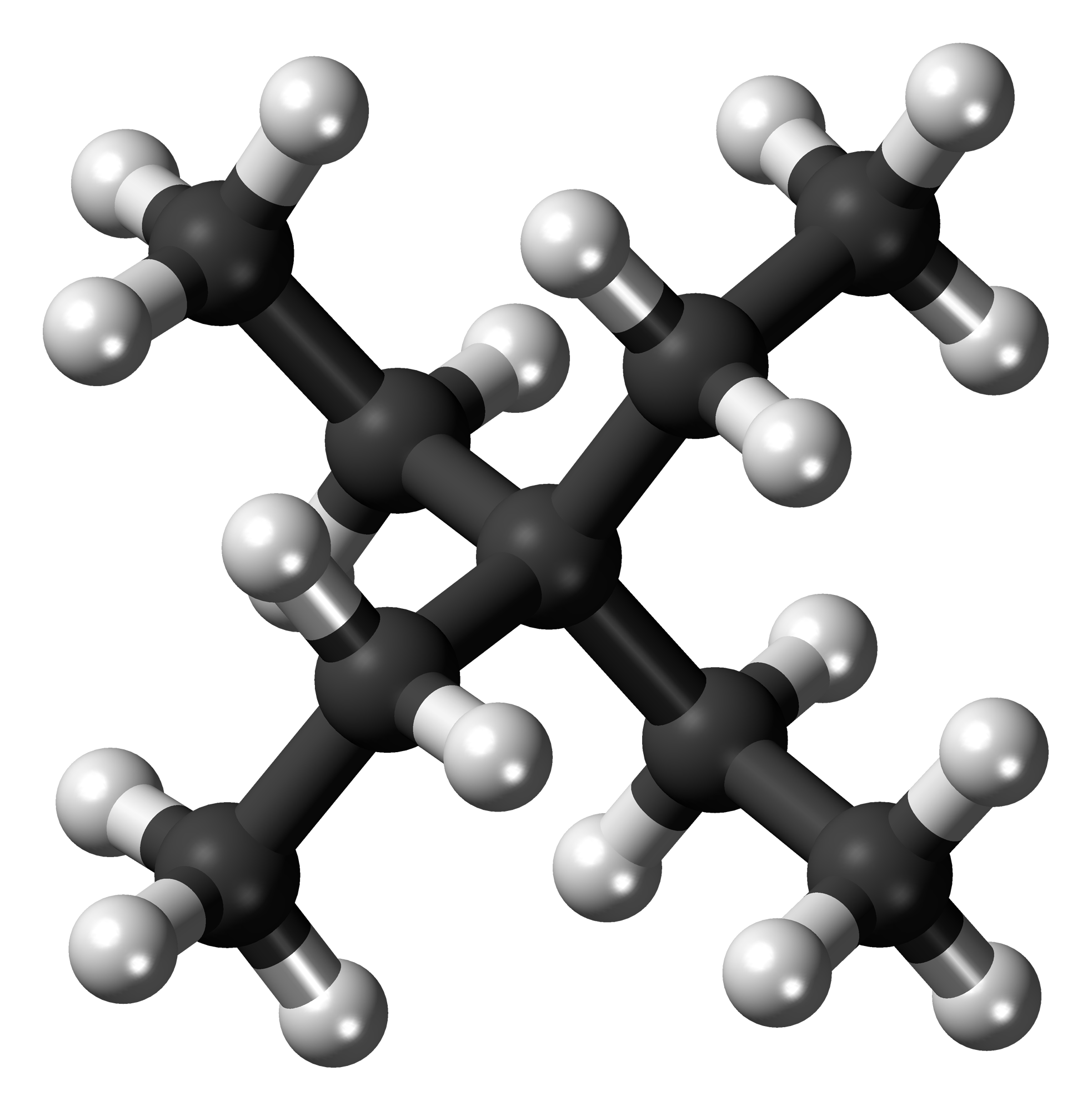
Ball and stick model of 3,3-diethylpentane
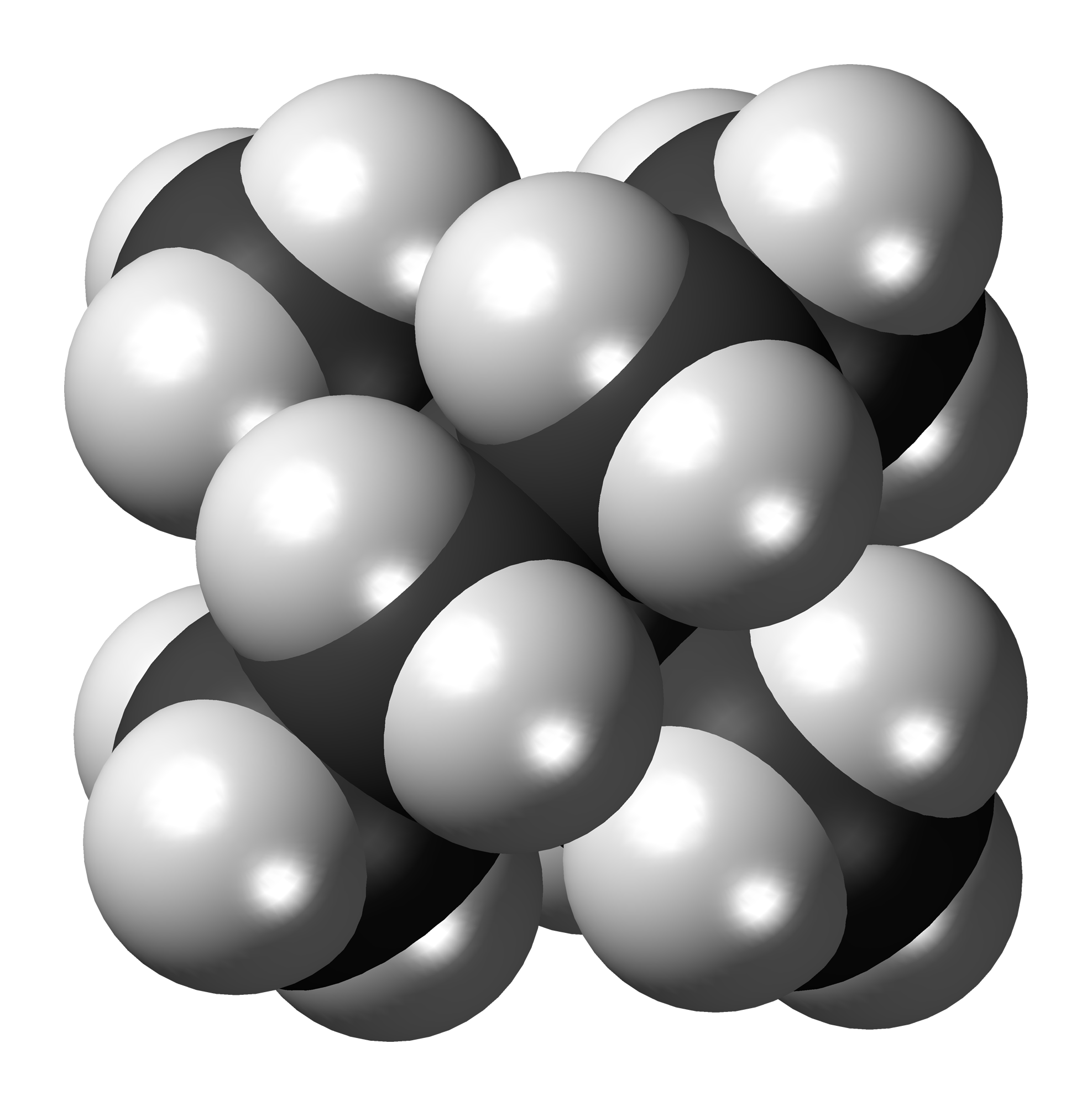
Space-filling model of 3,3-diethylpentane

Names
- Preferred IUPAC name 3,3-Diethylpentane

Identifiers
CAS Number	1067-20-5
3D model (JSmol)	Interactive image
Abbreviations	Et_{4}C
ChemSpider	13402
ECHA InfoCard	100.151.290
PubChem CID	14020
UNII	K2SWY952L9
CompTox Dashboard (EPA)	DTXSID1073941
- InChI: InChI=1S/C9H20/c1-5-9(6-2,7-3)8-4/h5-8H2,1-4H3 Key: BGXXXYLRPIRDHJ-UHFFFAOYSA-N
- SMILES: CCC(CC)(CC)CC

Properties
Chemical formula	C_{9}H_{20}
Molar mass	128.259 g·mol^{−1}
Appearance	Colourless liquid
Odor	Odourless
Density	724 mg mL^{−1}
Melting point	−34 to −30 °C; −29 to −22 °F; 239 to 243 K
Boiling point	145.8 to 146.6 °C; 294.3 to 295.8 °F; 418.9 to 419.7 K
Henry's law constant (k_{H})	1.5 nmol Pa^{−1} kg^{−1}

Thermochemistry
Heat capacity (C)	278.2 J K^{−1} mol^{−1}
Std molar entropy (S^{⦵}_{298})	333.4 J K^{−1} mol^{−1}
Std enthalpy of combustion (Δ_{c}H^{⦵}_{298})	−6.1261–−6.1229 MJ mol^{−1}

Hazards
- GHS labelling
Pictograms	(GHS02: Flammable)
Signal word	Danger
Hazard statements	H225, H226
Precautionary statements	P210, P233, P240, P241, P242, P243, P280, P303+P361+P353, P370+P378, P403+P235, P501
NFPA 704 (fire diamond)	0 3 0

Related compounds
Related alkanes	Neopentane; 2,2-Dimethylbutane; 2,3-Dimethylbutane; Triptane; Tetramethylbutane; 2,2,4-Trimethylpentane; 2,3,3-Trimethylpentane; 2,3,4-Trimethylpentane; Tetra-tert-butylmethane; 2,3-Dimethylhexane; 2,5-Dimethylhexane
Related compounds	Tetraethylsilane; Tetraethylgermanium; Tetraethyltin; Tetraethyllead
- Except where otherwise noted, data are given for materials in their standard state (at 25 °C [77 °F], 100 kPa). verify (what is ?) Infobox references

Tetraethylmethane, or 3,3-diethylpentane, is a branched alkane with 9 carbon atoms. It is a highly flammable and volatile liquid at room temperature. It is one of the isomers of nonane.

== See also ==
- Neopentane
- Tetraethynylmethane
- Tetramethoxymethane
