= Neopentane =

Chemical compound (C5H12)

- Stereo, skeletal formula of neopentane

- Skeletal formula of neopentane with all implicit carbons shown, and all explicit hydrogens added

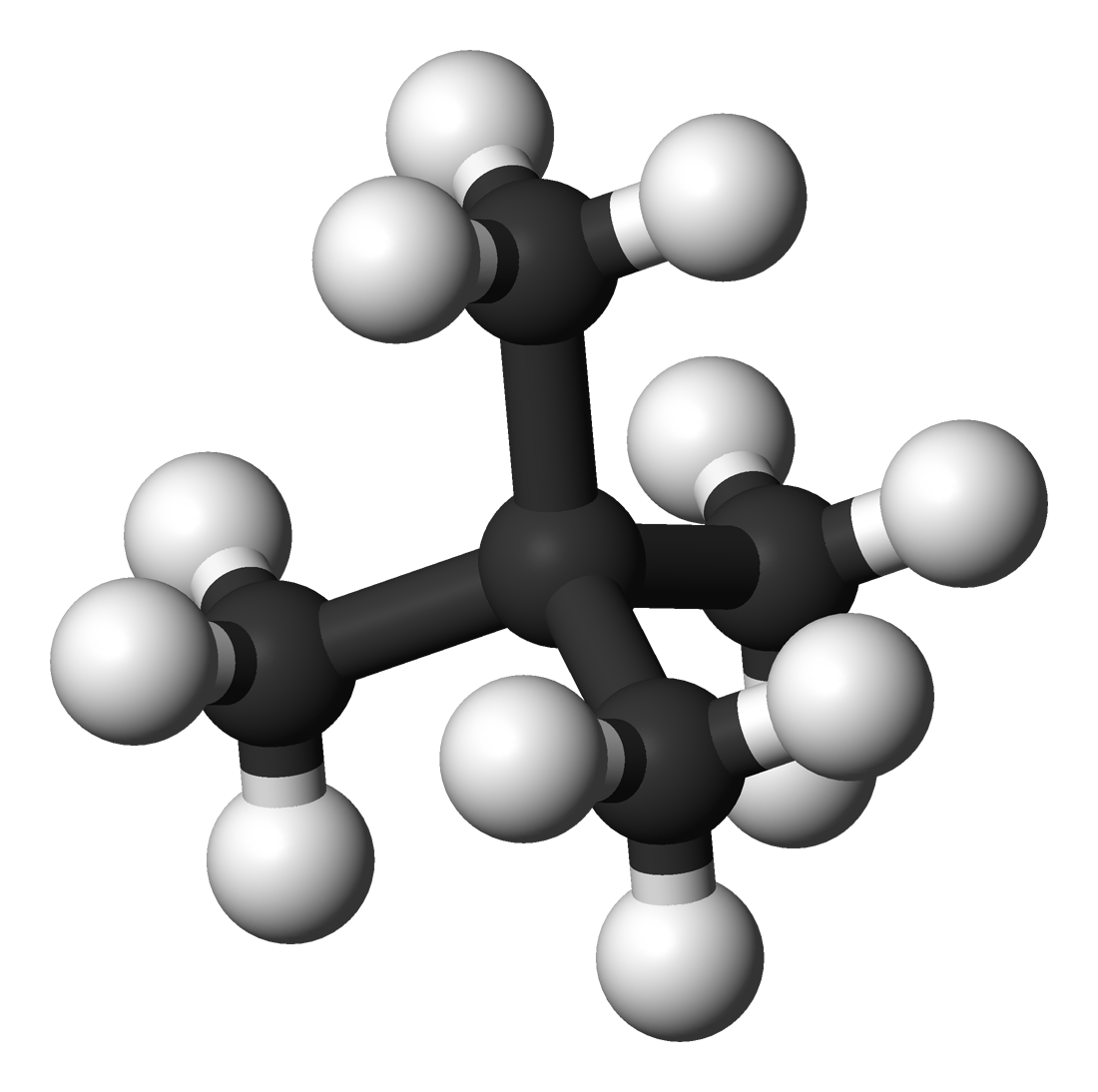
Ball and stick model of neopentane
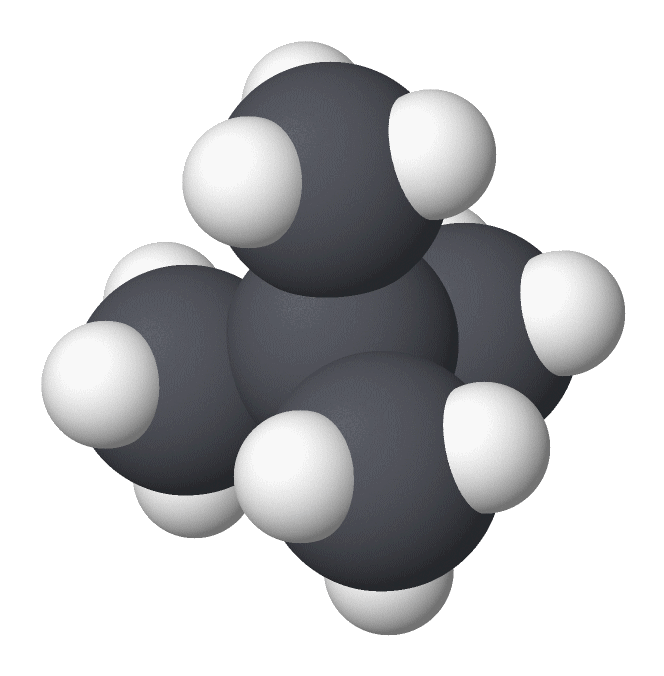
Spacefill model of neopentane

Names
- Preferred IUPAC name 2,2-Dimethylpropane
- Other names Neopentane; Tetramethylmethane

Identifiers
CAS Number	463-82-1
3D model (JSmol)	Interactive image
Abbreviations	Me_{4}C
Beilstein Reference	1730722
ChEBI	CHEBI:30358
ChemSpider	9646
ECHA InfoCard	100.006.677
EC Number	207-343-7
Gmelin Reference	1850
MeSH	neopentane
PubChem CID	10041
UNII	M863R1J0BP
UN number	2044
CompTox Dashboard (EPA)	DTXSID6029179
- InChI: InChI=1S/C5H12/c1-5(2,3)4/h1-4H3 Key: CRSOQBOWXPBRES-UHFFFAOYSA-N
- SMILES: CC(C)(C)C

Properties
Chemical formula	C(CH_{3})_{4}
Molar mass	72.151 g·mol^{−1}
Appearance	Colorless gas
Odor	Odorless
Density	3.255 kg/m^{3Ẽ} (gas, 9.5 °C); 601.172 kg/m^{3} (liquid, 9.5 °C)
Melting point	−16.5 °C (2.3 °F; 256.6 K)
Boiling point	9.5 °C (49.1 °F; 282.6 K)
Solubility in water	33.2 mg/L
Solubility	Soluble in ethanol, diethyl ether, carbon tetrachloride
log P	3.11
Vapor pressure	146 kPa (at 20 °C)
Henry's law constant (k_{H})	4.7 nmol Pa^{−1} kg^{−1}
Refractive index (n_{D})	1.3476 (at 6 °C)

Thermochemistry
Heat capacity (C)	121.07–120.57 J K^{−1} mol^{−1}
Std molar entropy (S^{⦵}_{298})	217 J K^{−1} mol^{−1}
Std enthalpy of formation (Δ_{f}H^{⦵}_{298})	−168.5–−167.3 kJ mol^{−1}
Std enthalpy of combustion (Δ_{c}H^{⦵}_{298})	−3.51506–−3.51314 MJ mol^{−1}

Hazards
- GHS labelling
Pictograms	(GHS02: Flammable) (GHS04: Compressed Gas) (GHS09: Environmental hazard)
Signal word	Danger
Hazard statements	H220, H411
Precautionary statements	P203, P210, P222, P273, P280, P377, P381, P391, P403, P501
NFPA 704 (fire diamond)	2 4 0
Autoignition temperature	450 °C (842 °F; 723 K)

Related compounds
Related alkanes	2,2-Dimethylbutane; 2,3-Dimethylbutane; Triptane; Tetramethylbutane; Tetraethylmethane; Tetra-tert-butylmethane
Related compounds	Tetramethylsilane; Tetramethylgermane; Tetramethylstannane; Tetramethylplumbane; Tetramethylammonium
- Except where otherwise noted, data are given for materials in their standard state (at 25 °C [77 °F], 100 kPa). verify (what is ?) Infobox references

Neopentane, also called 2,2-dimethylpropane, is a double-branched-chain alkane with five carbon atoms, with the chemical formula C(CH_{3})_{4}. Neopentane is a flammable gas at room temperature and pressure which can condense into a highly volatile liquid on a cold day, in an ice bath, or when compressed to a higher pressure.

Neopentane is the simplest alkane with a quaternary carbon, and has achiral tetrahedral symmetry. It is one of the three structural isomers with the molecular formula C_{5}H_{12} (pentanes), the other two being n-pentane and isopentane. Out of these three, it is the only one to be a gas at standard conditions; the others are liquids.

It was first synthesized by Russian chemist Mikhail Lvov in 1870.

== Nomenclature ==
The traditional name neopentane, coined by William Odling in 1876, was still retained in the 1993 IUPAC recommendations, but is no longer recommended according to the 2013 recommendations. The preferred IUPAC name is the systematic name 2,2-dimethylpropane, but the substituent numbers are superfluous because it is the only possible "dimethylpropane".

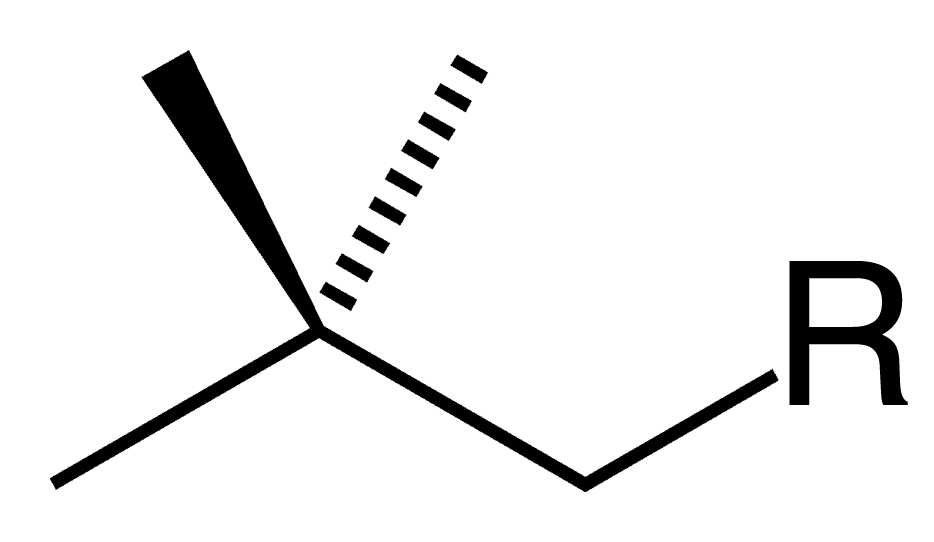
A neopentyl group attached to a generic group R.

A neopentyl substituent, often symbolized by "Np", has the structure Me_{3}C–CH_{2}– for instance neopentyl alcohol (Me_{3}CCH_{2}OH or NpOH). As Np also symbolises the element neptunium (atomic number 93), one should use this abbreviation with care.

The obsolete name tetramethylmethane is also used, especially in older sources.

== Physical properties ==
=== Boiling and melting points ===
The boiling point of neopentane is only 9.5 °C, significantly lower than those of isopentane (27.7 °C) and normal pentane (36.0 °C). Therefore, neopentane is a gas at room temperature and atmospheric pressure, while the other two isomers are liquids.

The melting point of neopentane (−16.6 °C), on the other hand, is 140 degrees higher than that of isopentane (−159.9 °C) and 110 degrees higher than that of n-pentane (−129.8 °C). This anomaly has been attributed to the better solid-state packing assumed to be possible with the tetrahedral neopentane molecule; but this explanation has been challenged on account of it having a lower density than the other two isomers. Moreover, its enthalpy of fusion is lower than the enthalpies of fusion of both n-pentane and isopentane, thus indicating that its high melting point is due to an entropy effect resulting from higher molecular symmetry. Indeed, the entropy of fusion of neopentane is about four times lower than that of n-pentane and isopentane.

=== ^{1}H NMR spectrum ===
Because of neopentane's full tetrahedral symmetry, all protons are chemically equivalent, leading to a single NMR chemical shift δ = 0.902 when dissolved in carbon tetrachloride. In this respect, neopentane is similar to its silane analog, tetramethylsilane, whose single chemical shift is zero by convention.

The symmetry of the neopentane molecule can be broken if some hydrogen atoms are replaced by deuterium atoms. In particular, if each methyl group has a different number of substituted atoms (0, 1, 2, and 3), one obtains a chiral molecule. The chirality in this case arises solely by the mass distribution of its nuclei, while the electron distribution is still essentially achiral.

== Derivatives ==
The alcohol pentaerythritol can be described as the result of replacing one hydrogen in each of the four methyl groups by a hydroxyl (–OH) group.

A linear polymer with alternating neopentane and orthocarbonate groups, which can be described as an ester (pentaerythritol orthocarbonate, white crystalline solid) with formula [(−CH_{2})_{2}C(CH_{2}−)_{2} (−O)_{2}C(O−)_{2}]_{n}, was synthesized in 2002.
