= Triptane =

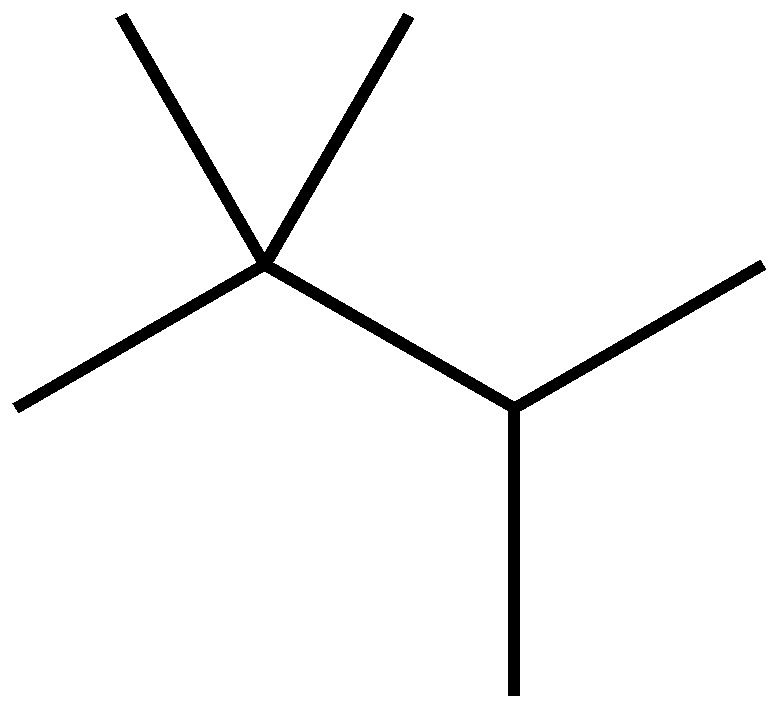
Skeletal formula of triptane
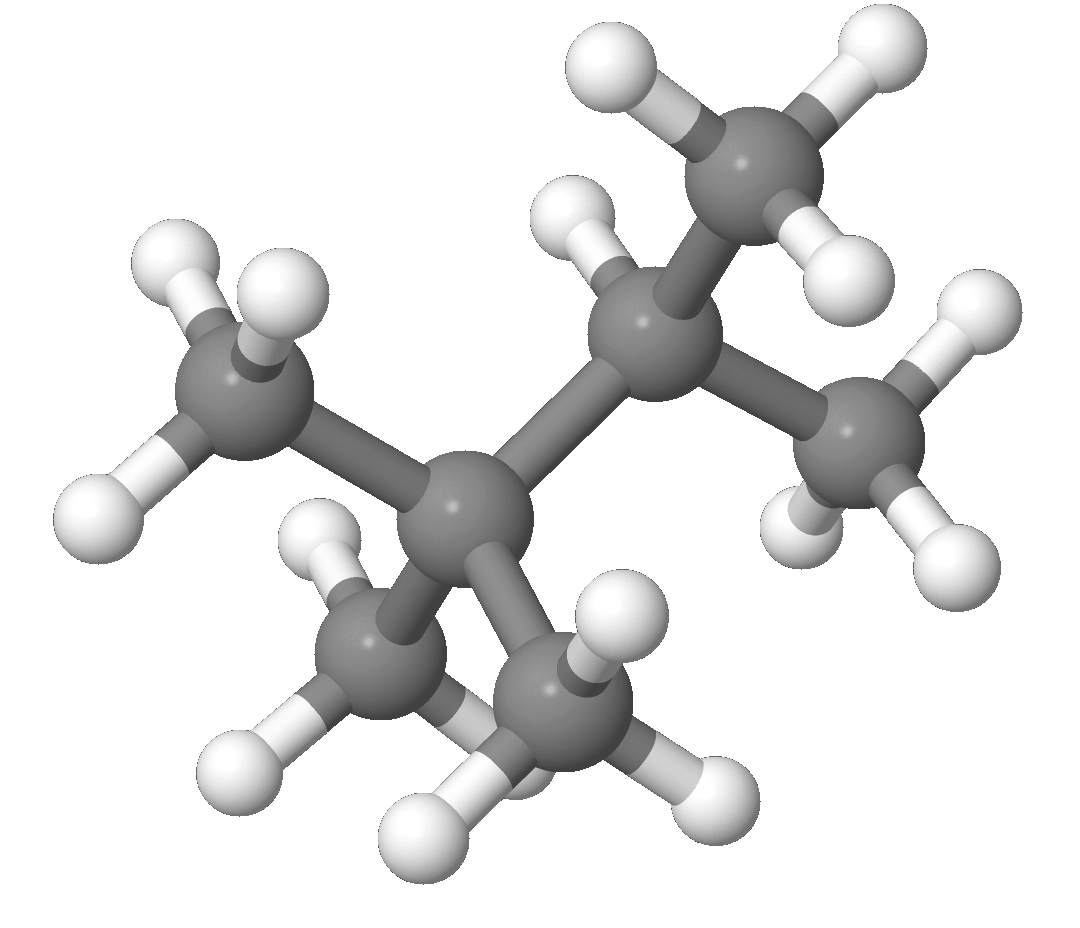
Ball-and-Stick model of triptane

Names
- Preferred IUPAC name 2,2,3-Trimethylbutane

Identifiers
CAS Number	464-06-2
3D model (JSmol)	Interactive image
Beilstein Reference	1730756
ChemSpider	9649
ECHA InfoCard	100.006.680
EC Number	207-346-3
PubChem CID	10044
UNII	40V943JDGR
UN number	1206
CompTox Dashboard (EPA)	DTXSID7060047
- InChI: InChI=1S/C7H16/c1-6(2)7(3,4)5/h6H,1-5H3 Key: ZISSAWUMDACLOM-UHFFFAOYSA-N
- SMILES: CC(C)C(C)(C)C

Properties
Chemical formula	C_{7}H_{16}
Molar mass	100.205 g·mol^{−1}
Appearance	Colorless liquid
Odor	Odorless
Density	0.693 g mL^{−1}
Melting point	−26 to −24 °C; −15 to −11 °F; 247 to 249 K
Boiling point	80.8 to 81.2 °C; 177.3 to 178.1 °F; 353.9 to 354.3 K
Vapor pressure	23.2286 kPa (at 37.7 °C)
Henry's law constant (k_{H})	4.1 nmol Pa^{−1} kg^{−1}
Magnetic susceptibility (χ)	−88.36·10^{−6} cm^{3}/mol
Refractive index (n_{D})	1.389

Thermochemistry
Heat capacity (C)	213.51 J K^{−1} mol^{−1}
Std molar entropy (S^{⦵}_{298})	292.25 J K^{−1} mol^{−1}
Std enthalpy of formation (Δ_{f}H^{⦵}_{298})	−238.0 – −235.8 kJ mol^{−1}
Std enthalpy of combustion (Δ_{c}H^{⦵}_{298})	−4.80449 – −4.80349 MJ mol^{−1}

Hazards
- GHS labelling
Pictograms	(GHS02: Flammable) (GHS07: Exclamation mark) (GHS08: Health hazard) (GHS09: Environmental hazard)
Signal word	Danger
Hazard statements	H225, H302, H305, H315, H336, H400
Precautionary statements	P210, P261, P273, P301+P310, P331
NFPA 704 (fire diamond)	0 3 0
Flash point	−7 °C (19 °F; 266 K)
Autoignition temperature	450 °C (842 °F; 723 K)
Explosive limits	1–7%

Related compounds
Related alkanes	Neopentane; 2,2-Dimethylbutane; 2,3-Dimethylbutane; Tetramethylbutane; Tetraethylmethane; 2,2,4-Trimethylpentane; 2,3,3-Trimethylpentane; 2,3,4-Trimethylpentane; Tetra-tert-butylmethane
- Except where otherwise noted, data are given for materials in their standard state (at 25 °C [77 °F], 100 kPa). Infobox references

Triptane, or 2,2,3-trimethylbutane, is an organic chemical compound with the molecular formula C_{7}H_{16} or (H_{3}C-)_{3}C-C(-CH_{3})_{2}H. It is therefore an alkane, specifically the most compact and heavily branched of the heptane isomers, the only one with a butane (C_{4}) backbone.

It was first synthesized in 1922 by Belgian chemists Georges Chavanne (1875–1941) and B. Lejeune, who called it trimethylisopropylmethane.

Due to its high octane rating (112–113 RON, 101 MON) triptane was produced on alkylation units starting from 1943 for use as an anti-knock additive in gasoline. It was extensively researched for this role and received the modern name in the late 1930s at a joint laboratory of NACA, National Bureau of Standards, US Army Air Corps and the Bureau of Aeronautics.

As of 2011, it was not a significant component of US automobile gasoline, present only in trace amounts (0.05–0.1%).

== See also ==
- List of gasoline additives
