= Tetra-tert-butylmethane =

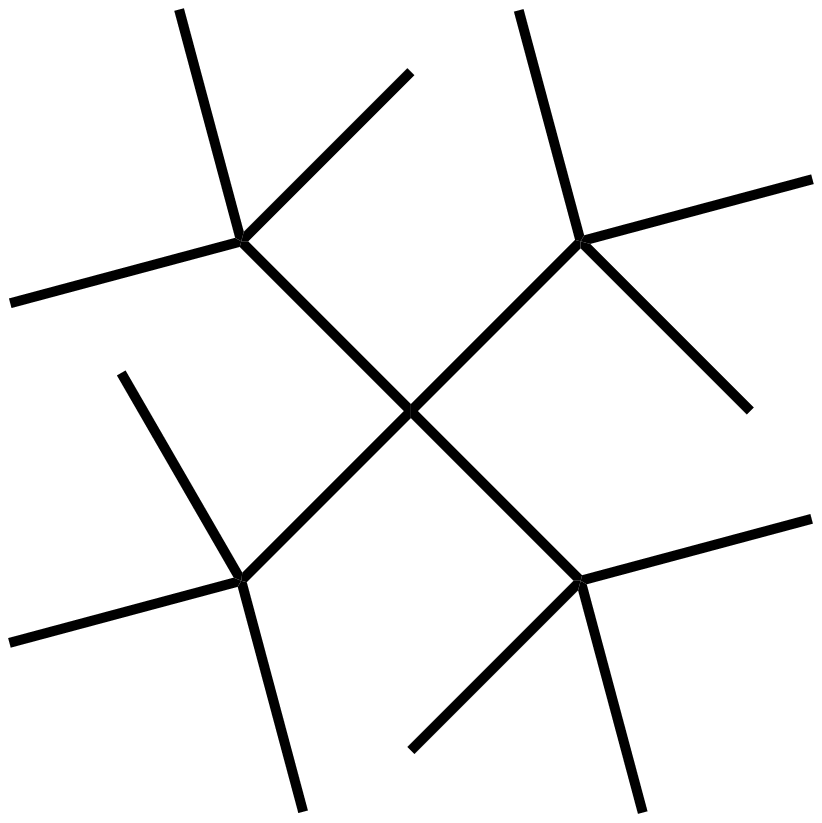
- Structural formula of tetra-tert-butylmethane

Names
- Preferred IUPAC name 3,3-Di-tert-butyl-2,2,4,4-tetramethylpentane

Identifiers
CAS Number	4103-17-7
3D model (JSmol)	Interactive image
Abbreviations	(Me_{3}C)_{4}C (t-Bu)_{4}C (tBu)_{4}C (^{t}Bu)_{4}C
ChemSpider	14288112
PubChem CID	14123361
CompTox Dashboard (EPA)	DTXSID10556285
- InChI: InChI=1S/C17H36/c1-13(2,3)17(14(4,5)6,15(7,8)9)16(10,11)12/h1-12H3 Key: CHNAIAPYMXIYRV-UHFFFAOYSA-N
- SMILES: CC(C)(C)C(C(C)(C)C)(C(C)(C)C)C(C)(C)C

Properties
Chemical formula	C_{17}H_{36}
Molar mass	240.475 g·mol^{−1}

Related compounds
Related alkanes	2,2-Dimethylbutane; 2,3-Dimethylbutane; Triptane; Tetramethylbutane; Tetraethylmethane; 2,2,4-Trimethylpentane; 2,3,3-Trimethylpentane; 2,3,4-Trimethylpentane; 2,3-Dimethylhexane; 2,5-Dimethylhexane
- Except where otherwise noted, data are given for materials in their standard state (at 25 °C [77 °F], 100 kPa). verify (what is ?) Infobox references

Tetra-tert-butylmethane is a hypothetical organic compound with formula C_{17}H_{36}, consisting of four tert-butyl groups bonded to a central carbon atom. It would be an alkane, specifically the most compact branched isomer of heptadecane.

Some calculations suggest this compound cannot exist due to the steric hindrance among the closely packed tert-butyl groups, which would make it one of the smallest, if not the smallest itself, saturated and acyclic hydrocarbon that cannot exist. It is speculated that at the pressures required to create this molecule, the carbon atoms form into diamond lattice.

Other calculations suggest that the molecule would be stable, with the C–C bonds to the central ("methane") carbon having a length of 166.1 pm — longer than the typical C−C bond in order to reduce steric effects, but still shorter than those found in some other real molecules.

== See also ==
- Neopentane
- Tetrakis(trimethylsilyl)methane
- Tetrafluoromethane
- Tetrachloromethane
- Tetrabromomethane
- Tetraiodomethane
- Tetraazidomethane
- Tetracyanomethane
- Tetraethynylmethane
- Tetranitromethane
