= 2,3,4-Trimethylpentane =

- Skeletal formula of 2,3,4-trimethylpentane with some implicit hydrogens added

Names
- Preferred IUPAC name 2,3,4-Trimethylpentane

Identifiers
CAS Number	565-75-3
3D model (JSmol)	Interactive image
Beilstein Reference	1696869
ChEBI	CHEBI:165735
ChemSpider	10795
ECHA InfoCard	100.008.448
EC Number	209-292-6
MeSH	2,3,4-trimethylpentane
PubChem CID	11269
RTECS number	SA3321500
UNII	WOJ1QVR6OA
UN number	3295
CompTox Dashboard (EPA)	DTXSID6060343
- InChI: InChI=1S/C8H18/c1-6(2)8(5)7(3)4/h6-8H,1-5H3 Key: RLPGDEORIPLBNF-UHFFFAOYSA-N
- SMILES: CC(C)C(C)C(C)C

Properties
Chemical formula	C_{8}H_{18}
Molar mass	114.232 g·mol^{−1}
Appearance	Colourless liquid
Odor	Odourless
Density	719 mg mL^{−1}
Melting point	−109.7 to −109.0 °C; −165.5 to −164.1 °F; 163.4 to 164.2 K
Boiling point	113.4 to 114.0 °C; 236.0 to 237.1 °F; 386.5 to 387.1 K
Vapor pressure	6.7549 kPa (at 37.7 °C)
Henry's law constant (k_{H})	5.6 nmol Pa^{−1} kg^{−1}
Refractive index (n_{D})	1.404

Thermochemistry
Heat capacity (C)	247.32 J K^{−1} mol^{−1}
Std molar entropy (S^{⦵}_{298})	329.32 J K^{−1} mol^{−1}
Std enthalpy of formation (Δ_{f}H^{⦵}_{298})	−256.9–−253.5 kJ mol^{−1}
Std enthalpy of combustion (Δ_{c}H^{⦵}_{298})	−5.4671–−5.4639 MJ mol^{−1}

Hazards
- GHS labelling
Pictograms	(GHS02: Flammable) (GHS07: Exclamation mark) (GHS08: Health hazard) (GHS09: Environmental hazard)
Signal word	Danger
Hazard statements	H225, H304, H315, H336, H410
Precautionary statements	P210, P261, P273, P301+P310, P331
Flash point	4 °C (39 °F; 277 K)
Explosive limits	1–?%

Related compounds
Related alkanes	2,2-Dimethylbutane; 2,3-Dimethylbutane; Triptane; Tetramethylbutane; Tetraethylmethane; 2,2,4-Trimethylpentane; 2,3,3-Trimethylpentane; Tetra-tert-butylmethane; 2,3-Dimethylhexane; 2,5-Dimethylhexane
- Except where otherwise noted, data are given for materials in their standard state (at 25 °C [77 °F], 100 kPa). verify (what is ?) Infobox references

2,3,4-Trimethylpentane is a branched alkane. It is one of the isomers of octane.
