= 2,2,4-Trimethylpentane =

Chemical compound

- Skeletal formula of 2,2,4-trimethylpentane

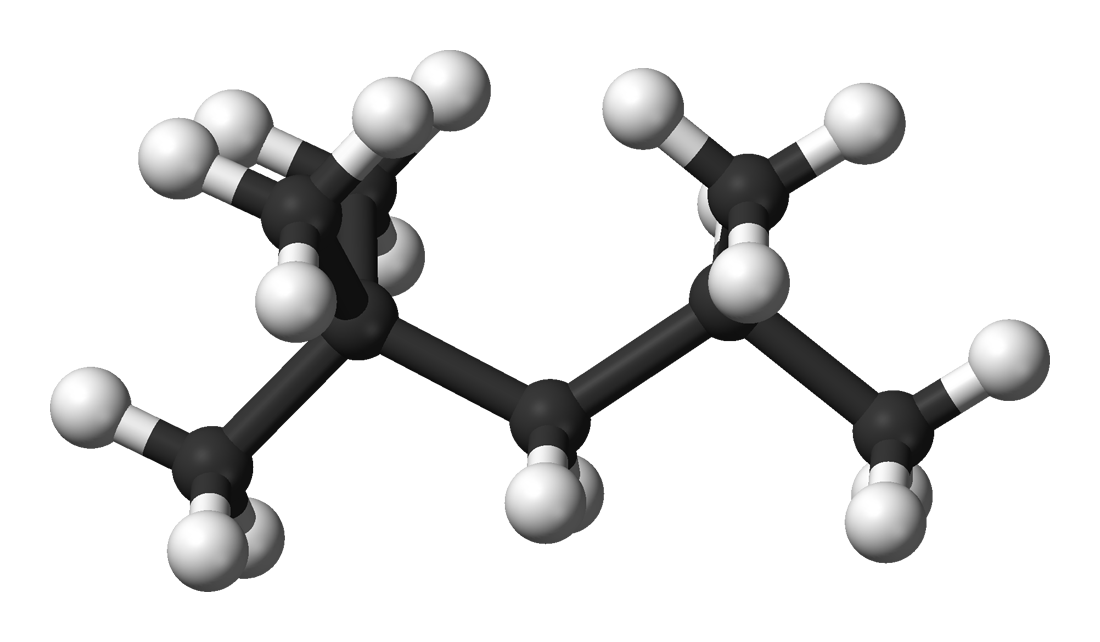
- Ball and stick model of 2,2,4-trimethylpentane

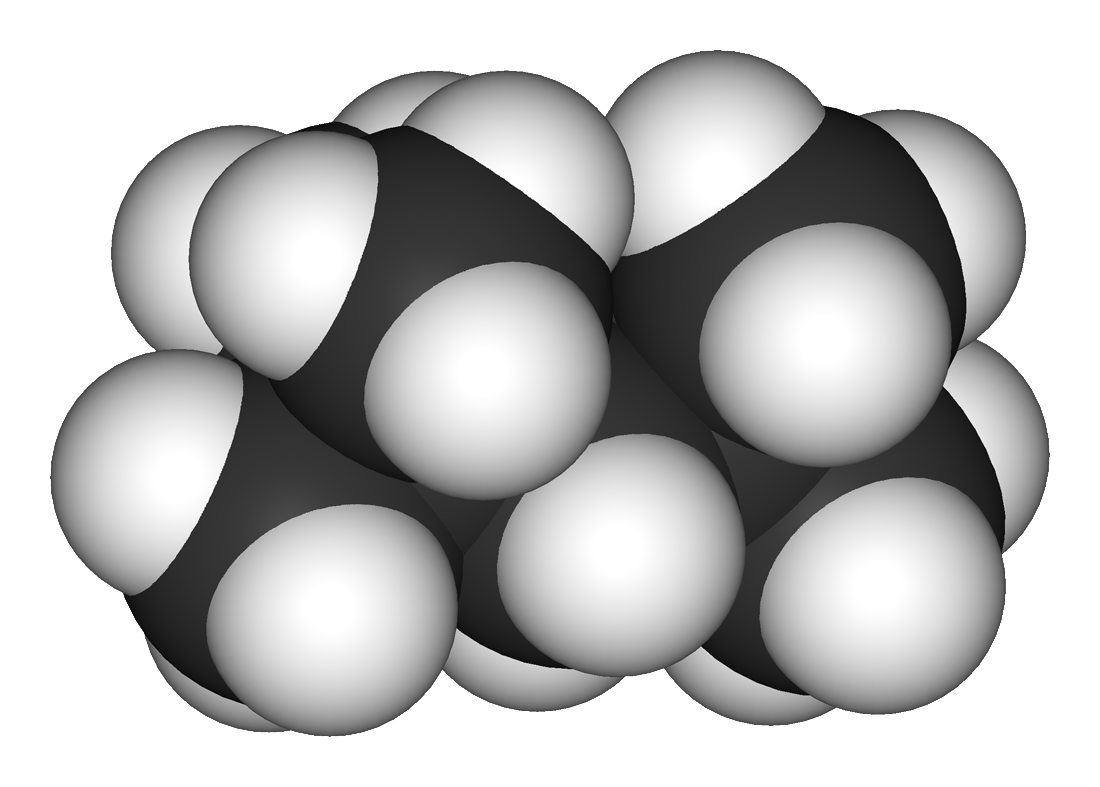
- Spacefill model of 2,2,4-trimethylpentane

Names
- Preferred IUPAC name 2,2,4-Trimethylpentane

Identifiers
CAS Number	540-84-1
3D model (JSmol)	Interactive image
Beilstein Reference	1696876
ChEBI	CHEBI:62805
ChEMBL	ChEMBL1797261
ChemSpider	10445
ECHA InfoCard	100.007.964
EC Number	208-759-1
MeSH	2,2,4-trimethylpentane
PubChem CID	10907
RTECS number	SA3320000
UNII	QAB8F5669O
UN number	1262
CompTox Dashboard (EPA)	DTXSID7024370
- InChI: InChI=1S/C8H18/c1-7(2)6-8(3,4)5/h7H,6H2,1-5H3 Key: NHTMVDHEPJAVLT-UHFFFAOYSA-N
- SMILES: CC(C)CC(C)(C)C

Properties
Chemical formula	C_{8}H_{18}
Molar mass	114.232 g·mol^{−1}
Appearance	Colorless liquid
Odor	petroleum-like
Density	0.692 g cm^{−3}
Melting point	−107.38 °C; −161.28 °F; 165.77 K
Boiling point	99.30 °C; 210.74 °F; 372.45 K
log P	4.373
Vapor pressure	5.5 kPa (at 21 °C)
Henry's law constant (k_{H})	3.0 nmol Pa^{−1} kg^{−1}
UV-vis (λ_{max})	210 nm
Magnetic susceptibility (χ)	−98.34·10^{−6} cm^{3}/mol
Refractive index (n_{D})	1.391

Thermochemistry
Heat capacity (C)	242.49 J K^{−1} mol^{−1}
Std molar entropy (S^{⦵}_{298})	328.03 J K^{−1} mol^{−1}
Std enthalpy of formation (Δ_{f}H^{⦵}_{298})	−260.6 to −258.0 kJ mol^{−1}
Std enthalpy of combustion (Δ_{c}H^{⦵}_{298})	−5462.6 to −5460.0 kJ mol^{−1}

Hazards
- GHS labelling
Pictograms	(GHS02: Flammable) (GHS07: Exclamation mark) (GHS08: Health hazard) (GHS09: Environmental hazard)
Signal word	Danger
Hazard statements	H225, H304, H315, H336, H410
Precautionary statements	P210, P261, P273, P301+P310, P331
NFPA 704 (fire diamond)	1 3 0
Flash point	−12 °C (10 °F; 261 K)
Autoignition temperature	396 °C (745 °F; 669 K)
Explosive limits	1.1–6.0%

Related compounds
Related alkanes	2,2-Dimethylbutane; 2,3-Dimethylbutane; Triptane; Tetramethylbutane; Tetraethylmethane; 2,3,3-Trimethylpentane; 2,3,4-Trimethylpentane; Tetra-tert-butylmethane; 2,3-Dimethylhexane; 2,5-Dimethylhexane
- Except where otherwise noted, data are given for materials in their standard state (at 25 °C [77 °F], 100 kPa). verify (what is ?) Infobox references

2,2,4-Trimethylpentane, also known as isooctane or iso-octane, is an organic compound with the formula (CH_{3})_{3}CCH_{2}CH(CH_{3})_{2}. It is one of several isomers of octane (C_{8}H_{18}). This particular isomer is the standard 100 point on the octane rating scale (the zero point is n-heptane). It is an important component of gasoline, frequently used in relatively large proportions (around 10%) to increase the knock resistance of fuel.

Strictly speaking, if the standard meaning of "iso" is followed, the name isooctane should be reserved for the isomer 2-methylheptane. However, 2,2,4-trimethylpentane is by far the most important isomer of octane and historically it has been assigned this name.

== Production ==
Isooctane is produced on a massive scale in the petroleum industry by alkylation of isobutene with isobutane. This process is conducted in alkylation units in the presence of acid catalysts.

Route to 2,2,4-trimethylpentane from isobutene and isobutane

It can also be produced from isobutylene by dimerization using an Amberlyst catalyst to produce a mixture of iso-octenes. Hydrogenation of this mixture produces 2,2,4-trimethylpentane.

== History ==
Engine knocking is an unwanted process that can occur during high compression ratios in internal combustion engines. During the 1920s different measurement methods of knock were proposed but laboratories struggled to reproduce them reliably.

In 1926 Ethyl Corporation's Graham Edgar selected two specific hydrocarbons, n-heptane (commercially available in high purity from Jeffrey pine) and 2,2,4-trimethylpentane, itself first synthesized from tert-butyl alcohol via diisobutene by J. W. McKinney at the same laboratory in the same year, as primary standards. Compared to various chemicals and natural gasolines proposed before that, these two compounds had extremely close boiling points, ensuring the vapor mixture in the cylinder would be the same regardless of the carburetor, and didn't depend on the composition of particular crudes.

This method became known as the octane rating scale. Test motors using 2,2,4-trimethylpentane gave a certain performance that was standardized as 100 octane. The same test motors, run in the same fashion, using heptane, gave a performance which was standardized as 0 octane. All other fuels were then graded against mixtures of these two chemicals and assigned octane numbers.

== Safety ==
In common with all hydrocarbons, 2,2,4-trimethylpentane is flammable.

== See also ==
- Oil refinery
- Antiknock agents
