= Tetramethylbutane =

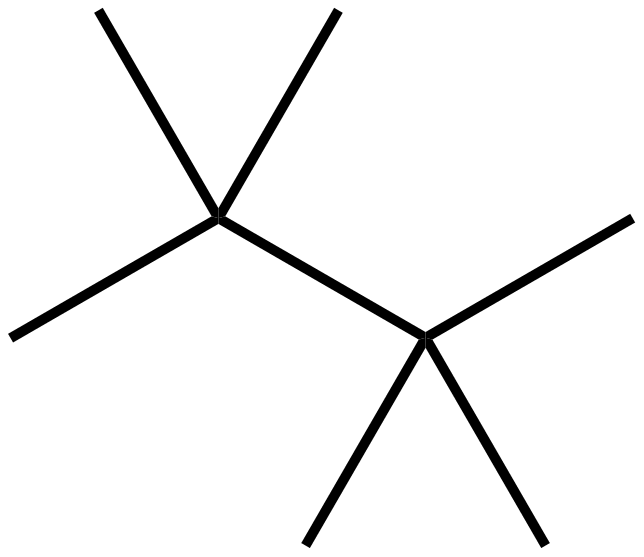
- Skeletal formula of tetramethylbutane

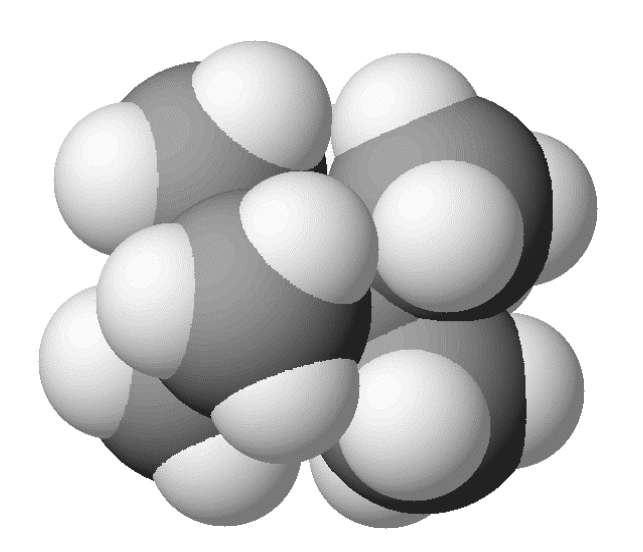
- Spacefill model of tetramethylbutane

Names
- Preferred IUPAC name 2,2,3,3-Tetramethylbutane

Identifiers
CAS Number	594-82-1
3D model (JSmol)	Interactive image
ChemSpider	11185
ECHA InfoCard	100.008.961
EC Number	209-855-6
PubChem CID	11675
UNII	EB34RI15NY
UN number	1325
CompTox Dashboard (EPA)	DTXSID9073204
- InChI: InChI=1S/C8H18/c1-7(2,3)8(4,5)6/h1-6H3 Key: OMMLUKLXGSRPHK-UHFFFAOYSA-N
- SMILES: CC(C)(C)C(C)(C)C

Properties
Chemical formula	C_{8}H_{18}
Molar mass	114.232 g·mol^{−1}
Appearance	White, opaque, waxy crystals
Odor	Odorless
Melting point	98 to 104 °C; 208 to 219 °F; 371 to 377 K
Boiling point	106.0 to 107.0 °C; 222.7 to 224.5 °F; 379.1 to 380.1 K
Henry's law constant (k_{H})	2.9 nmol Pa^{−1} kg^{−1}

Thermochemistry
Heat capacity (C)	232.2 J K^{−1} mol^{−1} (at 2.8 °C)
Std molar entropy (S^{⦵}_{298})	273.76 J K^{−1} mol^{−1}
Std enthalpy of formation (Δ_{f}H^{⦵}_{298})	−270.3 – −267.9 kJ mol^{−1}
Std enthalpy of combustion (Δ_{c}H^{⦵}_{298})	−5.4526 – −5.4504 MJ mol^{−1}

Hazards
- GHS labelling
Pictograms	(GHS02: Flammable) (GHS07: Exclamation mark) (GHS08: Health hazard) (GHS09: Environmental hazard)
Signal word	Danger
Hazard statements	H228, H304, H315, H336, H410
Precautionary statements	P210, P240, P241, P261, P264, P271, P273, P280, P301+P310, P302+P352, P304+P340, P312, P321, P331, P332+P313, P362, P370+P378, P391, P403+P233, P405, P501
Flash point	4 °C (39 °F; 277 K)
Explosive limits	1–?%

Related compounds
Related alkanes	Neopentane; 2,2-Dimethylbutane; 2,3-Dimethylbutane; Triptane; Tetraethylmethane; 2,2,4-Trimethylpentane; 2,3,3-Trimethylpentane; 2,3,4-Trimethylpentane; Tetra-tert-butylmethane
- Except where otherwise noted, data are given for materials in their standard state (at 25 °C [77 °F], 100 kPa). verify (what is ?) Infobox references

Tetramethylbutane, sometimes called hexamethylethane, is a hydrocarbon with formula C_{8}H_{18} or (H_{3}C-)_{3}C-C(-CH_{3})_{3}. It is the most heavily branched and most compact of the octane isomers, the only one with a butane (C4) backbone. Because of its highly symmetrical structure, it has a very high melting point and a short liquid range; in fact, it is the smallest saturated acyclic hydrocarbon that appears as a solid at a room temperature of 25 °C. (Among cyclic hydrocarbons, cubane, C_{8}H_{8}, norbornane, C_{7}H_{12} and norbornene, C_{7}H_{10} are even smaller and are also solid at room temperature.) It is also the most stable C_{8}H_{18} isomer, with a heat of formation 4.18 kcal/mol (17.5 kJ/mol) lower than that of n-octane, a fact that has been attributed to stabilizing dispersive interactions (electron correlation) between the methyl groups (protobranching).

The compound can be obtained from ethyl bromide, tert-butyl bromide, and magnesium metal in the presence of manganese(II) ions. Despite conditions amenable to the formation of a Grignard reagent, organomagnesium compounds are believed not to be the active species. Instead, they transmetalate to organomanganese compounds, which then decompose to tert-butyl radicals, which dimerize.

The full IUPAC name of the compound is 2,2,3,3-tetramethylbutane, but the numbers are superfluous in this case because there is no other possible arrangement of "tetramethylbutane".
