= 2,3-Dimethylbutane =

- Skeletal formula of 2,3-dimethylbutane with some implicit hydrogens shown

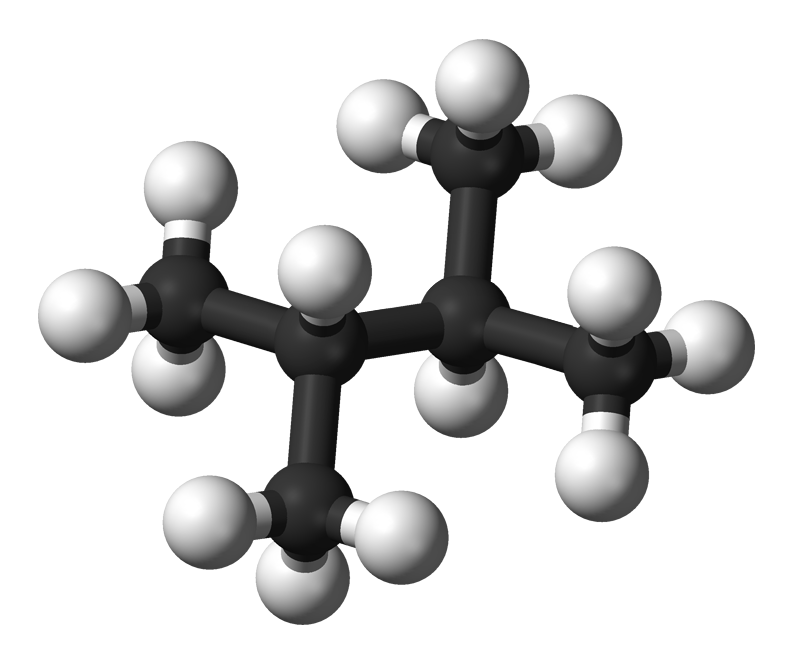
- Ball and stick model of 2,3-dimethylbutane

Names
- Preferred IUPAC name 2,3-Dimethylbutane
- Other names 2,3-Diisohexane; Diisopropyl; 23DMB; Biisopropyl

Identifiers
CAS Number	79-29-8
3D model (JSmol)	Interactive image
Beilstein Reference	1730737
ChEBI	CHEBI:141560
ChemSpider	6340
ECHA InfoCard	100.001.085
EC Number	201-193-6
MeSH	2,3-dimethylbutane
PubChem CID	6589
RTECS number	EJ9350000
UNII	68ISQ7A432
UN number	2457
CompTox Dashboard (EPA)	DTXSID9025112
- InChI: InChI=1S/C6H14/c1-5(2)6(3)4/h5-6H,1-4H3 Key: ZFFMLCVRJBZUDZ-UHFFFAOYSA-N
- SMILES: CC(C)C(C)C

Properties
Chemical formula	C_{6}H_{14}
Molar mass	86.178 g·mol^{−1}
Appearance	Colorless liquid
Odor	Odorless
Density	662 g/L
Melting point	−136 to −124 °C; −213 to −191 °F; 137 to 149 K
Boiling point	57.9 to 58.3 °C; 136.1 to 136.8 °F; 331.0 to 331.4 K
Vapor pressure	26.1 kPa (at 21.1 °C)
Henry's law constant (k_{H})	7.6 nmol Pa^{−1} kg^{−1}
Magnetic susceptibility (χ)	−76.22·10^{−6} cm^{3}/mol
Refractive index (n_{D})	1.375

Thermochemistry
Heat capacity (C)	189.02 J K^{−1} mol^{−1}
Std molar entropy (S^{⦵}_{298})	278.85 J K^{−1} mol^{−1}
Std enthalpy of formation (Δ_{f}H^{⦵}_{298})	−208.0 – −206.0 kJ mol^{−1}
Std enthalpy of combustion (Δ_{c}H^{⦵}_{298})	−4.1558 – −4.1540 MJ mol^{−1}

Hazards
- GHS labelling
Pictograms	(GHS02: Flammable) (GHS07: Exclamation mark) (GHS08: Health hazard) (GHS09: Environmental hazard)
Signal word	Danger
Hazard statements	H225, H305, H315, H336, H411
Precautionary statements	P210, P233, P240, P241, P242, P243, P261, P264, P271, P273, P280, P301+P316, P302+P352, P303+P361+P353, P304+P340, P319, P321, P331, P332+P317, P362+P364, P370+P378, P391, P403+P233, P403+P235, P405, P501
NFPA 704 (fire diamond)	1 3 0
Flash point	−29 °C (−20 °F; 244 K) closed cup
Autoignition temperature	405 °C (761 °F; 678 K)
Explosive limits	1.2–7.7%
- NIOSH (US health exposure limits)
PEL (Permissible)	none

Related compounds
Related alkanes	Neopentane; 2,2-Dimethylbutane; Triptane; Tetramethylbutane; Tetraethylmethane; 2,2,4-Trimethylpentane; 2,3,3-Trimethylpentane; 2,3,4-Trimethylpentane; Tetra-tert-butylmethane
- Except where otherwise noted, data are given for materials in their standard state (at 25 °C [77 °F], 100 kPa). verify (what is ?) Infobox references

2,3-Dimethylbutane is an isomer of hexane. It has the chemical formula (CH_{3})_{2}CHCH(CH_{3})_{2}. It is a colorless liquid which boils at 57.9 °C.
