= 2,3,3-Trimethylpentane =

- Skeletal formula of 2,3,3-trimethylpentane with some implicit hydrogens shown

Names
- Preferred IUPAC name 2,3,3-Trimethylpentane

Identifiers
CAS Number	560-21-4
3D model (JSmol)	Interactive image
ChEBI	CHEBI:143849
ChemSpider	10742
ECHA InfoCard	100.008.371
EC Number	209-207-2
PubChem CID	11215
RTECS number	SA3321000
UNII	J62AAG7FN0
UN number	1262
CompTox Dashboard (EPA)	DTXSID2060333
- InChI: InChI=1S/C8H18/c1-6-8(4,5)7(2)3/h7H,6H2,1-5H3 Key: OKVWYBALHQFVFP-UHFFFAOYSA-N
- SMILES: CCC(C)(C)C(C)C

Properties
Chemical formula	C_{8}H_{18}
Molar mass	114.232 g·mol^{−1}
Appearance	Colourless liquid
Odor	Odourless
Melting point	−102 to −100 °C; −152 to −148 °F; 171 to 173 K
Boiling point	114.4 to 115.0 °C; 237.8 to 238.9 °F; 387.5 to 388.1 K
Henry's law constant (k_{H})	2.4 nmol Pa^{−1} kg^{−1}

Thermochemistry
Heat capacity (C)	245.56 J K^{−1} mol^{−1}
Std enthalpy of formation (Δ_{f}H^{⦵}_{298})	−255.1–−252.3 kJ mol^{−1}
Std enthalpy of combustion (Δ_{c}H^{⦵}_{298})	−5.4683–−5.4657 MJ mol^{−1}

Hazards
- GHS labelling
Pictograms	(GHS02: Flammable) (GHS07: Exclamation mark) (GHS08: Health hazard) (GHS09: Environmental hazard)
Signal word	Danger
Hazard statements	H225, H304, H315, H336, H410
Precautionary statements	P210, P261, P273, P301+P310, P331
Flash point	−6 °C (21 °F; 267 K)
Autoignition temperature	425 °C (797 °F; 698 K)

Related compounds
Related alkanes	2,2-Dimethylbutane; 2,3-Dimethylbutane; Triptane; Tetramethylbutane; Tetraethylmethane; 2,2,4-Trimethylpentane; 2,3,4-Trimethylpentane; Tetra-tert-butylmethane; 2,3-Dimethylhexane; 2,5-Dimethylhexane
- Except where otherwise noted, data are given for materials in their standard state (at 25 °C [77 °F], 100 kPa). verify (what is ?) Infobox references

2,3,3-Trimethylpentane is a chemical compound in the family of hydrocarbons which has a formula of C_{8}H_{18}. It is an isomer of octane. It has a role as a human metabolite, a bacterial metabolite and a mammalian metabolite. It is an alkane and a volatile organic compound.
