= 2,3-Dimethylhexane =

- Skeletal formula of 2,3-Dimethylhexane

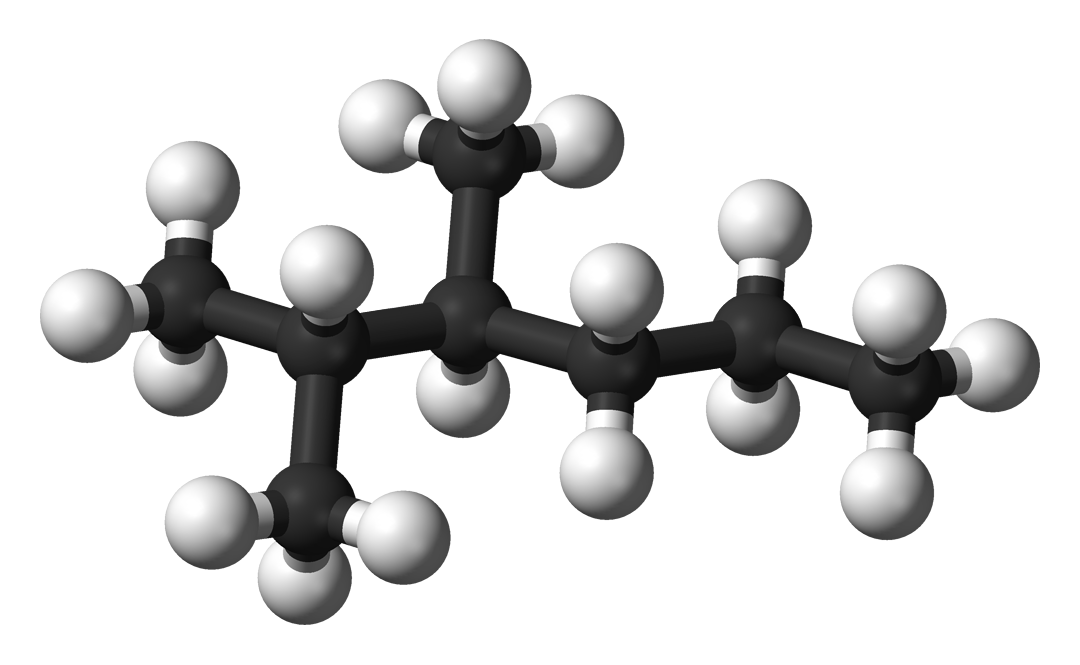
- Ball and stick model of 2,3-dimethylhexane

Names
- Preferred IUPAC name 2,3-Dimethylhexane

Identifiers
CAS Number	584-94-1
3D model (JSmol)	Interactive image
ChemSpider	10963; 553611 R; 18527723 S
ECHA InfoCard	100.008.681
PubChem CID	11447; 638047 R; 22810194 S
CompTox Dashboard (EPA)	DTXSID40862240
- InChI: InChI=1S/C8H18/c1-5-6-8(4)7(2)3/h7-8H,5-6H2,1-4H3 Key: JXPOLSKBTUYKJB-UHFFFAOYSA-N
- SMILES: CCCC(C)C(C)C

Properties
Chemical formula	C_{8}H_{18}
Molar mass	114.232 g·mol^{−1}
Appearance	Colourless liquid
Odor	Odourless
Density	719 mg mL^{−1}
Melting point	−110 °C (−166 °F; 163 K)
Boiling point	115 to 117 °C; 239 to 242 °F; 388 to 390 K
Henry's law constant (k_{H})	2.6 nmol Pa^{−1} kg^{−1}
Magnetic susceptibility (χ)	−98.77·10^{−6} cm^{3}/mol

Thermochemistry
Std enthalpy of formation (Δ_{f}H^{⦵}_{298})	−253.3 – −251.3 kJ mol^{−1}
Std enthalpy of combustion (Δ_{c}H^{⦵}_{298})	−5.4683 – −5.4665 MJ mol^{−1}

Related compounds
Related alkanes	Tetraethylmethane; 2,2,4-Trimethylpentane; 2,3,3-Trimethylpentane; 2,3,4-Trimethylpentane; Tetra-tert-butylmethane; 2,5-Dimethylhexane; Isocetane
- Except where otherwise noted, data are given for materials in their standard state (at 25 °C [77 °F], 100 kPa). verify (what is ?) Infobox references

2,3-Dimethylhexane is a structural isomer of octane.
