= 2,5-Dimethylhexane =

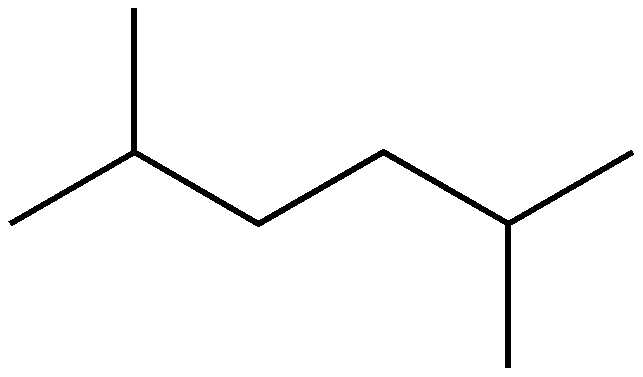
- Skeletal formula of 2,5-dimethylhexane

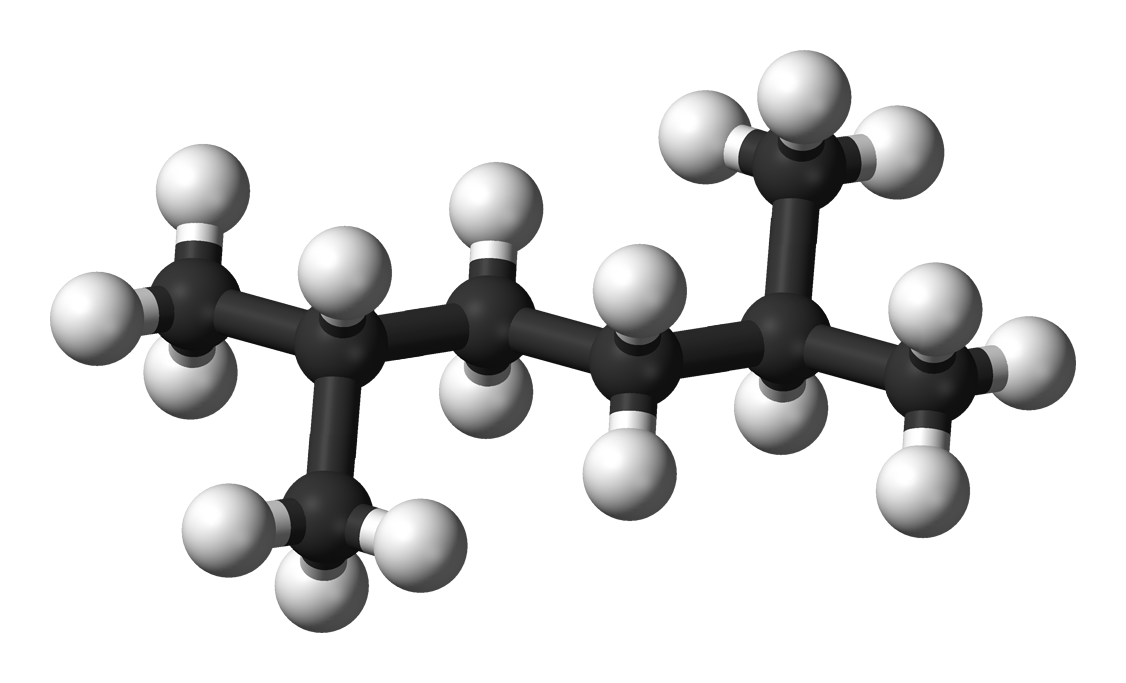
- Ball and stick model of 2,5-dimethylhexane

Names
- Preferred IUPAC name 2,5-Dimethylhexane

Identifiers
CAS Number	592-13-2
3D model (JSmol)	Interactive image
Beilstein Reference	1696877
ChemSpider	11104
ECHA InfoCard	100.008.861
EC Number	209-745-8
PubChem CID	11592
UNII	PCS13D63P8
UN number	3295
CompTox Dashboard (EPA)	DTXSID4073201
- InChI: InChI=1S/C8H18/c1-7(2)5-6-8(3)4/h7-8H,5-6H2,1-4H3 Key: UWNADWZGEHDQAB-UHFFFAOYSA-N
- SMILES: CC(C)CCC(C)C

Properties
Chemical formula	C_{8}H_{18}
Molar mass	114.232 g·mol^{−1}
Appearance	Colourless liquid
Odor	Odourless
Density	694 mg mL^{−1}
Melting point	−93 to −89 °C; −136 to −128 °F; 180 to 184 K
Boiling point	108.1 to 109.9 °C; 226.5 to 229.7 °F; 381.2 to 383.0 K
Vapor pressure	7.582 kPa (at 37.7 °C)
Henry's law constant (k_{H})	3.0 nmol Pa^{−1} kg^{−1}
Magnetic susceptibility (χ)	−98.15·10^{−6} cm^{3}/mol
Refractive index (n_{D})	1.392

Thermochemistry
Heat capacity (C)	249.20 J K^{−1} mol^{−1}
Std enthalpy of formation (Δ_{f}H^{⦵}_{298})	−262.0 – −259.0 kJ mol^{−1}
Std enthalpy of combustion (Δ_{c}H^{⦵}_{298})	−5.4615 – −5.4587 MJ mol^{−1}

Hazards
- GHS labelling
Pictograms	(GHS02: Flammable) (GHS07: Exclamation mark) (GHS08: Health hazard) (GHS09: Environmental hazard)
Signal word	Danger
Hazard statements	H225, H304, H315, H336, H410
Precautionary statements	P210, P261, P273, P301+P310, P331
Flash point	26 °C (79 °F; 299 K)
Explosive limits	0.98–?%

Related compounds
Related alkanes	Tetraethylmethane; 2,2,4-Trimethylpentane; 2,3,3-Trimethylpentane; 2,3,4-Trimethylpentane; Tetra-tert-butylmethane; 2,3-Dimethylhexane; Isocetane
- Except where otherwise noted, data are given for materials in their standard state (at 25 °C [77 °F], 100 kPa). verify (what is ?) Infobox references

2,5-Dimethylhexane is a branched alkane used in the aviation industry in low revolutions per minute helicopters. As an isomer of octane, the boiling point is very close to that of octane, but can in pure form be slightly lower. 2,5-Dimethylhexane is moderately toxic.
