= C11H10 =

The molecular formula C_{11}H_{10} may refer to:

- Methano[10]annulenes
  - 1,5-Methano[10]annulene
  - 1,6-Methano[10]annulene
- Methylazulenes
  - 1-Methylazulene
  - 2-Methylazulene
  - 4-Methylazulene
  - 5-Methylazulene
  - 6-Methylazulene
- Methylnaphthalenes
  - 1-Methylnaphthalene
  - 2-Methylnaphthalene
