= C16H34 =

The molecular formula C_{16}H_{34} (molar mass: 226.44 g/mol, exact mass: 226.2661 u) may refer to:

- Hexadecane (cetane)
- Isocetane
- 2-Methylpentadecane
