= Fuel oil =

Petroleum product burned to generate motive power or heat

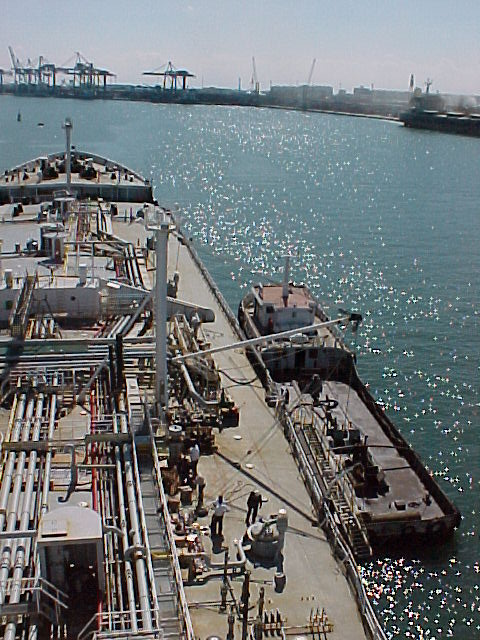
An oil tanker taking on fuel, or "bunkering"

Fuel oil is any of various fractions obtained from the distillation of petroleum (crude oil). Such oils include distillates (the lighter fractions) and residues (the heavier fractions). Fuel oils include heavy fuel oil (bunker fuel), marine fuel oil (MFO), furnace oil (FO), gas oil (gasoil), heating oils (such as home heating oil), diesel fuel, and others.

The term fuel oil generally includes any liquid fuel that is burned in a furnace or boiler to generate heat (heating oils), or used in an engine to generate power (as motor fuels). However, it does not usually include other liquid oils, such as those with a flash point of approximately 42 °C (108 °F), or oils burned in cotton- or wool-wick burners. In a stricter sense, fuel oil refers only to the heaviest commercial fuels that crude oil can yield, that is, those fuels heavier than gasoline (petrol) and naphtha.

Fuel oil consists of long-chain hydrocarbons, particularly alkanes, cycloalkanes, and aromatics. Small molecules, such as those in propane, naphtha, gasoline, and kerosene, have relatively low boiling points, and are removed at the start of the fractional distillation process. Heavier petroleum-derived oils like diesel fuel and lubricating oil are much less volatile and distill out more slowly.

== Uses ==
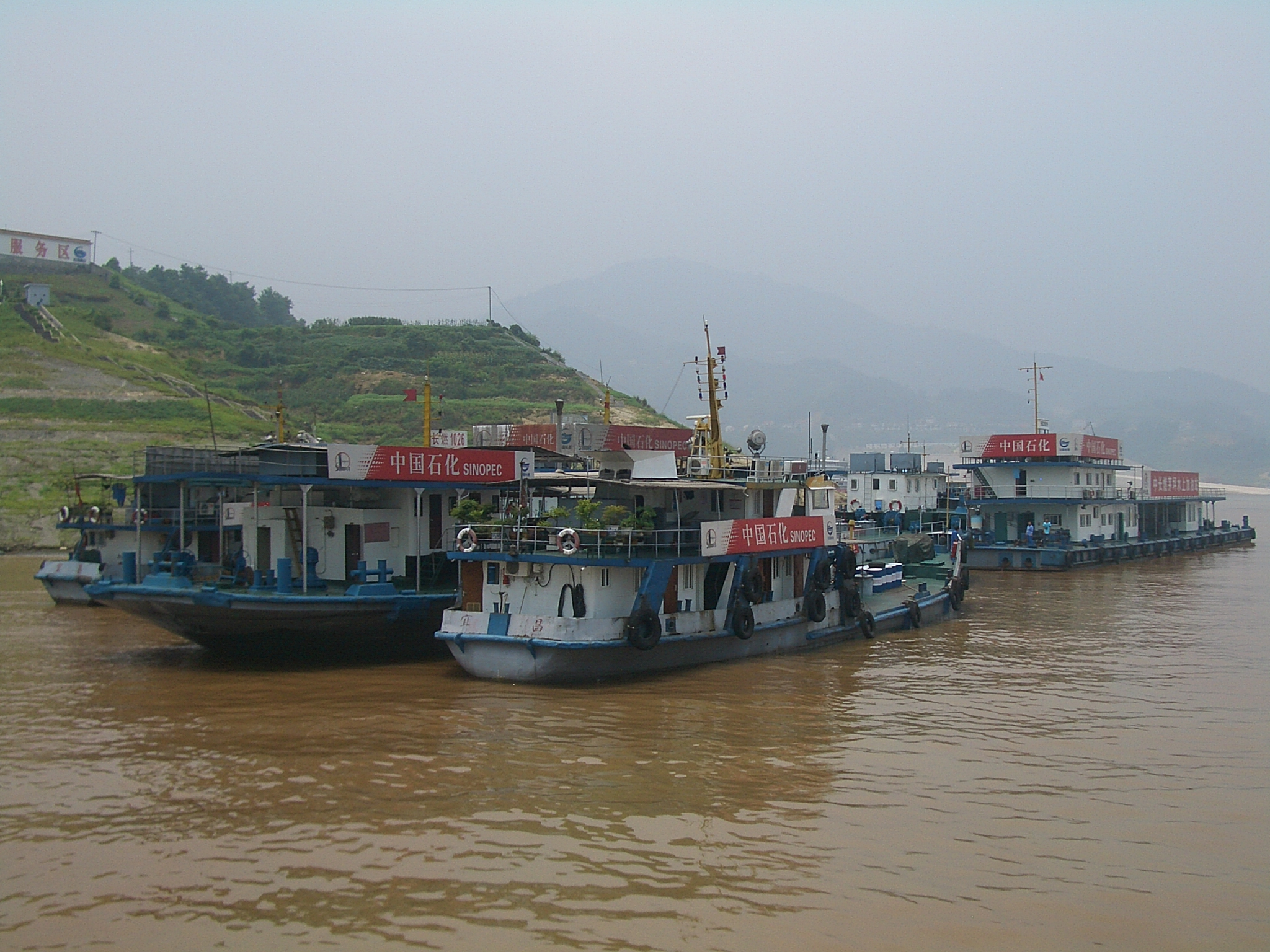
A fuel station in Zigui County on the Yangtze River

HAZMAT class 3 fuel oil

Oil has many uses; it heats homes and businesses and fuels trucks, ships and some cars. A small amount of electricity is produced by diesel, but it is more polluting and more expensive than natural gas. It is often used as a backup fuel for peaking power plants in case the supply of natural gas is interrupted or as the main fuel for small electrical generators. In Europe, the use of diesel is generally restricted to cars (about 40%), SUVs (about 90%), and trucks and buses (over 99%). The market for home heating using fuel oil has decreased due to the widespread penetration of natural gas as well as heat pumps. However, it is very common in some areas, such as the Northeastern United States.

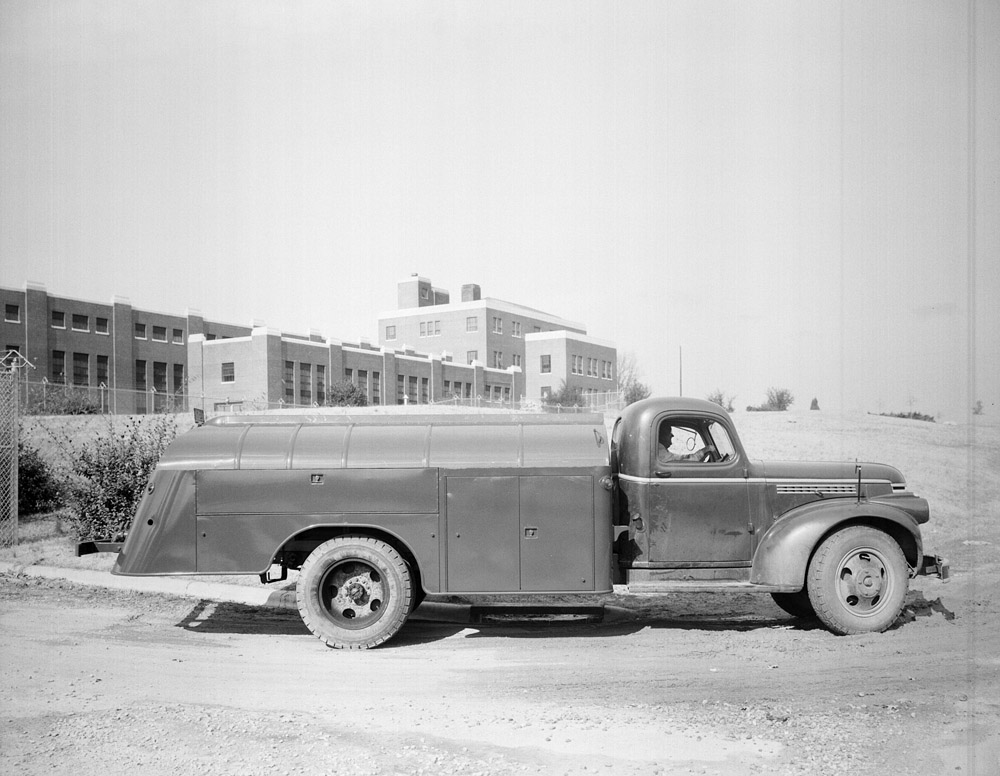
Fuel oil truck making a delivery in North Carolina, 1945

Residual fuel oil (also known as heavy fuel oil) is less useful because it is so viscous that it has to be heated with a special heating system before use and it may contain relatively high amounts of pollutants, particularly sulfur, which forms sulfur dioxide upon combustion. However, its undesirable properties make it very cheap. In fact, it is the cheapest liquid fuel available. Since it requires heating before use, residual fuel oil cannot be used in road vehicles, boats or small ships, as the heating equipment takes up valuable space and makes the vehicle heavier. Heating the oil is also a delicate procedure, which is impractical on small, fast moving vehicles. However, power plants and large ships are able to use residual fuel oil.

Use of residual fuel oil was more common in the past. It powered boilers, railroad steam locomotives, and steamships. Locomotives, however, have become powered by diesel or electric power; steamships are not as common as they were previously due to their higher operating costs (most LNG carriers use steam plants, as "boil-off" gas emitted from the cargo can be used as a fuel source); and most boilers now use heating oil or natural gas. Some industrial boilers still use it and so do some old buildings, including in New York City. In 2011 New York City estimated that the 1% of its buildings that burned fuel oils No. 4 and No. 6 were responsible for 86% of the soot pollution generated by all buildings in the city. New York made the phase out of these fuel grades part of its environmental plan, PlaNYC, because of concerns for the health effects caused by fine particulates, and all buildings using fuel oil No. 6 had been converted to less polluting fuel by the end of 2015.

Residual fuel's use in electrical generation has also decreased. In 1973, residual fuel oil produced 16.8% of the electricity in the US. By 1983, it had fallen to 6.2%, and as of 2005, electricity production from all forms of petroleum, including diesel and residual fuel, is only 3% of total production. The decline is the result of price competition with natural gas and environmental restrictions on emissions. For power plants, the costs of heating the oil, extra pollution control and additional maintenance required after burning it often outweigh the low cost of the fuel. Burning fuel oil, particularly residual fuel oil, produces uniformly higher carbon dioxide emissions than natural gas.

Heavy fuel oils continue to be used in the boiler "lighting up" facility in many coal-fired power plants. This use is approximately analogous to using kindling to start a fire. Without performing this act it is difficult to begin the large-scale combustion process.

The chief drawback to residual fuel oil is its high initial viscosity, particularly in the case of No. 6 oil, which requires a correctly engineered system for storage, pumping, and burning. Though it is still usually lighter than water (with a specific gravity usually ranging from 0.95 to 1.03) it is much heavier and more viscous than No. 2 oil, kerosene, or gasoline. No. 6 oil must, in fact, be stored at around 38 °C (100 °F) heated to 65–120 °C (149–248 °F) before it can be easily pumped, and in cooler temperatures it can congeal into a tarry semisolid. The flash point of most blends of No. 6 oil is, incidentally, about 65 °C (149 °F). Attempting to pump high-viscosity oil at low temperatures was a frequent cause of damage to fuel lines, furnaces, and related equipment which were often designed for lighter fuels.

For comparison, BS 2869 Class G heavy fuel oil behaves in similar fashion, requiring storage at 40 °C (104 °F), pumping at around 50 °C (122 °F) and finalizing for burning at around 90–120 °C (194–248 °F).

Most of the facilities which historically burned No. 6 or other residual oils were industrial plants and similar facilities constructed in the early or mid 20th century, or which had switched from coal to oil fuel during the same time period. In either case, residual oil was seen as a good prospect because it was cheap and readily available. Most of these facilities have subsequently been closed and demolished, or have replaced their fuel supplies with a simpler one such as gas or No. 2 oil. The high sulfur content of No. 6 oil—up to 3.5% by weight in some extreme cases—had a corrosive effect on many heating systems (which were usually designed without adequate corrosion protection in mind), shortening their lifespans and increasing the polluting effects. This was particularly the case in furnaces that were regularly shut down and allowed to go cold, because the internal condensation produced sulfuric acid.

Environmental cleanups at such facilities are frequently complicated by the use of asbestos insulation on the fuel feed lines. No. 6 oil is very persistent, and does not degrade rapidly. Its viscosity and stickiness also make remediation of underground contamination very difficult, since these properties reduce the effectiveness of methods such as air stripping.

When released into water, such as a river or ocean, residual oil tends to break up into patches or tarballs – mixtures of oil and particulate matter such as silt and floating organic matter – rather than form a single slick. An average of about 5-10% of the material will evaporate within hours of the release, primarily the lighter hydrocarbon fractions. The remainder will then often sink to the bottom of the water column.

== Health effects ==
Because of the low quality of bunker fuel, when burnt it is especially harmful to the health of humans, causing serious illnesses and deaths. Prior to the IMO's 2020 sulfur cap, shipping industry air pollution was estimated to cause around 400,000 premature deaths each year, from lung cancer and cardiovascular disease, as well as 14 million childhood asthma cases each year.

Even after the introduction of cleaner fuel rules in 2020, shipping air pollution is still estimated to account for around 250,000 deaths each year, and around 6.4 million childhood asthma cases each year.

The hardest-hit countries by air pollution from ships are China, Japan, the UK, Indonesia, and Germany. In 2015, shipping air pollution killed an estimated 20,520 people in China, 4,019 people in Japan, and 3,192 people in the UK.

According to an ICCT study, countries located on major shipping lanes are particularly exposed, and can see shipping account for a high percentage of overall deaths from transport sector air pollution. In Taiwan, shipping accounts for 70% of all transport-attributable air pollution deaths in 2015, followed by Morocco at 51%, Malaysia and Japan both at 41%, Vietnam at 39%, and the UK at 38%.

As well as commercial shipping, cruise ships also emit large amounts of air pollution, damaging people's health. Up to 2019, it was reported that the ships of the single largest cruise company, Carnival Corporation & plc, emitted ten times more sulfur dioxide than all of Europe's cars combined.

== General classification ==
=== United States ===
Although the following trends generally hold true, different organizations may have different numerical specifications for the six fuel grades. The boiling point and carbon chain length of the fuel increases with fuel oil number. Viscosity also increases with number, and the heaviest oil must be heated for it to flow. Price usually decreases as the fuel number increases.

Number 1 fuel oil is a volatile distillate oil intended for vaporizing pot-type burners and high-performance/clean diesel engines. It is the kerosene refinery cut that boils off immediately after the heavy naphtha cut used for gasoline. This fuel is commonly known as diesel no. 1, kerosene, and jet fuel. Former names include: coal oil, stove oil, and range oil.

Number 2 fuel oil is a distillate home heating oil. Trucks and some cars use similar diesel no. 2 with a cetane number limit describing the ignition quality of the fuel. Both are typically obtained from the light gas oil cut. The name gasoil refers to the original use of this fraction in the late 19th and early 20th centuries—the gas oil cut was used as an enriching agent for carbureted water gas manufacture.

Number 3 fuel oil was a distillate oil for burners requiring low-viscosity fuel. ASTM merged this grade into the number 2 specification, and the term has been rarely used since the mid-20th century.

Number 4 fuel oil is a commercial heating oil for burner installations not equipped with preheaters. It may be obtained from the heavy gas oil cut. This fuel is sometimes known by the Navy specification of Bunker A.

Number 5 fuel oil is a residual-type industrial heating oil requiring preheating to 77–104 °C (171–219 °F) for proper atomization at the burners. It may be obtained from the heavy gas oil cut, or it may be a blend of residual oil with enough number 2 oil to adjust viscosity until it can be pumped without preheating. This fuel is sometimes known by the Navy specification of Bunker B.

Number 6 fuel oil is a high-viscosity residual oil requiring preheating to 104–127 °C (219–261 °F). Residual means the material remaining after the more valuable cuts of crude oil have boiled off. The residue may contain various undesirable impurities, including 2% water and 0.5% mineral oil. This fuel may be known as residual fuel oil (RFO), by the Navy specification of Bunker C, or by the Pacific Specification of PS-400.

=== United Kingdom ===
The British Standard BS 2869, Fuel Oils for Agricultural, Domestic and Industrial Engines, specifies the following fuel oil classes:

Fuel oil classes per BS 2869
Class	Type	Min. kinematic viscosity	Max. kinematic viscosity	Min. flash point	Max. sulfur content	Alias
C1	Distillate	—	—	43 °C	0.040 % (m/m)	Paraffin
C2	Distillate	1.000 mm^{2}/s at 40 °C	2.000 mm^{2}/s at 40 °C	38 °C	0.100 % (m/m)	Kerosene, 28-second oil
A2	Distillate	2.000 mm^{2}/s at 40 °C	5.000 mm^{2}/s at 40 °C	> 55 °C	0.001 % (m/m)	low-sulfur gas oil, ULSD
D	Distillate	2.000 mm^{2}/s at 40 °C	5.000 mm^{2}/s at 40 °C	> 55 °C	0.100 % (m/m)	Gas oil, red diesel, 35-second oil
E	Residual	—	8.200 mm^{2}/s at 100 °C	66 °C	1.000 % (m/m)	Light fuel oil, LFO, 250-second oil
F	Residual	8.201 mm^{2}/s at 100 °C	20.000 mm^{2}/s at 100 °C	66 °C	1.000 % (m/m)	Medium fuel oil, MFO, 1000-second oil
G	Residual	20.010 mm^{2}/s at 100 °C	40.000 mm^{2}/s at 100 °C	66 °C	1.000 % (m/m)	Heavy fuel oil, HFO, 3500-second oil
H	Residual	40.010 mm^{2}/s at 100 °C	56.000 mm^{2}/s at 100 °C	66 °C	1.000 % (m/m)	—

Class C1 and C2 fuels are kerosene-type fuels. C1 is for use in flueless appliances (e.g. lamps). C2 is for vaporizing or atomizing burners in appliances connected to flues.

Class A2 fuel is suitable for mobile, off-road applications that are required to use a sulfur-free fuel. Class D fuel is similar to Class A2 and is suitable for use in stationary applications, such as domestic, commercial, and industrial heating. The BS 2869 standard permits Class A2 and Class D fuel to contain up to 7% (V/V) biodiesel (fatty acid methyl ester, FAME), provided the FAME content meets the requirements of the BS EN 14214 standard.

Classes E to H are residual oils for atomizing burners serving boilers or, with the exception of Class H, certain types of larger combustion engines. Classes F to H invariably require heating prior to use; Class E fuel may require preheating, depending on ambient conditions.

=== Russia ===
Mazut is a residual fuel oil often derived from Russian petroleum sources and is either blended with lighter petroleum fractions or burned directly in specialized boilers and furnaces. It is also used as a petrochemical feedstock. In the Russian practice, though, "mazut" is an umbrella term roughly synonymous with the fuel oil in general, that covers most of the types mentioned above, except US grades 1 and 2/3, for which separate terms exist (kerosene and diesel fuel/solar oil respectively — Russian practice doesn't differentiate between diesel fuel and heating oil). This is further separated in two grades, "naval mazut" being analogous to US grades 4 and 5, and "furnace mazut", a heaviest residual fraction of the crude, almost exactly corresponding to US Number 6 fuel oil and further graded by viscosity and sulfur content.

== Maritime fuel classification ==
In the maritime field another type of classification is used for fuel oils:

Name	Description	Equivalent in US classification
MGO (Marine gasoil)	Made from distillate only	Roughly, no. 2 fuel oil
MDO (Marine diesel oil)	A blend of heavy gasoil that may contain very small amounts of black refinery feed stocks, but has a low viscosity up to 12 cSt so it need not be heated for use in internal combustion engines. Marine diesel oil contains some heavy fuel oil, unlike regular diesels.	Roughly, no. 3 fuel oil
IFO (Intermediate fuel oil)	A blend of gasoil and heavy fuel oil, with less gasoil than marine diesel oil	Roughly, no. 4 fuel oil
HFO (Heavy fuel oil)	pure or nearly pure residual oil	Roughly, no. 5 and no. 6 fuel oil
NSFO (Navy special fuel oil)		No. 5 HFO
MFO (Marine fuel oil)		No. 6 HFO

=== Standards and classification ===
CCAI and CII are two indexes which describe the ignition quality of residual fuel oil, and CCAI is especially often calculated for marine fuels. Despite this, marine fuels are still quoted on the international bunker markets with their maximum viscosity (which is set by the ISO 8217 standard – see below) due to the fact that marine engines are designed to use different viscosities of fuel. The unit of viscosity used is the centistoke (cSt) and the fuels most frequently quoted are listed below in order of cost, the least expensive first.

- IFO 380 – Intermediate fuel oil with a maximum viscosity of 380 cSt (<3.5% sulfur)
- IFO 180 – Intermediate fuel oil with a maximum viscosity of 180 cSt (<3.5% sulfur)
- LS 380 – Low-sulfur (<1.0%) intermediate fuel oil with a maximum viscosity of 380 cSt
- LS 180 – Low-sulfur (<1.0%) intermediate fuel oil with a maximum viscosity of 180 cSt
- MDO – Marine diesel oil
- MGO – Marine gas oil
- LSMGO – Low-sulfur (<0.1%) Marine Gas Oil – The fuel is to be used in EU Ports and Anchorages. EU Sulfur directive 2005/33/EC
- ULSMGO – Ultra-Low-Sulfur Marine Gas Oil – referred to as Ultra-Low-Sulfur Diesel (sulfur 0.0015% max) in the US and Auto Gas Oil (sulfur 0.001% max) in the EU. Maximum sulfur allowable in US territories and territorial waters (inland, marine, and automotive) and in the EU for inland use.

The density is also an important parameter for fuel oils since marine fuels are purified before use to remove water and dirt from the oil. Since the purifiers use centrifugal force, the oil must have a density which is sufficiently different from water. Older purifiers work with a fuel having a maximum of 991 kg/m3; with modern purifiers it is also possible to purify oil with a density of 1010 kg/m3.

The first British standard for fuel oil came in 1982. The latest standard is ISO 8217 issued in 2017. The ISO standard describe four qualities of distillate fuels and 10 qualities of residual fuels. Over the years the standards have become stricter on environmentally important parameters such as sulfur content. The latest standard also banned the adding of used lubricating oil (ULO).

Some parameters of marine fuel oils according to ISO 8217 (3. ed 2005):

Marine distillate fuels
Parameter	Unit	Limit	DMX	DMA	DMB	DMC
Density at 15 °C	kg/m^{3}	Max	-	890.0	900.0	920.0
Viscosity at 40 °C	mm^{2}/s	Max	5.5	6.0	11.0	14.0
	mm^{2}/s	Min	1.4	1.5	-	-
Water	% V/V	Max	-	-	0.3	0.3
Sulfur^{1}	% (m/m)	Max	1.0	1.5	2.0	2.0
Aluminium + Silicon^{2}	mg/kg	Max	-	-	-	25
Flash point^{3}	°C	Min	43	60	60	60
Pour point, Summer	°C	Max	-	0	6	6
Pour point, Winter	°C	Max	-	-6	0	0
Cloud point	°C	Max	-16	-	-	-
Calculated Cetane Index		Min	45	40	35	-

Marine residual fuels
Parameter	Unit	Limit	RMA 30	RMB 30	RMD 80	RME 180	RMF 180	RMG 380	RMH 380	RMK 380	RMH 700	RMK 700
Density at 15 °C	kg/m^{3}	Max	960.0	975.0	980.0	991.0	991.0	991.0	991.0	1010.0	991.0	1010.0
Viscosity at 50 °C	mm^{2}/s	Max	30.0	30.0	80.0	180.0	180.0	380.0	380.0	380.0	700.0	700.0
Water	% V/V	Max	0.5	0.5	0.5	0.5	0.5	0.5	0.5	0.5	0.5	0.5
Sulfur^{1}	% (m/m)	Max	3.5	3.5	3.5	3.5	3.5	3.5	3.5	3.5	3.5	3.5
Aluminium + Silicon^{2}	mg/kg	Max	80	80	80	80	80	80	80	80	80	80
Flash point^{3}	°C	Min	60	60	60	60	60	60	60	60	60	60
Pour point, Summer	°C	Max	6	24	30	30	30	30	30	30	30	30
Pour point, Winter	°C	Max	0	24	30	30	30	30	30	30	30	30

1. Maximum sulfur content in the open ocean is 0.5% since January 2020. Maximum sulfur content in designated areas is 0.1% since 1 January 2015. Before then it was 1.00%.
2. The content of aluminum and silicon is limited because those metals are dangerous for the engine. Those elements are present because some components of the fuel are manufactured with Fluid Catalytic Cracking process, which makes use of catalyst containing aluminum and silicon.
3. The flash point of all fuels used in the engine room should be at least 60 °C. (DMX is used for things like emergency generators and not normally used in the engine room. Gaseous fuels such as LPG/LNG have special class rules applied to the fuel systems.)

=== Bunker fuel ===
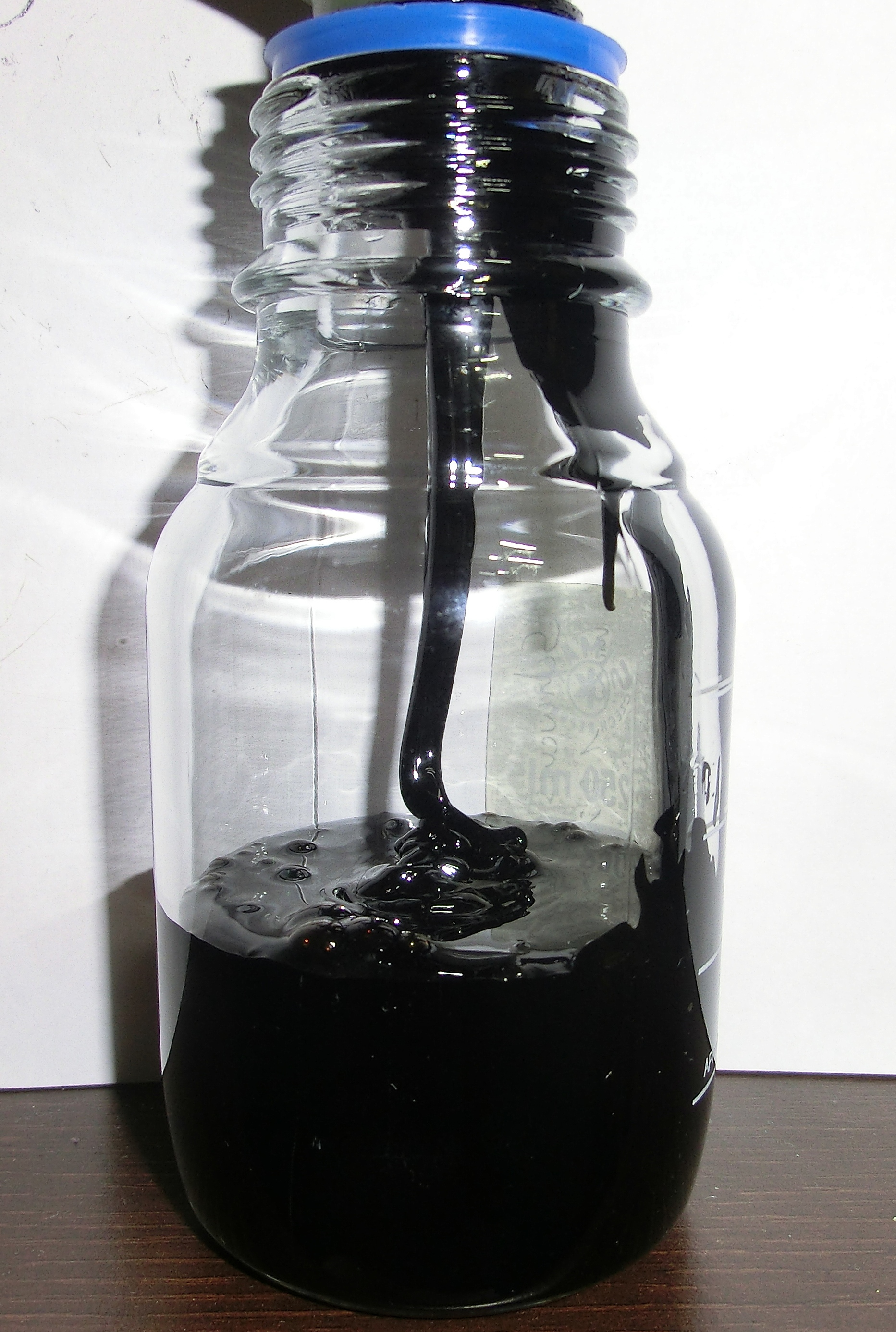
A sample of residual fuel oil

Bunker fuel or bunker crude is technically any type of fuel oil used aboard water vessels. Its name is derived from coal bunkers, where the fuel was originally stored. In 2019, large ships consumed 213 million metric tons of bunker fuel. The Australian Customs and the Australian Tax Office defines a bunker fuel as the fuel that powers the engine of a ship or aircraft.

Bunker A is No. 4 fuel oil, bunker B is No. 5, and bunker C is No. 6. Since No. 6 is the most common, "bunker fuel" is often used as a synonym for No. 6. No. 5 fuel oil is also called Navy Special Fuel Oil (NSFO) or just navy special; No. 5 or 6 are also commonly called heavy fuel oil (HFO) or furnace fuel oil (FFO); the high viscosity requires heating, usually by a recirculated low pressure steam system, before the oil can be pumped from a bunker tank. Bunkers are rarely labeled this way in modern maritime practice.

Since the 1980s the International Organization for Standardization (ISO) has been the accepted standard for marine fuels (bunkers). The standard is listed under number 8217, with recent updates in 2017 and 2024. The latest edition of bunker fuel specification is ISO 8217: 2024. The standard divides fuels into residual and distillate fuels. The most common residual fuels in the shipping industry are RMG and RMK. The differences between the two are mainly the density and viscosity, with RMG generally being delivered at 380 centistokes or less, and RMK at 700 centistokes or less. Ships with more advanced engines can process heavier, more viscous, and thus cheaper, fuel. Governing bodies around the world, e.g., California, European Union, have established Emission Control Areas (ECA) that limit the maximum sulfur of fuels burned in their ports to limit pollution, reducing the percentage of sulfur and other particulates from 4.5% m/m to as little as 0.10% as of 2015 inside an ECA. As of 2013 3.5% continued to be permitted outside an ECA, but the International Maritime Organization has lowered the sulfur content requirement outside the ECAs to 0.5% m/m as of 2020. This is where Marine Distillate Fuels and other alternatives to use of heavy bunker fuel come into play. They have similar properties to diesel #2, which is used as road diesel around the world. The most common grades used in shipping are DMA and DMB. Greenhouse gas emissions resulting from the use of international bunker fuels are currently included in national inventories.

Table of fuel oils
Name	Alias	Alias	Alias	Alias	Alias	Type	Chain length
No. 1 fuel oil	No. 1 distillate	No. 1 diesel fuel	Kerosene	Jet fuel		Distillate	9–16
No. 2 fuel oil	No. 2 distillate	No. 2 diesel fuel	Road diesel	Rail diesel	Marine gas oil	Distillate	10–20
No. 3 fuel oil	No. 3 distillate	No. 3 diesel fuel	Marine diesel oil			Distillate	
No. 4 fuel oil	No. 4 distillate	No. 4 residual fuel oil	Bunker A	Intermediate fuel oil		Distillate/Residual	12–70
No. 5 fuel oil	No. 5 residual fuel oil	Heavy fuel oil	Bunker B	Navy special fuel oil	Furnace fuel oil	Residual	12–70
No. 6 fuel oil	No. 6 residual fuel oil	Heavy fuel oil	Bunker C	Marine fuel oil	Furnace fuel oil	Residual	20–70

Heavy fuel oil is still the primary fuel for cruise ships, a tourism sector that is associated with a clean and friendly image. In stark contrast, the exhaust gas emissions – due to HFO's high sulfur content – result in an eco balance significantly worse than that for individual mobility.

== Bunkering ==
The term "bunkering" broadly relates to storage of petroleum products in tanks (among other, disparate meanings). The precise meaning can be further specialized depending on context. Perhaps the most common, more specialized usage refers to the practice and business of refueling ships. Bunkering operations are located at seaports, and they include the storage of bunker (ship) fuels and the provision of the fuel to vessels.

Alternatively "bunkering" may apply to the shipboard logistics of loading fuel and distributing it among available bunkers (on-board fuel tanks).

Finally, in the context of the oil industry in Nigeria, bunkering has come to refer to the illegal diversion of crude oil (often subsequently refined in makeshift facilities into lighter transportation fuels) by the unauthorized cutting of holes into transport pipelines, often by very crude and hazardous means and causing spills.

As of 2018, some 300 million metric tons of fuel oil are used for ship bunkering. On 1 January 2020, regulations set by the International Marine Organization (IMO) all marine shipping vessels will require the use of very low sulfur fuel oil (0.5% Sulfur) or to install exhaust gas scrubber systems to remove the excess sulfur dioxide. The emissions from ships have generally been controlled by the following sulfur caps on any fuel oil used on board: 3.50% on and after 1 January 2012 and 0.50% on and after 1 January 2020. Further removal of sulfur translates to additional energy and capital costs and can impact fuel price and availability. If priced correctly the excess cheap yet dirty fuel would find its way into other markets, including displacing some onshore energy production in nations with low environmental protection .

== Transportation ==
Fuel oil is transported worldwide by fleets of oil tankers making deliveries to suitably sized strategic ports such as Houston, US; Singapore; Fujairah, United Arab Emirates; Balboa, Panama, Cristobal, Panama; Sakha, Egypt; Algeciras, Spain and Rotterdam, Netherlands. Where a convenient seaport does not exist, inland transport may be achieved with the use of barges. Lighter fuel oils can also be transported through pipelines. The major physical supply chains of Europe are along the Rhine River.

== Environmental issues ==
Emissions from bunker fuel burning in ships contribute to climate change and to air pollution levels in many port cities, especially where the emissions from industry and road traffic have been controlled. The switch of auxiliary engines from heavy fuel oil to diesel oil at berth can result in large emission reductions, especially for SO_{2} and PM. CO_{2} emissions from bunker fuels sold are not added to national GHG emissions. For small countries with large international ports, there is an important difference between the emissions in territorial waters and the total emissions of the fuel sold. At the 1997 Third Conference of the Parties in Kyoto, Japan, countries agreed to exempt bunker fuels, and multilateral military operations, from national emissions totals after insistence from the U.S. climate change delegation for such exemptions.

The emissions from conventional fuel oil in maritime transport has led to a rise in alternative fuels for ship engines and power, including the use of LNG, Ammonia and methanol, among others. Fuel oil usage in ships is expected to decline as a result of the use of alternative fuels following amendments to the MARPOL Convention.

== See also ==
- Coconut oil – Edible oil derived from coconut: an important fuel for ships in regions such as the Philippines, Papua New Guinea, and Vanuatu
- Diesel fuel – Liquid fuel used in diesel engines
- Fuel-management systems – Integrated system to monitor, control, and report on fuel consumption
- Fuel price risk management – Strategies used to reduce financial exposure to fuel-price volatility
- Gas oil separation plant
- Gasoline – Liquid fuel derived from petroleum
- Heating oil – Liquid petroleum product used as a fuel oil for furnaces or boilers
- Hot-bulb engine – Internal combustion engine
- Jet fuel – Type of aviation fuel
- Kerosene – Combustible hydrocarbon liquid
- Lubricant – Substance introduced to reduce friction between surfaces in mutual contact
- Marine fuel management – Strategy of fuel management
- Petroleum naphtha – Petroleum product
- OW Bunker test case
- Pyrolysis oil – Petroleum substitute
- Heavy fuel oil – Fuel oils of a tar-like consistency
