= CCAI =

CCAI is an acronym that can refer to:

- Climate Change Artificial Intelligence, an initiative of data scientists to help resolve the ongoing issue of climate change
- Calculated Carbon Aromaticity Index, an index to calculate the ignition quality of residual fuel oil
- Congressional Coalition on Adoption, an American organization supporting children in need of a family
- Consumer Confidence Average Index, an indicator of American consumers confidence
- Computer Controlled Acoustic Instruments pt2, an album from Aphex Twin.
