= Methylnaphthalene =

Methylnaphthalene may refer to:

- 1-Methylnaphthalene
- 2-Methylnaphthalene
