= Methano(10)annulene =

Methano(10)annulene may refer to:

- 1,5-Methano(10)annulene
- 1,6-Methano(10)annulene
