= Cetane index =

Cetane index is used as a substitute for the cetane number of diesel fuel. The cetane index is calculated based on the fuel's density and distillation range (ASTM D86). There are two methods used, ASTM D976 and D4737. The older D976, or "two-variable equation" is outdated and should no longer be used for cetane number estimation. It is, however, still required by the United States Environmental Protection Agency (EPA) as an alternative method for satisfying its aromaticity requirement for diesel fuel. D4737 is the newest method and is sometimes referred to as "the four-variable equation". D4737 is the same method as ISO 4264. Cetane index in some crude oil assays is often referred to as Cetane calcule, while the cetane number is referred to as Cetane measure.

== Cetane improver additives ==
Cetane index calculations can not account for cetane improver additives and therefore do not measure total cetane number for additized diesel fuels. Diesel engine operation is primarily related to the actual cetane number, and the cetane index is simply an estimation of the base (unadditized) cetane number. Cetane number should equal or exceed cetane index, depending on the amount of additive used. The most common additive is 2-ethylhexyl nitrate (2EHN).

== See also ==
- Cetane
- Octane rating
