= Porsche-Diesel 419 =

Tractor by Porsche-Diesel Motorenbau

Porsche-Diesel Master 419
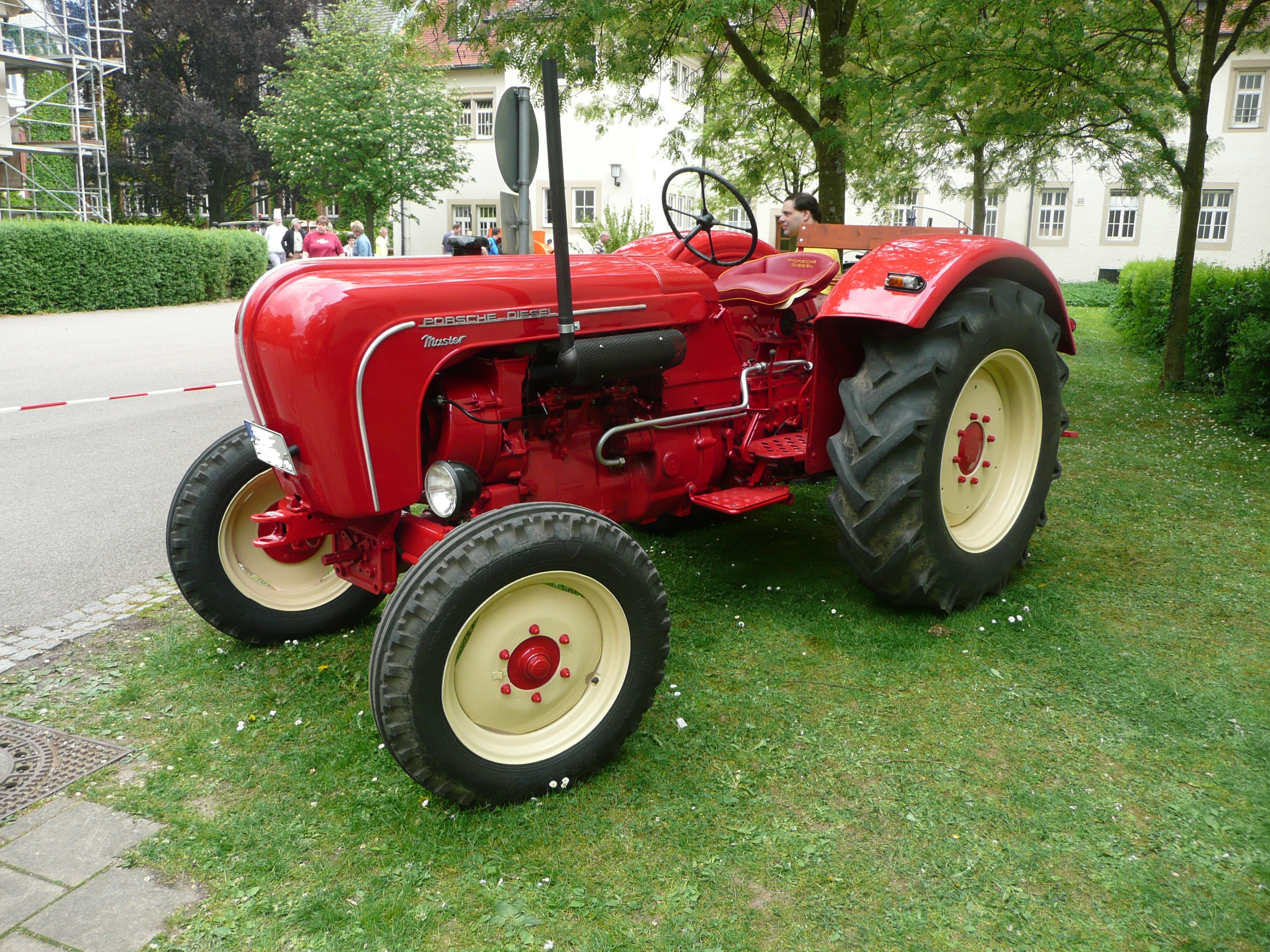
- Porsche-Diesel 419
- Type: Agricultural tractor
- Manufacturer: Porsche-Diesel Motorenbau GmbH
- Production: 1960–1963
- Length: 3380 mm
- Width: 1826 mm
- Height: 1637 mm
- Weight: 2100 kg
- Propulsion: Diesel engine
- Engine model: Porsche F 419 (Diesel, 3500 cm³)
- Flywheel power: 50 PS (37 kW)
- Speed: 19.4 km/h
- Preceded by: Porsche-Diesel 418

The Porsche-Diesel 419 is an agricultural tractor made by Porsche-Diesel Motorenbau, and part of Porsche's Master series. It was the biggest and most powerful series-production tractor ever sold under the Porsche brand. In total, 1175 units were produced from 1960 until 1963. The 419 was preceded by the 418, and had no successor, since Porsche-Diesel Motorenbau stopped producing tractors in 1963. That same year, the catalogue price for a Porsche-Diesel 419 was DM 15,290.

== Description ==
The Porsche-Diesel 419 is a wheeled tractor and has no frame, instead, the rear axle is directly flange-mounted to the gearbox which itself is directly flange-mounted to the engine. The front axle is a dead portal axle, the rear axle is a live portal axle. On its front wheels, the 419 has 6–20 in tyres, on its rear wheels, it has 13–30 in tyres. 6–19 in or 7.5–16 in front tyres, as well as 11–36 in were offered as factory options. The rear axle has a locking differential in order to transfer different amounts of torque to the rear wheels. The 419 has a fully mechanical, foot-operated braking system with rear drum brakes, and no brakes on the front wheels. The brakes can be actuated separately to reduce the tractor's turning circle.

Porsche-Diesel Motorenbau equipped the 419 with an air-cooled Porsche F 419 diesel engine that produces 50 PS (37 kW). The Porsche F 419 is a naturally-aspirated, swirl-chamber injected four-stroke straight-four engine with a bore of 98 mm, and a stroke of 116 mm; the displacement is 3500 cm³. It has five crankshaft bearings and a gear-driven camshaft that actuates the overhead valves (two per cylinder) with pushrods and rocker arms. Each cylinder is fitted with a single crossflow cylinder head. For lubrication, the engine has a conventional wet-sump system. The cooling fan is thermostat-controlled.

The engine torque is sent to the gearbox with a dry double-disc clutch. Porsche-Diesel Motorenbau used a four-speed constant-mesh gearbox with three ranges (type ZF A 216) for the Porsche-Diesel 419. It has straight-cut gears and is not synchronised. The first and second range are forward ranges, the third range is the reverse range. In total, the 419 has 8 forward, and 4 reverse gears. With the factory tyres, the top speed in the highest forward gear is 19.4 km/h. Porsche also offered a high-geared version of this gearbox which allows a top speed of 27.4 km/h. In addition to this factory option, Porsche also offered a three-point linkage. For powering additional equipment, the 419 has a gearbox-dependent power take-off shaft and an engine power take-off shaft in back, as well as an engine power take-off shaft below the front coupling device.

== Technical specifications ==
- Length: 3380 mm
- Width: 1826 mm
- Height: 1637 mm
- Wheelbase: 2166 mm
- Ground clearance: 400 mm
- Tyres (front/rear): 6–20/13–30 in
- Mass: 2100 kg
- Max. permissible mass: 3850 kg
- Top speed: 19.4 km/h
- Fuel tank: 46 or 60 l
- Gearbox:
  - Type designation: ZF A 216
  - Type: Constant-mesh gearbox
  - Gears: 4
  - Forward ranges: 2
  - Reverse ranges: 1
- Engine:
  - Type designation: Porsche F 419
  - Type: Straight four-cylinder engine
  - Operating principle: Diesel
  - Fuel system: Swirl-chamber injection
  - Fuel type: ≥44 CN
  - Bore × stroke: 98 × 116 mm
  - Displacement: 3500 cm^{3}
  - Rated power (DIN 70020): 50 PS (37 kW) at 2100 min^{−1}
- Rear engine PTO speed: 579 min^{−1} or 1135 min^{−1}
- Front engine PTO speed: 1050 min^{−1}
