= Cetane improver =

Type of chemical

A cetane improver [′sē‚tān im′prüv·ər] is a chemical which has the effect of increasing a diesel fuel's cetane number. A few examples are nitrates, nitroalkanes, nitrocarbonates and peroxides.

One of the main cetane improver additives manufactured today is 2-ethylhexyl nitrate (CAS n°: 27247-96-7) which starts to decompose at 130 °C. 2-ethylhexyl nitrate is the result of the reaction of 2-ethylhexanol and nitric acid.

== Workings ==
Due to its chemical composition, a cetane improver additive has the faculty to decompose itself at lower temperature than diesel fuel. The additive’s exothermic decomposition leads to successive fuel reactions that result in the start of the combustion at low temperature.

Effects of Cetane Improver on Ignition Delay

The effect of the additive varies with the fuel type, which itself depends on the quality of the crude oil and the way it is refined.

== Regulations ==
Diesel fuel is a fraction of a crude, mixed with several additives, compliant with various environmental constraints, in order to be commercialized and added into engines.

With the rise of environmental concerns, the fuel industry has been driven to lessen emissions and increase performance. Europe, for instance, has implemented a minimum cetane Index (46) and cetane number (51) in its diesel specification (EN590)

emission standard	at latest	sulphur content	cetane number
Euro 1	1. January 1993	max. 2000 ppm	min. 49
Euro 2	1. January 1996	max. 500 ppm	min. 49
Euro 3	1. January 2001	max. 350 ppm	min. 51
Euro 4	1. January 2006	max. 50 ppm	min. 51
Euro 5	1. January 2009	max. 10 ppm	min. 51

== Uses ==
The crudes used by the refineries are more and more difficult to refine. This results in a Diesel fuel of lower ignition quality.

The use of cetane improver additives constitutes both a cost-effective and convenient way to reduce emissions and improve engine performance.

Refiners also use cetane improver additives in their premium diesel fuel for enhanced performances.

While gasoline needs a spark to be ignited, diesel fuel requires only the combination of the right pressure and temperature to start the combustion, with no outside assistance. The cetane number is a key property of diesel fuel, as it measures its aptitude to self-ignite in the combustion chamber.

The auto ignition temperature of diesel fuel is around 220 °C (428 °F) at atmospheric pressure. Cetane improver additives are used to decrease this temperature and lead to quicker combustion, by increasing the cetane number.

== Advantages ==
By reducing ignition time, cetane improver additives affect engine emissions, and guarantee:

- Lower fuel consumption: as the fuel takes longer to burn completely, less fuel needs to be injected for the same performance
- Quicker start-up with less smoke: easier and faster combustion affects smoke emissions, especially on the long term
- Better cold start: fuel ignites more easily
- Less engine knock and noise: as the fuel is quick to ignite, it also burns longer, which allows the pressure to rise more smoothly in the chamber
- Wear reduction: better combustion leads to minimum deposits and lower engine wear

They offer greater flexibility to refiners to improve diesel fuel quality while maximizing refinery yields.

== Test methods ==
The industry standards for measuring cetane number are ASTM D-613 (ISO 5165) for the Cooperative Fuel Research (CFR) engine, D-6890 for the Ignition Quality Tester (IQT), the D-7170 for the Fuel Ignition Tester (FIT) and D-7668 for the Cetane Ignition Delay (CID 510)

== See also ==
- Diesel engine
- Diesel exhaust
- Petroleum product
