= MAN 630 =

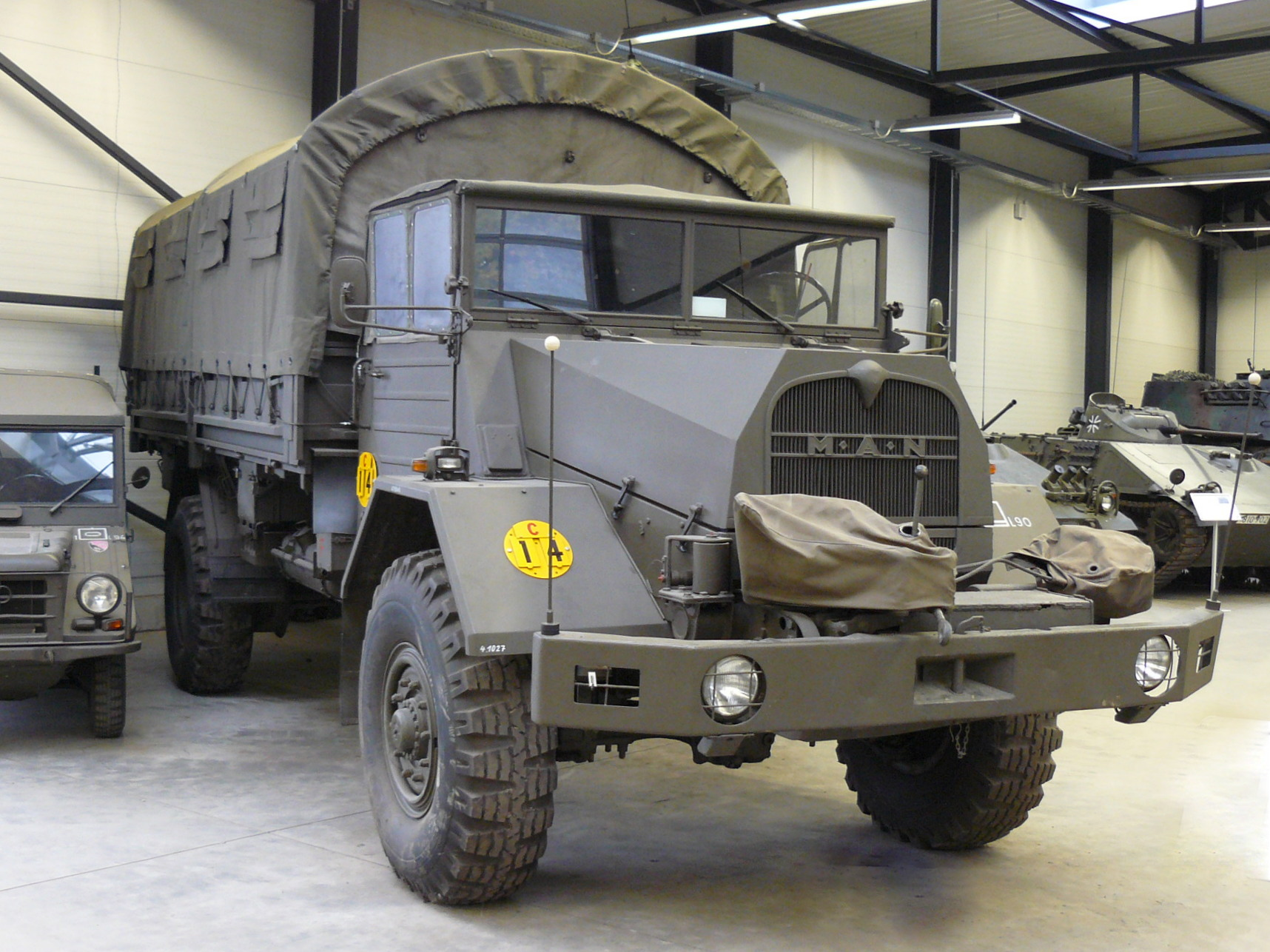
- MAN 630 L2AE

Overview
- Type: Lorry
- Manufacturer: Maschinenfabrik Augsburg Nürnberg
- Production: L1: 1953–1958; L2: 1958–1972; L3: 1959
- Assembly: Germany: München

Body and chassis
- Class: 5 t lorry
- Body style: Long-bonnet, conventional cab lorry
- Layout: Front engine, rear-wheel-drive
- Platform: MAN 630

Powertrain
- Engine: MAN D 1246 (Diesel, 8.276 dm^{3}, 96 kW)
- Transmission: ZF AK 6-55 manual, constant-mesh, six-speed gearbox; Two-speed intermediate gearbox
- Propulsion: Tyres

Dimensions
- Wheelbase: 4600 mm
- Length: 7900 mm
- Width: 2500 mm
- Height: 2980 mm
- Kerb weight: 7980 kg

Chronology
- Predecessor: MAN ML 4500 A
- Successor: None

The MAN 630 is a five-tonne truck, made by German manufacturer Maschinenfabrik Augsburg Nürnberg, from 1953 until 1972. It was made in three major variants, the civilian L1, the military L2, and the civilian L3, with L being an abbreviation for the German word for truck, Lastkraftwagen. The military L2 versions were by far the most common MAN 630s. The German Bundeswehr (Federal Defence Forces) purchased approximately 30,000 units of the L2, and used it as their standard truck alongside the similar five-tonne Mercedes-Benz LG 315.

The 630 was based on the World War 2 ML 4500, which had been produced by MAN between 1940 and 1944.

== Types and models ==
MAN made several different versions of the MAN 630.

L1

- L1: Civilian base model, with rear-wheel-drive. Available as a lorry, and tractor.
- L1A: Off-road-model with additional, switchable front-wheel-drive. Available as a lorry, and tractor.

L2

- L2A: Military base model with additional, switchable front-wheel-drive and 12.00-20 twin rear tyres. Available as a lorry, and tractor.
- L2AE: Like L2A, but with larger 14.00-20 single rear tyres instead of twin tyres. Not available as a tractor.

L3

- L3: Civilian base model with rear-wheel-drive, available as a lorry, and tractor, in long-bonnet, or forward control body styles.
- L3A: Civilian off-road model with additional, switchable front-wheel drive. Available as a lorry, and tractor, in long-bonnet, or forward control body styles.

== Technical description (L2AE) ==
The MAN 630 was primarily produced in the military L2 variants, therefore, the description focuses on these variants, especially the L2AE model.

The 630 L2AE is a two-axle lorry that has a regular U-profile ladder frame. Both the front, and rear axle are leaf-sprung, live beam axles. The MAN 630 has four 14-inch wheels with four same-size 14,00-20 in eHD tyres. The main braking system is a pneumatic dual-circuit system with drum brakes on all wheels. In addition to that, the MAN 630 has an exhaust brake, and a mechanical parking brake for its rear wheels. The steering system is a hydraulically assisted worm-and-roller system.

The lorry is powered by an MAN D 1246 straight-six diesel engine. It uses the M direct injection system, has overhead valves, and is naturally aspirated. Having 112 mm bore, and 140 mm stroke, it displaces 8.276 L. It is rated 130 PS (96 kW) at 2000/min, with its maximum torque of 52 kp⋅m (510 N⋅m) at 1600/min (all figures with NATO F-46 petrol). Like all M-System engines, the D 1246 can burn a huge variety of petroleum-distilled fuels, including regular petrol, but in addition to that, it can also run on premium, and super (mid-grade, and premium in the US), kerosene, waste oil, jet fuel, and conventional diesel engine fuels such as EN 590 and DIN 51601 fuels. The fuel consumption is rated 25 L/100 km.

From the engine, the torque is sent through a dry single-disc clutch to a non-synchronised, constant mesh six-speed gearbox (ZF Allklauengetriebe Type 6–55). It is designed for an input torque of 55 kp⋅m (539 N⋅m), and was made in either a horizontal shift, or a H-shift layout. From the gearbox, the torque is sent with a short propeller shaft to a two-speed transfer gearbox. This means that, the MAN 630 has twelve forward, and two reverse gears in total. The transfer gearbox sends the torque to the rear axle only in its default setting, but it includes a differential, so that the torque can be split evenly between the front and rear axle, to allow for all four wheels to be driven. In order to split the torque unevenly between front and rear axle to prevent any wheels without ground contact from spinning freely, the MAN 630 L2AE models for the Belgian Land Component were fitted with a central differential lock. Bundeswehr 630 LA2Es do not have differential locks. The MAN 630 L2AE can reach a top speed of 66 km/h.

== Military users ==
- Belgium: Landcomponent
- El Salvador
- West Germany: Bundeswehr

== Bibliography ==
- Blume, Peter; Vollert, Jochen (2012). 'Emma': Der MAN 630 L2 A / L2 AE LKW 5 t gl in der Bundeswehr / 'Emma': The MAN 630 L2 A / L2 AE 5-ton Truck in Modern German Army Service. Militärfahrzeug Spezial No. 5040 (in English and German). Erlangen, Germany: Tankograd Publishing. OCLC 835324158.
- Quarrie, Bruce. Encyclopaedia of the German Army in the 20th Century. Patrick Stephens Limited. 1989. ISBN 9780850599220, p. 376
- Automobile Engineer, Volume 44, January-December 1954, p. 158
- Journal of the Institute of Petroleum, Volume 40, 1954, p. 209
