= Calculated Ignition Index =

Index of the ignition quality of residual fuel oil

The Calculated Ignition Index (CII) is an index of the ignition quality of residual fuel oil. It is used to determine the suitability of heavy fuel oil for (marine) engines.

== Background ==
The effective and efficient running of internal combustion engines is dependent on the ignition quality of the fuel. Incorrect or out of specification fuel can cause problems or severe damage to the engines and associated equipment. The effects may include: corrosion, abrasive wear, clogged cylinder valves, fuel equipment damage, fuel pump failure, premature ignition, ignition failure, explosion, or engine failure.

Several indices are used to characterise fuels. For spark-ignition engines the fuel has an octane rating. For diesel engines it depends on the type of fuel, for distillate fuels the cetane numbers are used. Cetane numbers are tested using a special test engine, however, the existing test engine was not intended for residual fuels. For residual fuel oil two auxiliary indexes have been developed: the Calculated Ignition Index (CII) and Calculated Carbon Aromaticity Index (CCAI).

== CII index ==
The calculated ignition index (CII), together with the calculated carbon aromaticity index (CCAI), are empirical indicators which describe the characteristics or properties of a fuel.

Both CII and CCAI are calculated from the density and kinematic viscosity of the fuel. CII was developed by BP to calculate the autoignition capacity of heavy fuel oils (HFO). It is calculated using the measured kinematic viscosity V (cSt or mm^{2}/s) of a given fuel determined at temperature t (°C) and the density ρ_{15} at 15°C (kg/m^{3}).

== Definition ==
Formula for CII:

  
    
      
        C
        I
        I
        =
        (
        270.795
        +
        0.1038
        T
        )
        −
        0.254565
        D
        +
        23.708
        log
        ⁡
        log
        ⁡
        (
        V
        +
        0.7
        )
        
      
    
    {\displaystyle CII=(270.795+0.1038T)-0.254565D+23.708\log \log(V+0.7)\,}
  

Where:
D = density at 15°C (kg/m^{3})
V = kinematic viscosity (cSt)
T =kinematic viscosity temperature (°C)

A CCAI and CII calculator is available on several websites.

== Use ==
CII was designed to produce numbers of the same order as the cetane index number for distillate fuels. The relationship between fuel properties and CII number is shown in the table.

CII range and fuel ignition properties
Description of fuel	CII / Cetane Number
Very bad ignition properties	<25
Bad ignition properties	25 – 28
Acceptable to good ignition properties	28 – 35
Good ignition properties	35 – 40
Very good ignition properties	>40

CII gives an indication of the quality of heavy fuel oil. Certain practical steps can be taken to ensure the continuing quality. This includes close supervision of fuel, including tests during bunkering using the viscosity data to determine the CII and CCAI. Avoid mixing fuels; checking water content as the water settles out; monitoring the condition and performance of engines.
