= Isocetane =

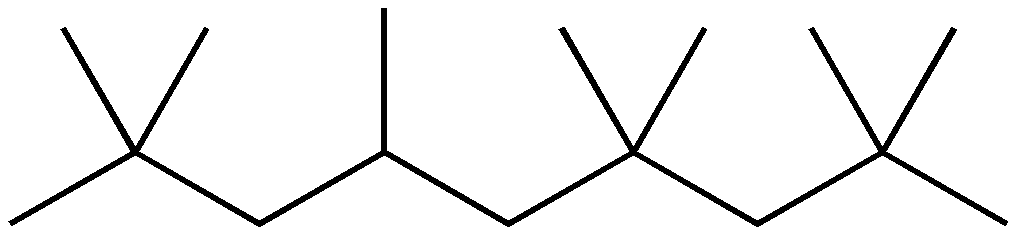
- Skeletal formula of icocetane

Names
- IUPAC name 2,2,4,4,6,8,8-Heptamethylnonane

Identifiers
CAS Number	4390-04-9
3D model (JSmol)	Interactive image
ChEBI	CHEBI:131383
ChemSpider	19228
ECHA InfoCard	100.022.280
EC Number	224-506-8
MeSH	2,2,4,4,6,8,8-heptamethylnonane
PubChem CID	20414
UNII	8LP0677305
CompTox Dashboard (EPA)	DTXSID7052101
- InChI: InChI=1S/C16H34/c1-13(10-14(2,3)4)11-16(8,9)12-15(5,6)7/h13H,10-12H2,1-9H3 Key: VCLJODPNBNEBKW-UHFFFAOYSA-N
- SMILES: C(C)(C)CC(C)CC(C)(C)CC(C)(C)C

Properties
Chemical formula	C_{16}H_{34}
Molar mass	226.448 g·mol^{−1}
Appearance	Colourless liquid
Odor	Odourless
Density	793 mg mL^{−1}
Boiling point	240.1 °C; 464.1 °F; 513.2 K
Vapor pressure	130 Pa (at 20 °C)
Refractive index (n_{D})	1.439

Thermochemistry
Heat capacity (C)	458.80 J K^{−1} mol^{−1}

Hazards
Flash point	96.00 °C (204.80 °F; 369.15 K)

Related compounds
Related alkanes	2,3-Dimethylhexane; 2,5-Dimethylhexane; Pristane
- Except where otherwise noted, data are given for materials in their standard state (at 25 °C [77 °F], 100 kPa). verify (what is ?) Infobox references

Isocetane (2,2,4,4,6,8,8-heptamethylnonane) is a highly branched alkane used as a reference in determining the cetane number of diesel. It has a cetane number of 15. Isocetane replaced 1-methylnaphthalene in 1962 as the lower reference for cetane number (1-methylnaphthalene has cetane number zero) owing to the oxidation instability and difficulty of use of 1-methylnaphthalene in the reference engine.

Strictly speaking, if the standard meaning of ‘iso’ is followed, the name isocetane should be reserved for the isomer 2-methylpentadecane. However, 2,2,4,4,6,8,8-heptamethylnonane is by far the most important isomer of cetane and so, historically, it has ended up with this name.
