= EN 590 =

Current European Union standard for diesel fuel

EN 590 is a standard published by the European Committee for Standardization that describes the physical and chemical properties that all automotive diesel fuel must meet if it is to be sold in the European Union and several other European countries.

Based on 98/70/EG it allows the blending of up to 7% fatty acid methyl ester biodiesel with 'conventional' diesel - a 7:93 mix.

== History ==
The EN 590 had been introduced along with the European emission standards. With each of its revisions the EN 590 had been adapted to lower the sulphur content of diesel fuel – since 2007 this is called ultra-low-sulphur diesel as the former function of sulphur as a lubricant is absent (and needs to be replaced by additives).

| emission standard | at latest | sulphur content | cetane number |
|---|---|---|---|
| Euro 1 | 1 January 1993 | max. 0.200% | min. 49 |
| Euro 2 | 1 January 1996 | max. 0.050% | min. 49 |
| Euro 3 | 1 January 2001 | max. 0.035% | min. 51 |
| Euro 4 | 1 January 2006 | max. 0.005% | min. 51 |
| Euro 5 | 1 January 2009 | max. 0.001% | min. 51 |
| Euro 6 | 1 January 2014 | | |

== Generally applicable requirements and test methods ==
| Property | Unit | lower limit | upper limit | Test-Method |
|---|---|---|---|---|
| Cetane index | | 46.0 | - | EN ISO 4264 |
| Cetane number | | 51.0 | - | EN ISO 5165 |
| Density at 15°C | kg/m³ | 820 | 845 | EN ISO 3675, EN ISO 12185 |
| Polycyclic aromatic hydrocarbons | %(m/m) | - | 11 | EN ISO 12916 |
| Sulphur content | mg/kg | - | 350 (until 2004-12-31) or 50.0 | EN ISO 20846, EN ISO 20847, EN ISO 20884 |
| | | | 10.0 (on the 01-01-2009) | EN ISO 20846, EN ISO 20884 |
| Flash point | °C | Above 55 | - | EN ISO 2719 |
| Carbon residue (on 10% distillation residue) | %m/m | - | 0.30 | EN ISO 10370 |
| Ash content | % (m/m) | - | 0.01 | EN ISO 6245 |
| Water content | mg/kg | - | 200 | EN ISO 12937 |
| Total contamination | mg/kg | - | 24 | EN ISO 12662 |
| Copper strip corrosion (3 hours at 50 °C) | rating | Class 1 | Class 1 | EN ISO 2160 |
| Oxidation Stability | g/m^{3} | - | 25 | EN ISO 12205 |
| Lubricity, corrected wear scar diameter (wsd 1.4) at 60 °C | μm | - | 460 | EN ISO 12156-1 |
| Viscosity at 40 °C | mm^{2}/s | 2.00 | 4.50 | EN ISO 3104, ISO 23581 |
| Distillation recovered at 250 °C, 350 °C | %V/V | 85 | <65 | EN ISO 3405 |
| 95%(V/V) recovered at | °C | - | 360 | |
| Fatty acid methyl ester content | % (V/V) | - | 7 | EN 14078 |

== GOST R 32511-2013 ==
| Property | Unit | Value |
|---|---|---|
| Cetane index | | 46.0 |
| Cetane number | | 51.0 |
| Density at 15°C | kg/m³ | 820-845 |
| Polycyclic aromatic hydrocarbons | %(m/m) | 8.0 |
| Sulphur content - type K3 | mg/kg | 350 |
| Sulphur content - type K4 | mg/kg | 50 |
| Sulphur content - type K5 | mg/kg | 10 |
| Flash point | °C | 55 |
| Carbon residue (on 10% distillation residue) | %m/m | 0.30 |
| Ash content | % (m/m) | 0.01 |
| Water content | mg/kg | 200 |
| Total contamination | mg/kg | 24 |
| Copper strip corrosion (3 hours at 50 °C) | rating | Class 1 |
| Stability no more than | g/m^{3} | 25 |
| Lubricity, corrected wear scar diameter (wsd 1,4) at 60 °C | μm | 460 |
| Viscosity at 40 °C | mm^{2}/s | 2.00-4.50 |
| Distillation recovered at 250 °C, 350 °C | %V/V | 65.85 |
| 95%(V/V) recovered at | °C | 360 |
| Fatty acid methyl ester content no more than | % (V/V) | 7.0 |

== Winter Diesel ==
The standard EN 590 puts diesel fuel into two groups destined for specific climatic environments. For the "temperate" climatic zones the standard defines six classes from A to F. For the "arctic" climatic zones the standard defines five classes from 0 to 4.

temperate climatic zones
| Characteristics | Class A | Class B | Class C | Class D | Class E | Class F | Units |
|---|---|---|---|---|---|---|---|
| CFPP | +5 | 0 | -5 | -10 | -15 | -20 | °C |
| Density at 15 °C | 820 - 860 | 820 - 860 | 820 - 860 | 820 - 860 | 820 - 860 | 820 - 860 | kg/m³ |
| Viscosity at 40 °C | 2 - 4.5 | 2 - 4.5 | 2 - 4.5 | 2 - 4.5 | 2 - 4.5 | 2 - 4.5 | mm²/s |
| Cetane index | 46 | 46 | 46 | 46 | 46 | 46 | |
| Cetane number | 49 | 49 | 49 | 49 | 49 | 49 | |

arctic climatic zones
| Characteristics | Class 0 | Class 1 | Class 2 | Class 3 | Class 4 | Unit |
|---|---|---|---|---|---|---|
| CFPP | -20 | -26 | -32 | -38 | -44 | °C |
| Cloud point | -10 | -16 | -22 | -28 | -34 | °C |
| Density at 15 °C | 800 - 845 | 800 - 845 | 800 - 845 | 800 - 840 | 800 - 840 | kg/m³ |
| Viscosity at 40 °C | 1.5 - 4.0 | 1.5 - 4.0 | 1.5 - 4.0 | 1.4 - 4.0 | 1.2 - 4.0 | mm²/s |
| Cetane index | 46 | 46 | 45 | 43 | 43 | |
| Cetane number | 47 | 47 | 46 | 45 | 45 | |

Many countries in Europe require diesel fuel to meet a specific class in winter times. In Central and Western Europe the Winter Diesel (Winterdiesel, diesel d'hiver) must meet Class F conditions at least from the beginning of December to the end of February. During a transitional period (mostly October and April) a lower Class must be met. In the Scandinavian countries the Winter Diesel (Vinterdiesel) must meet Class 2 conditions. Some mineral groups offer both types commonly known as Winter Diesel (Winterdiesel, diesel d'hiver) and Arctic Diesel (Polardiesel, diesel polaires).

== See also ==
- EN 14214
- European emission standards
- Hydrogenated vegetable oil
- Ultra-low-sulfur diesel
- EN 15940 paraffinic diesel fuel standard
