= Cyclodecapentaene =

- all-cis isomer of cyclodecapentaene

Names
- Preferred IUPAC name Cyclodeca-1,3,5,7,9-pentaene
- Other names [10]Annulene

Identifiers
| CAS Number | 3227-76-7 |
| 3D model (JSmol) | Interactive image |
| ChemSpider | 11341429 all-cis isomer |
| PubChem CID | 15398566 |
- InChI: InChI=1S/C10H10/c1-2-4-6-8-10-9-7-5-3-1/h1-10H/b2-1-,3-1-,4-2-,5-3+,6-4+,7-5+,8-6+,9-7-,10-8-,10-9- Key: ZYRKBGIIBMTQHN-HGJACCJQSA-N
- SMILES: C1=C\C=C\C=C/C=C/C=C/1

Properties
| Chemical formula | C_{10}H_{10} |
| Molar mass | 130.190 g·mol^{−1} |
- Except where otherwise noted, data are given for materials in their standard state (at 25 °C [77 °F], 100 kPa). Infobox references

Cyclodecapentaene or [10]annulene is an annulene with molecular formula C_{10}H_{10}. This organic compound is a conjugated 10 pi electron cyclic system and according to Huckel's rule it should display aromaticity. It is not aromatic, however, because various types of ring strain destabilize an all-planar geometry.

== Conformation, strain, and non-aromaticity ==
(1): a hypothetical planar conformation for all-cis-[10]annulene.

(2): the lowest-energy conformation for all-cis-[10]annulene

(3): one hypothetical planar conformation for trans,cis,trans,cis,cis-[10]annulene

(4): one conformation for trans,cis,cis,cis,cis-[10]annulene

Although not aromatic itself, [10]annulene can transition between different conformational isomers through aromatic or quasiaromatic excited states, such that its conformational isomerism is fixed only at extreme cryogenic temperatures. Understanding the composition and reactivity of these mixtures computationally has proven difficult, because a large number of conformations all minimize the energy locally.

The all-cis isomer (1), a fully convex decagon, would have bond angles of 144°, which creates large amounts of angle strain relative to the ideal 120° in sp^{2} atomic hybridization. Instead, the all-cis isomer adopts a planar boat-like conformation (2) to relieve the angle strain, although it, too, is less stable than the next planar isomer, trans,cis,trans,cis,cis-[10]annulene (3). Yet even isomer (3) is unstable, suffering from steric repulsion between the two internal hydrogen atoms, and tends to distort into the perimeter of two fused circles, one larger and the other smaller, as in azulene. The nonplanar trans,cis,cis,cis,cis isomer is the most stable of all possible isomers, although it is unclear whether it too has a boat-like configuration as in conformer (4), or the "heart" configuration produced if one internal hydrogen in conformer (3) were flipped inside-out.

== Synthesis ==
Cyclodecapentaene can undergo an electrocyclic rearrangement to or from 4a,8a-dihydronaphthalene. Photolysis of the latter generates [10]annulene, but it quickly reverts to the reactant, even at cryogenic temperatures.

== Aromatic derivatives ==
(5): an aromatic bridged [10]annulene

(6): An aromatic tricyclic [10]annulene

Aromaticity can be induced in compounds having a [10]annulene-type core if planarity is forcibly imposed by other substituents. Two methods to do so are known.

One method is to formally replace two hydrogen atoms by a methylene bridge (−CH_{2}−); this gives the planar bicyclic 1,6-methano[10]annulene (5). Indeed, 1,6-methano[10]annulene has no bond length alternation in its X-ray structure and signs of a telltale diamagnetic ring current in its NMR spectrum. Likewise, a tricyclic methine bridge gives an aromatic structure (6) similar to the stable oxonium ion oxatriquinacene.

(7): a very acidic cyclodecapentaene derivative

When deprotonated to form the anion this type of compound is even more stabilized. The central carbanion enhances the molecule's planarity and the number of resonance structures that can be drawn is extended to 7, including two resonance forms with a complete benzene ring. Computational chemistry suggests a tricyclic[10]annulene derivative with an annulated benzene ring and a full set of cyano substituents (7) would be one of the most acidic compounds known, with a computed pK_{a} in DMSO of −30.4 (compared to for instance −20 for magic acid).

The other method is to further remove hydrogens and develop triple bonds or cyclopropanes along the ring. Thus computational studies suggest that cyclodecatetraeneyne is planar and aromatic, as is bicyclo[8.1.0]undeca-1,3,7,9-tetraen-5-yne. Predicting the aromaticity of these compounds is not always obvious: the polycyclic hydrocarbon tetradihydronaphtho[10]annulene, in which a valence isomer of [10]annulene is fused to two naphthalenes, does not exhibit aromaticity inside the central 10-π ring.

== Other related compounds ==
- Azulene is also a 10 π-electron system in which aromaticity is maintained by direct transannular bonding to form a fused 7–5 bicyclic molecule.
- Cyclodecatetraene is a stable, non-aromatic 8 π-electron system with no ring strain.
