= 2-Methylpentadecane =

Hydrocarbon chemical compound

- Skeletal formula of

Identifiers
CAS Number	1560-93-6
3D model (JSmol)	Interactive image
ChEBI	CHEBI:183308
ChemSpider	14532
PubChem CID	15267
UNII	04R9AW5KWV
CompTox Dashboard (EPA)	DTXSID70166026
- InChI: InChI=1S/C16H34/c1-4-5-6-7-8-9-10-11-12-13-14-15-16(2)3/h16H,4-15H2,1-3H3 Key: BANXPJUEBPWEOT-UHFFFAOYSA-N
- SMILES: CCCCCCCCCCCCCC(C)C

Properties
Chemical formula	C_{16}H_{34}
Molar mass	226.448 g·mol^{−1}
Appearance	Colorless liquid
Melting point	−7 °C (19 °F; 266 K)
Boiling point	281.6 °C (538.9 °F; 554.8 K)

Hazards
- GHS labelling
Pictograms	(GHS08: Health hazard)
Signal word	Danger
Precautionary statements	P301+P316, P331, P405, P501
- Except where otherwise noted, data are given for materials in their standard state (at 25 °C [77 °F], 100 kPa). Infobox references

2-Methylpentadecane is a chemical compound with the formula (CH_{3})_{2}CH(CH_{2})_{12}CH_{3}. It is one of several isomers of hexadecane. It is found in Capsicum annuum and Plantago ovata.
