= 1,5-Methano(10)annulene =

1,5-Methano[10]annulene

Names
- Preferred IUPAC name Bicyclo[5.3.1]undeca-1,3,5,7,9-pentaene
- Other names Homoazulene

Identifiers
CAS Number	65754-71-4
3D model (JSmol)	Interactive image
ChemSpider	19985104; 127147
PubChem CID	144132
UNII	LU8E5GD7X3
- InChI: InChI=1S/C11H10/c1-2-5-10-7-4-8-11(9-10)6-3-1/h1-8H,9H2/b2-1-,3-1-,5-2-,6-3-,10-5-,11-6- Key: PVDVWMOTLDWVRK-FLXUIKBISA-N
- SMILES: c1cc2cccccc(c1)C2

Properties
Chemical formula	C_{11}H_{10}
Molar mass	142.201 g·mol^{−1}
- Except where otherwise noted, data are given for materials in their standard state (at 25 °C [77 °F], 100 kPa). Infobox references

1,5-Methano[10]annulene, bicyclo[5.3.1]undeca-1,3,5,7,9-pentaene or homoazulene is a hydrocarbon with chemical formula C_{11}H_{10}.

== See also ==
- Homoaromaticity
- Cyclodecapentaene
- 1,6-Methano[10]annulene
