= 1-Methylnaphthalene =

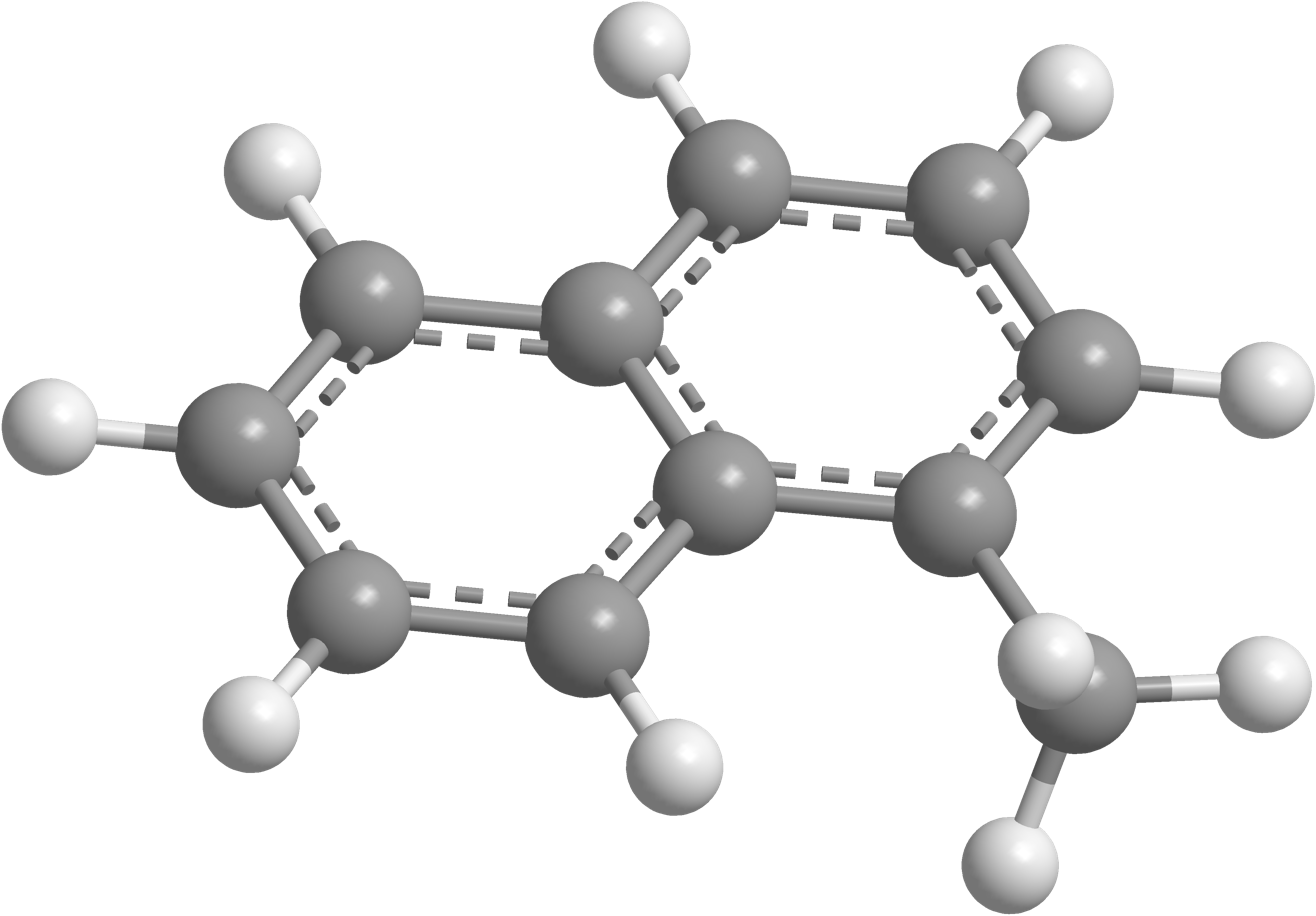

Names
- Preferred IUPAC name 1-Methylnaphthalene
- Other names α-methylnaphthalene

Identifiers
CAS Number	90-12-0
3D model (JSmol)	Interactive image
Beilstein Reference	506793
ChEBI	CHEBI:50717
ChEMBL	ChEMBL383808
ChemSpider	6736
ECHA InfoCard	100.001.788
EC Number	201-966-8
KEGG	C14082
PubChem CID	7002
RTECS number	QJ9630000
UNII	E7SK1Y1311
UN number	3082 1993
CompTox Dashboard (EPA)	DTXSID9020877
- InChI: InChI=1S/C11H10/c1-9-5-4-7-10-6-2-3-8-11(9)10/h2-8H,1H3 Key: QPUYECUOLPXSFR-UHFFFAOYSA-N; InChI=1/C11H10/c1-9-5-4-7-10-6-2-3-8-11(9)10/h2-8H,1H3 Key: QPUYECUOLPXSFR-UHFFFAOYAD
- SMILES: Cc1cccc2ccccc12

Properties
Chemical formula	C_{11}H_{10}
Molar mass	142.20 g/mol
Appearance	Liquid
Density	1.001 g/mL
Melting point	−22 °C (−8 °F; 251 K)
Boiling point	244.8 °C (472.6 °F; 518.0 K)
Vapor pressure	4.91
Magnetic susceptibility (χ)	−102.8·10^{−6} cm^{3}/mol

Hazards
- GHS labelling
Pictograms	(GHS07: Exclamation mark) (GHS08: Health hazard) (GHS09: Environmental hazard)
Signal word	Danger
Hazard statements	H302, H304, H411
Precautionary statements	P264, P270, P273, P301+P310, P301+P312, P330, P331, P391, P405, P501
Flash point	82 °C (180 °F; 355 K)
- Except where otherwise noted, data are given for materials in their standard state (at 25 °C [77 °F], 100 kPa). verify (what is ?) Infobox references

1-Methylnaphthalene is an organic compound with the formula C_{11}H_{10}. It is a colorless liquid. It is isomeric with 2-methylnaphthalene. It is generally obtained as a minor component of coal tar.

== Reference fuel ==
1-Methylnaphthalene defines the lower (zero) reference point of cetane number, a measure of diesel fuel ignition quality, as it has a long ignition delay (poor ignition qualities). In contrast, cetane, with its short ignition delay, defines the upper reference point at 100. In testing, isocetane (2,2,4,4,6,8,8-heptamethylnonane or HMN) replaced 1-methylnaphthalene as the low cetane number reference fuel in 1962 for reasons of better oxidation stability and ease of use in the reference engine. The scale is unchanged, as isocetane's cetane number is measured at 15, referenced to 1-methylnaphthalene and cetane.

== Methylnaphthalene anion ==
With alkali metals, 1-methylnaphthalene forms radical anion salts such as sodium 1-methylnaphthalene. Compared to its structural analog sodium naphthalene, sodium 1-methylnaphthalene is more soluble, which is useful for low-temperature reductions.

== Safety ==
The LD50 for 1-methylnaphthalene is low, being 2800 mg/kg (rats).

== See also ==
- Naphthalene
