= 1,6-Methano(10)annulene =

1,6-Methano[10]annulene

Names
- Preferred IUPAC name Bicyclo[4.4.1]undeca-1,3,5,7,9-pentaene

Identifiers
CAS Number	2443-46-1
3D model (JSmol)	Interactive image
ChemSpider	121264
PubChem CID	137603
UNII	HMG3LPN8YP
CompTox Dashboard (EPA)	DTXSID40179188
- InChI: InChI=1S/C11H10/c1-2-6-11-8-4-3-7-10(5-1)9-11/h1-8H,9H2 Key: OORRQYZWSVJKSO-UHFFFAOYSA-N; InChI=1/C11H10/c1-2-6-11-8-4-3-7-10(5-1)9-11/h1-8H,9H2 Key: OORRQYZWSVJKSO-UHFFFAOYAC
- SMILES: c1ccc2ccccc(c1)C2

Properties
Chemical formula	C_{11}H_{10}
Molar mass	142.201 g·mol^{−1}
- Except where otherwise noted, data are given for materials in their standard state (at 25 °C [77 °F], 100 kPa). Infobox references

1,6-Methano[10]annulene (also known as 1,6-methanonaphthalene or homonaphthalene) is an aromatic hydrocarbon with chemical formula C_{11}H_{10}. It was the first stable aromatic compound based on the cyclodecapentaene system to be discovered.

== Preparation ==
The classical organic synthesis of this compound starts with Birch reduction of naphthalene to isotetralin, which adds dichlorocarbene (prepared in situ from chloroform and potassium tert-butoxide) to form a transannular cyclopropane ring. A second reduction then removes the chloride substituents. Finally, 2,3-dichloro-5,6-dicyano-1,4-benzoquinone (DDQ) oxidation removes the central transannular bond and dehydrogenates unto aromaticity.

== Aromaticity ==
It is analogous to cyclodecapentaene ([10]annulene), but with two hydrogen atoms replaced by a transannular methylene bridge (−CH_{2}−). Consequently, it obeys Hückel's rule (n = 2) and despite the distortion from planarity introduced by the methylene bridge, the compound is aromatic. In fact, when prepared by Vogel in the 1960s it was the first stable aromatic cyclodecapentaene to be discovered. Its aromaticity is confirmed by two main pieces of evidence. Firstly, the similarity in carbon-carbon bond lengths as measured by x-ray crystallography is inconsistent with alternating single and double bonds. The actual structure is better considered as a pair of resonance hybrids (like the Kekulé structures of benzene) rather than as having alternating single and double bonds.

Secondly, its ^{1}H NMR spectrum displays influence of the diamagnetic ring current which is characteristic of aromatic compounds. The peripheral protons around the ring are deshielded while the methylene bridge nuclei are strongly shielded.

Its resonance energy is smaller than that of naphthalene.

== Possible applications ==
Homonaphthalene has been used in the production of conductive polymers.

== See also ==
- Homoaromaticity
- Cyclodecapentaene
- 1,5-Methano[10]annulene
