= Calculated Carbon Aromaticity Index =

Index of the ignition quality of residual fuel oil

The calculated carbon aromaticity index (CCAI) is an index of the ignition quality of residual fuel oil.

The running of all internal combustion engines is dependent on the ignition quality of the fuel. For spark-ignition engines the fuel has an octane rating. For diesel engines it depends on the type of fuel, for distillate fuels the cetane numbers are used. Cetane numbers are tested using a special test engine and the existing engine was not made for residual fuels. For residual fuel oil two other empirical indexes are used: CCAI and Calculated Ignition Index (CII). Both CCAI and CII are calculated from the density and kinematic viscosity of the fuel.

== Definition ==
Formula for CCAI:

$CCAI=D-140.7 \log (\log (V+0.85))-80.6-210 \ln \left (\frac{t+273}{323} \right )$

which is equivalent to:

$CCAI=D-140.7 \log (\log (V+0.85))-80.6-483.5 \log \left (\frac{t+273}{323} \right )$

Where:
D= density at 15°C (kg/m^{3})
V= viscosity (cST)
t = viscosity temperature (°C).

== Use ==
This will normally give a value somewhere between 800 and 880. The lower the value is the better the ignition quality. Fuels with a CCAI higher than 880 are often problematic or even unusable in a diesel engine. CCAI are often calculated under testing of marine fuel. In case of high CCAI, the manufacturers recommendations and guidance limits should be consulted to ensure that the fuel falls within the permissible range for the engine type. Attention should be given to the combustion profile, peak pressures and exhaust temperatures on the Engine.

As the name suggests, CCAI is a calculation based on the density and viscosity of a given fuel. The formula is rather complex but in general, the higher the CCAI, the poorer the ignition quality of the fuel is considered to be. Once the CCAI goes above 860, it is an indication that some combustion problems may occur.

Studies carried out by engine manufacturers indicate that combustion related problems caused by fuels with high CCAI can be reduced by avoiding running the engine at part load. It is therefore suggested that wherever possible, the engine load should be maintained above 50% and the chief engineer should listen for indications of poor combustion (i.e. knocking). Should any such problems be noted then it is recommended that an alternative fuel is used whilst further investigations are carried out on samples from this fuel
