= Diesel fuel =

Liquid fuel used in diesel engines

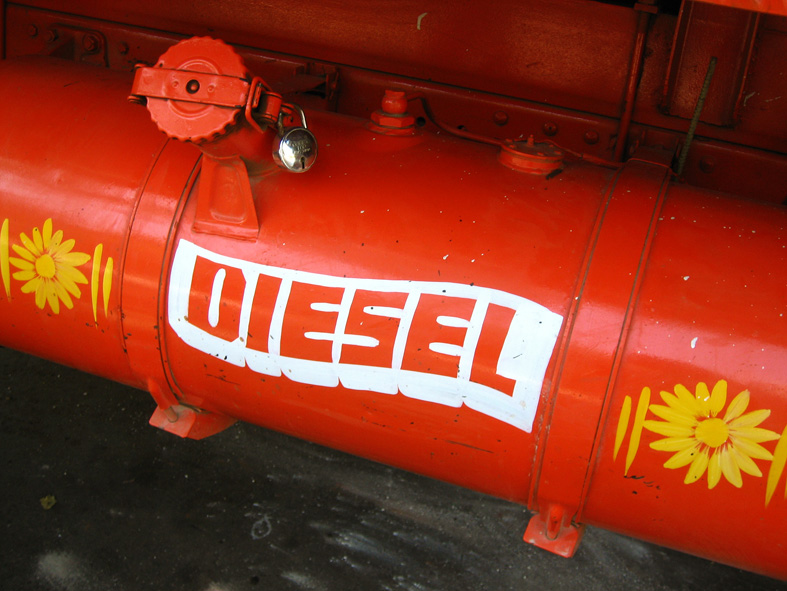
A tank of diesel fuel on a truck

Diesel fuel, also called diesel oil, fuel oil (historically), or simply diesel, is any liquid fuel specifically designed for use in a diesel engine, a type of internal combustion engine in which fuel ignition takes place as a result of compression of the inlet air and then injection of fuel without a spark. Therefore, diesel fuel needs good compression ignition characteristics.

The most common type of diesel fuel is a specific fractional distillate of petroleum fuel oil, but alternatives that are not derived from petroleum, such as biodiesel, biomass to liquid (BTL) or gas to liquid (GTL) diesel are increasingly being developed and adopted. To distinguish these types, petroleum-derived diesel is sometimes called petrodiesel in some academic circles. Diesel is a high-volume product of oil refineries.

In many countries, diesel fuel is standardized. For example, in the European Union, the standard for diesel fuel is EN 590. Ultra-low-sulfur diesel (ULSD) is a diesel fuel with substantially lowered sulfur contents. As of 2016, almost all of the petroleum-based diesel fuel available in the United Kingdom, mainland Europe, and North America is of a ULSD type. Before diesel fuel had been standardized, the majority of diesel engines typically ran on cheap fuel oils. These fuel oils are still used in watercraft diesel engines. Despite being specifically designed for diesel engines, diesel fuel can also be used as fuel for several non-diesel engines, for example the Akroyd engine, the Stirling engine, or boilers for steam engines. Diesel is often used in heavy trucks. However, diesel exhaust, especially from older engines, can cause health damage.

== Names ==
Diesel fuel has many colloquial names; most commonly, it is simply referred to as diesel. In the United Kingdom, diesel fuel for road use is commonly called diesel or sometimes white diesel if required to differentiate it from a reduced-tax agricultural-only product containing an identifying coloured dye known as red diesel. The official term for white diesel is DERV, standing for diesel-engine road vehicle. In Australia, diesel fuel is also known as distillate (not to be confused with "distillate" in an older sense referring to a different motor fuel), and in Indonesia and most of the Middle East, it is known as Solar, a trademarked name from the country's national petroleum company Pertamina. The term gas oil (French: gazole) is sometimes also used to refer to diesel fuel.

== History ==
=== Origins ===
Diesel fuel originated from experiments conducted by German scientist and inventor Rudolf Diesel for his compression-ignition engine, which he invented around 1892. Originally, Diesel did not consider using any specific type of fuel. Instead, he claimed that the operating principle of his rational heat motor would work with any kind of fuel in any state of matter. The first diesel engine prototype and the first functional Diesel engine were only designed for liquid fuels.

At first, Diesel tested crude oil from Pechelbronn, but soon replaced it with petrol and kerosene, because crude oil proved to be too viscous, with the main testing fuel for the Diesel engine being kerosene (paraffin). Diesel experimented with types of lamp oil from various sources, as well as types of petrol and ligroin, which all worked well as Diesel engine fuels. Later, Diesel tested coal tar creosote, paraffin oil, crude oil, petrol and fuel oil, which eventually worked as well. In Scotland and France, shale oil was used as fuel for the first 1898 production Diesel engines because other fuels were too expensive. In 1900, the French Otto society built a Diesel engine for use with crude oil, which was exhibited at the 1900 Paris Exposition and the 1911 World's Fair in Paris. The engine actually ran on peanut oil instead of crude oil, and no modifications were necessary for peanut oil operation.

During his first Diesel engine tests, Diesel also used illuminating gas as fuel, and managed to build functional designs, both with and without pilot injection. According to Diesel, neither was a coal-dust–producing industry existent, nor was fine, high-quality coal-dust commercially available in the late 1890s. This is the reason why the Diesel engine was never designed or planned as a coal-dust engine. Only in December 1899, did Diesel test a coal-dust prototype, which used external mixture formation and liquid fuel pilot injection. This engine proved to be functional, but suffered from piston ring failure after a few minutes due to coal dust deposition.

=== Since the 20th century ===
Before diesel fuel was standardised, diesel engines typically ran on cheap fuel oils. In the United States, these were distilled from petroleum, whereas in Europe, coal-tar creosote oil was used. Some diesel engines were fuelled with mixtures of fuels, such as petrol, kerosene, rapeseed oil, or lubricating oil, which were cheaper because, at the time, they were not being taxed. The introduction of motor-vehicle diesel engines, such as the Mercedes-Benz OM 138, in the 1930s meant that higher-quality fuels with proper ignition characteristics were needed. At first no improvements were made to motor-vehicle diesel fuel quality. After World War II, the first modern high-quality diesel fuels were standardised. These standards were, for instance, the DIN 51601, VTL 9140–001, and NATO F 54 standards. In 1993, the DIN 51601 was rendered obsolete by the new EN 590 standard, which has been used in the European Union ever since. In sea-going watercraft, where diesel propulsion had gained prevalence by the late 1970s due to increasing fuel costs caused by the 1970s energy crisis, cheap heavy fuel oils are still used instead of conventional motor-vehicle diesel fuel. These heavy fuel oils (often called Bunker C) can be used in diesel-powered and steam-powered vessels.

== Types ==
Diesel fuel is produced from various sources, the most common being petroleum. Other sources include biomass, animal fat, biogas, natural gas, and coal liquefaction.

=== Petroleum diesel ===
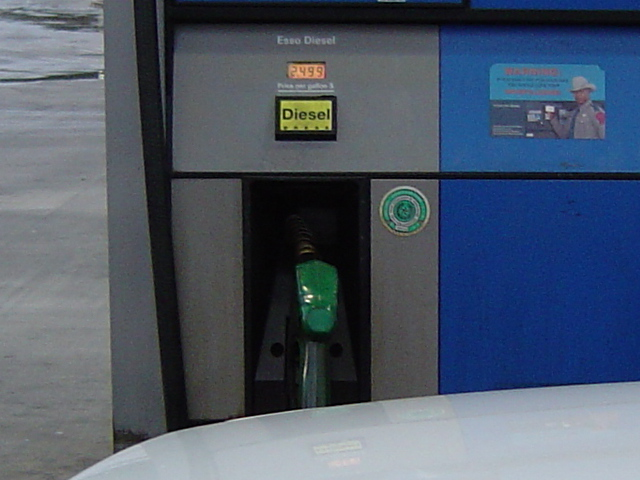
A modern diesel dispenser

Petroleum diesel is the most common type of diesel fuel. It is produced by the fractional distillation of crude oil between 200 and 350 °C (392 and 662 °F) at atmospheric pressure, resulting in a mixture of carbon chains that typically contain between 9 and 25 carbon atoms per molecule. This fraction is subjected to hydrodesulfurization.

Usually such "straight-run" diesel is insufficient in supply and quality, so other sources of diesel fuels are blended in. One major source of additional diesel fuel is obtained by cracking heavier fractions, using visbreaking and coking. This technology converts less useful fractions but the product contains olefins (alkenes) which require hydrogenation to give the saturated hydrocarbons as desired. Another refinery stream that contributes to diesel fuel is hydrocracking. Finally, kerosene is added to modify its viscosity.

=== Synthetic diesel ===
Synthetic diesel can be produced from many carbonaceous precursors but natural gas is the most important. Raw materials are converted to synthesis gas which, by the Fischer–Tropsch process, is converted to a synthetic diesel. Synthetic diesel produced in this way generally is mainly paraffins with low sulfur and aromatics content. This material is often blended into the above-mentioned petroleum-derived diesel.

=== Biodiesel ===
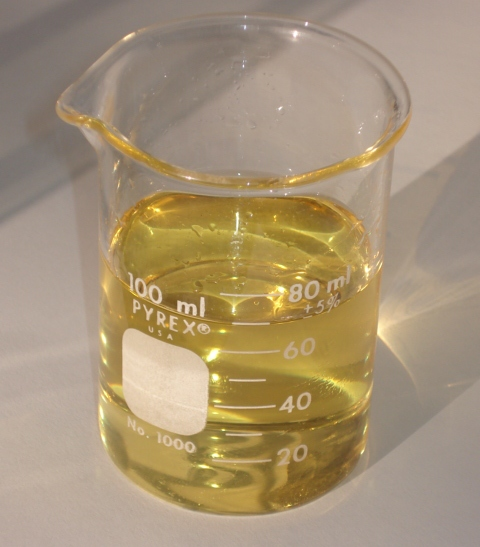
Biodiesel made from soybean oil

Biodiesel is obtained from vegetable oil or animal fats (biolipids) which are mainly transesterified with methanol to form fatty acid methyl esters (FAME). It can be produced from many types of oils, the most common being rapeseed oil (rapeseed methyl ester, RME) in Europe and soybean oil (soy methyl ester, SME) in the US. Methanol can also be replaced with ethanol for the transesterification process, which results in the production of ethyl esters. The transesterification processes use catalysts, such as sodium or potassium hydroxide, to convert vegetable oil and methanol into biodiesel and the undesirable byproducts glycerine and water, which will need to be removed from the fuel along with methanol traces. Biodiesel can be used pure (B100) in engines where the manufacturer approves such use, but it is more often used as a mix with diesel, BXX where XX is the biodiesel content in percent.

FAME used as fuel is specified in DIN EN 14214 and ASTM D6751 standards.

== Storage and additives ==
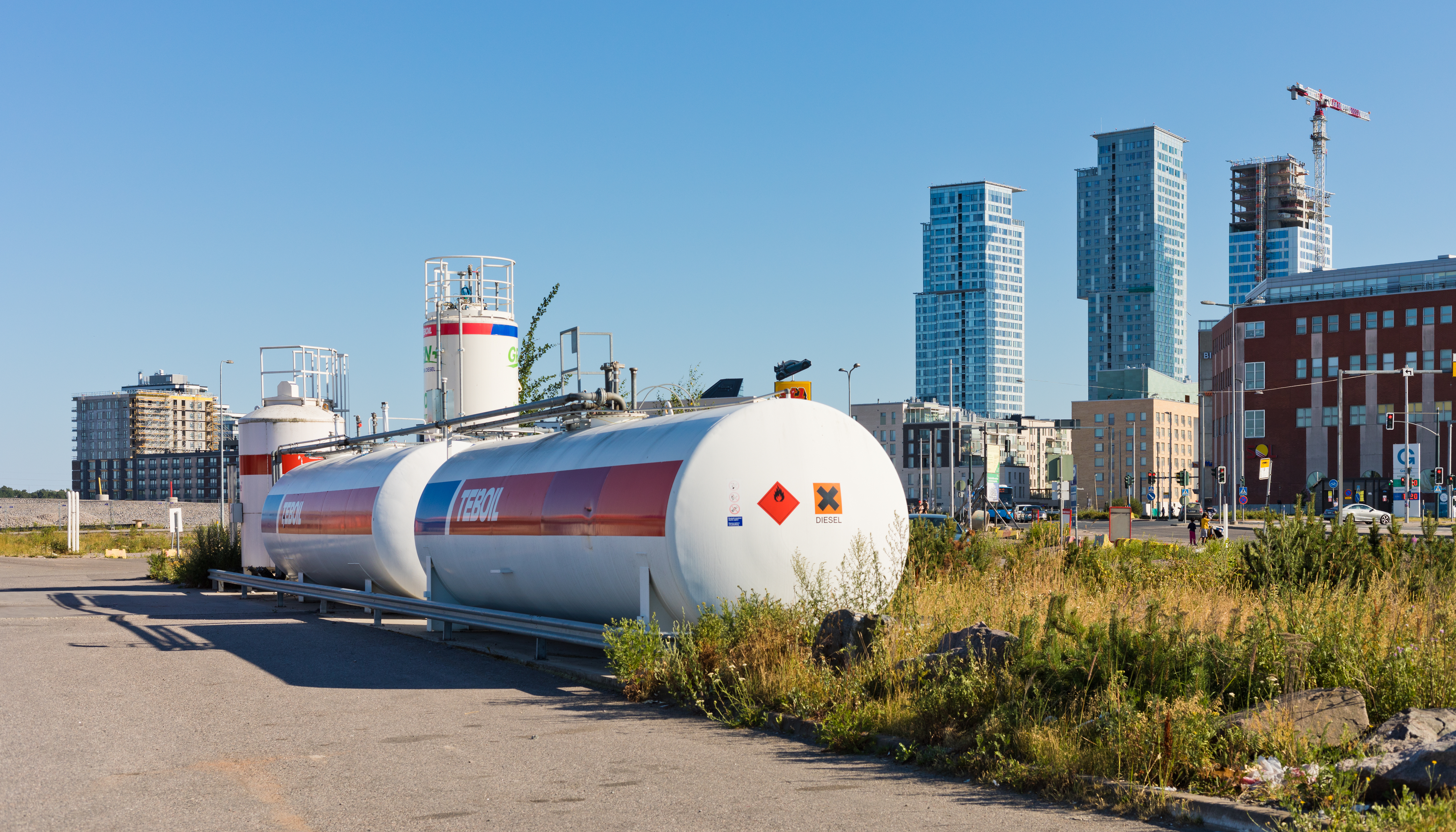
Large diesel fuel tanks in Sörnäinen, Helsinki, Finland

In the US, diesel is recommended to be stored in a yellow container to differentiate it from kerosene, which is typically kept in blue containers, and petrol ("gasoline"), which is typically kept in red containers. In the UK, diesel is normally stored in a black container to differentiate it from unleaded or leaded petrol, which are stored in green and red containers, respectively.

Ethylene-vinyl acetate (EVA) is added to diesel as a "cold flow improver". 50–500 ppm of EVA inhibits crystallization of waxes, which can block fuel filters. Antifoaming agents (silicones), antioxidants (e.g. butylated hydroxytoluene), and metal deactivating agents are other additives. Their use is dictated by the particular composition of and storage plans for diesel fuels. Each is added at the 5–50 ppm level.

== Standards ==
The diesel engine is a multifuel engine and can run on a huge variety of fuels. However, development of high-performance, high-speed diesel engines for cars and lorries in the 1930s meant that a proper fuel specifically designed for such engines was needed: diesel fuel. In order to ensure consistent quality, diesel fuel is standardised; the first standards were introduced after World War II. Typically, a standard defines certain properties of the fuel, such as cetane number, density, flash point, sulphur content, or biodiesel content. Diesel fuel standards include:

Diesel fuel

- EN 590 (European Union)
- ASTM D975 (United States)
- GOST R 52368 (Russia; equivalent to EN 590)
- NATO F 54 (NATO; equivalent to EN 590)
- DIN 51601 (West Germany; obsolete)

Biodiesel fuel

- EN 14214 (European Union)
- ASTM D6751 (United States)
- CAN/CGSB-3.524 (Canada)

== Measurements and pricing ==
=== Cetane number ===
The principal measure of diesel fuel quality is its cetane number. A cetane number is a measure of the delay of ignition of a diesel fuel. A higher cetane number indicates that the fuel ignites more readily when sprayed into hot compressed air. European (EN 590 standard) road diesel has a minimum cetane number of 51. Fuels with higher cetane numbers, normally "premium" diesel fuels with additional cleaning agents and some synthetic content, are available in some markets.

=== Fuel value and price ===
About 86.1% of diesel fuel mass is carbon, and when burned, it offers a net heating value of 43.1 MJ/kg as opposed to 43.2 MJ/kg for petrol. Due to the higher density, diesel fuel offers a higher volumetric energy density: the density of EN 590 diesel fuel is defined as 0.820 to 0.845 kg/L (6.84 to 7.05 lb/US gal) at 15 °C (59 °F), about 9.0–13.9% more than EN 228 petrol's 0.720–0.775 kg/L (6.01–6.47 lb/US gal) at 15 °C, which should be put into consideration when comparing volumetric fuel prices. The CO_{2} emissions from diesel are 73.25 g/MJ, just slightly lower than for petrol at 73.38 g/MJ.

Diesel fuel is generally simpler to refine from petroleum than petrol. Additional refining is required to remove sulfur, which contributes to a sometimes higher cost. In many parts of the United States and throughout the United Kingdom and Australia, diesel fuel may be priced higher than petrol per gallon or litre. Reasons for higher-priced diesel include the shutdown of some refineries in the Gulf of Mexico, diversion of mass refining capacity to petrol production, and a recent transfer to ultra-low-sulfur diesel (ULSD), which causes infrastructural complications. In Sweden, a diesel fuel designated as MK-1 (class 1 environmental diesel) is also being sold. This is a ULSD that has a lower aromatics content, with a limit of 5%. This fuel is slightly more expensive to produce than regular ULSD. In Germany, the fuel tax on diesel fuel is about 28% lower than the petrol fuel tax.

=== Taxation ===
Diesel fuel is similar to heating oil, which is used in central heating. In Europe, the United States, and Canada, taxes on diesel fuel are higher than on heating oil due to the fuel tax, and in those areas, heating oil is marked with fuel dyes and trace chemicals to prevent and detect tax fraud. "Untaxed" diesel (sometimes called "off-road diesel" or "red diesel" due to its red dye) is available in some countries for use primarily in agricultural applications, such as fuel for tractors, recreational and utility vehicles or other noncommercial vehicles that do not use public roads. This fuel may have sulfur levels that exceed the limits for road use in some countries (e.g. US).

This untaxed diesel is dyed red for identification, and the use of this untaxed diesel fuel for a typically taxed purpose (such as driving use) can be fined (e.g. US$10,000 in the US). In the United Kingdom, Belgium and the Netherlands, it is known as red diesel (or gas oil), and is also used in agricultural vehicles, home heating tanks, refrigeration units on vans/trucks which contain perishable items such as food and medicine, and for marine craft. Diesel fuel, or marked gas oil is dyed green in the Republic of Ireland and Norway. The term "diesel-engined road vehicle" (DERV) is used in the UK as a synonym for unmarked road diesel fuel. In India, taxes on diesel fuel are lower than on petrol, as the majority of the transportation for grain and other essential commodities across the country runs on diesel.

Taxes on biodiesel in the US vary between states. Some states (Texas, for example) have no tax on biodiesel and a reduced tax on biodiesel blends equivalent to the amount of biodiesel in the blend, so that B20 fuel is taxed 20% less than pure petrodiesel. Other states, such as North Carolina, tax biodiesel (in any blended configuration) the same as petrodiesel, although they have introduced new incentives to producers and users of all biofuels.

== Uses ==
Diesel fuel is mostly used in high-speed diesel engines, especially motor-vehicle (e.g. car, lorry) diesel engines, but not all diesel engines run on diesel fuel. For example, large two-stroke watercraft engines typically use heavy fuel oils instead of diesel fuel, and certain types of diesel engines, such as MAN M-System engines, are designed to run on petrol with knock resistances of up to 86 RON. On the other hand, gas turbine and some other types of internal combustion engines, and external combustion engines, can also be designed to take diesel fuel.

The viscosity requirement of diesel fuel is usually specified at 40 °C (104 °F). A disadvantage of diesel fuel in cold climates is that its viscosity increases as the temperature decreases, changing it into a gel (see Compression Ignition – Gelling) that cannot flow in fuel systems. Special low-temperature diesel contains additives to keep it liquid at lower temperatures.

=== On-road vehicles ===
Trucks and buses, which were often otto-powered in the 1920s through 1950s, are now almost exclusively diesel-powered. Due to its ignition characteristics, diesel fuel is thus widely used in these vehicles. Since diesel fuel is not well-suited for otto engines, passenger cars, which often use otto or otto-derived engines, typically run on petrol instead of diesel fuel. However, especially in Europe and India, many passenger cars have, due to better engine efficiency, diesel engines, and thus run on regular diesel fuel.

=== Railroad ===
Diesel displaced coal and fuel oil for steam-powered vehicles in the latter half of the 20th century, and is now used almost exclusively for the combustion engines of self-powered rail vehicles (locomotives and railcars).

=== Aircraft ===
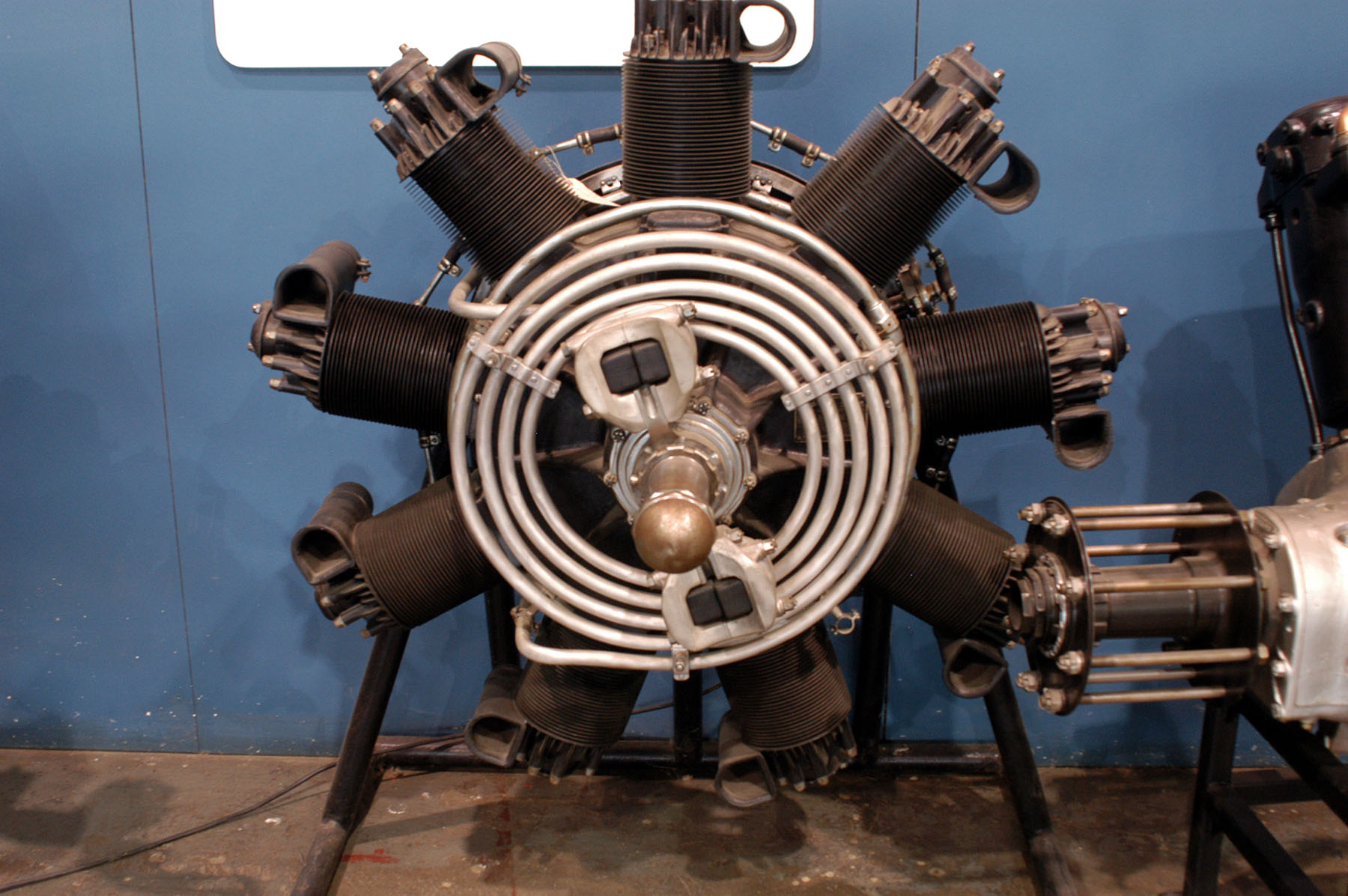
Packard DR-980 9-cylinder diesel aircraft engine, used in the first diesel-engine airplane

In general, diesel engines are not well-suited for planes and helicopters. This is because of the diesel engine's comparatively low power-to-mass ratio, meaning that diesel engines are typically rather heavy, which is a disadvantage in aircraft. Therefore, there is little need for using diesel fuel in aircraft, and diesel fuel is not commercially used as aviation fuel. Instead, petrol (Avgas), and jet fuel (e. g. Jet A-1) are used. However, especially in the 1920s and 1930s, numerous series-production aircraft diesel engines that ran on fuel oils were made, because they had several advantages: their fuel consumption was low, they were reliable, not prone to catching fire, and required minimal maintenance. The introduction of petrol direct injection in the 1930s outweighed these advantages, and aircraft diesel engines quickly fell out of use. With improvements in power-to-mass ratios of diesel engines, several on-road diesel engines have been converted to and certified for aircraft use since the early 21st century. These engines typically run on Jet A-1 aircraft fuel (but can also run on diesel fuel). Jet A-1 has ignition characteristics similar to diesel fuel, and is thus suited for certain (but not all) diesel engines.

=== Military vehicles ===
Until World War II, several military vehicles, especially those that required high engine performance (armored fighting vehicles, for example the M26 Pershing or Panther tanks), used conventional otto engines and ran on petrol. Ever since World War II, several military vehicles with diesel engines have been made, capable of running on diesel fuel. This is because diesel engines are more fuel efficient, and diesel fuel is less prone to catching fire. Some of these diesel-powered vehicles (such as the Leopard 1 or MAN 630) still ran on petrol, and some military vehicles were still made with otto engines (e. g. Ural-375 or Unimog 404), incapable of running on diesel fuel.

=== Tractors and heavy equipment ===
Today's tractors and heavy equipment are mostly diesel-powered. Among tractors, only the smaller classes may also offer petrol-fuelled engines. The dieselization of tractors and heavy equipment began in Germany before World War II but was unusual in the United States until after that war. During the 1950s and 1960s, it progressed in the US as well. Diesel fuel is commonly used in oil and gas extracting equipment, although some locales use electric or natural gas powered equipment.

Tractors and heavy equipment were often multifuel in the 1920s through 1940s, running either spark-ignition and low-compression engines, akroyd engines, or diesel engines. Thus many farm tractors of the era could burn petrol, alcohol, kerosene, and any light grade of fuel oil such as heating oil, or tractor vaporising oil, according to whichever was most affordable in a region at any given time. On US farms during this era, the name "distillate" often referred to any of the aforementioned light fuel oils. Spark ignition engines did not start as well on distillate, so typically a small auxiliary petrol tank was used for cold starting, and the fuel valves were adjusted several minutes later, after warm-up, to transition to distillate. Engine accessories such as vaporizers and radiator shrouds were also used, both with the aim of capturing heat, because when such an engine was run on distillate, it ran better when both it and the air it inhaled were warmer rather than at ambient temperature. Dieselization with dedicated diesel engines (high-compression with mechanical fuel injection and compression ignition) replaced such systems and made more efficient use of the diesel fuel being burned.

=== Other uses ===
Poor quality diesel fuel has been used as an extraction agent for liquid–liquid extraction of palladium from nitric acid mixtures. Such use has been proposed as a means of separating the fission product palladium from PUREX raffinate which comes from used nuclear fuel. In this system of solvent extraction, the hydrocarbons of the diesel act as the diluent while the dialkyl sulfides act as the extractant. This extraction operates by a solvation mechanism. So far, neither a pilot plant nor full scale plant has been constructed to recover palladium, rhodium or ruthenium from nuclear wastes created by the use of nuclear fuel.

Diesel fuel is often used as the main ingredient in oil-base mud drilling fluid. The advantage of using diesel is its low cost and its ability to drill a wide variety of difficult strata, including shale, salt and gypsum formations. Diesel-oil mud is typically mixed with up to 40% brine water. Due to health, safety and environmental concerns, Diesel-oil mud is often replaced with vegetable, mineral, or synthetic food-grade oil-base drilling fluids, although diesel-oil mud is still in widespread use in certain regions.

During development of rocket engines in Germany during World War II J-2 Diesel fuel was used as the fuel component in several engines including the BMW 109-718. J-2 diesel fuel was also used as a fuel for gas turbine engines.

== Chemical analysis ==
=== Chemical composition ===
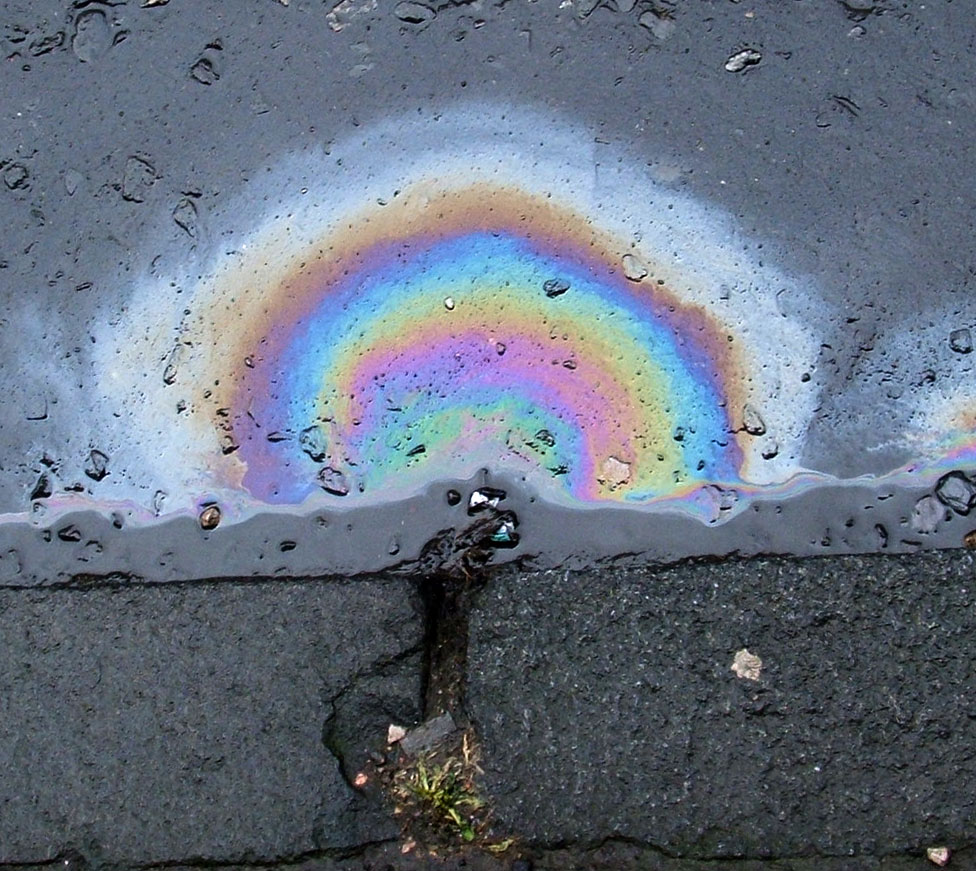
Diesel does not mix with water. This picture also showcases the phenomenon of thin-film interference.

In the United States, petroleum-derived diesel is composed of about 75% saturated hydrocarbons (primarily paraffins including n, iso, and cycloparaffins), and 25% aromatic hydrocarbons (including naphthalenes and alkylbenzenes). The average chemical formula for common diesel fuel is C_{12}H_{23}, ranging approximately from C_{10}H_{20} to C_{15}H_{28}.

=== Chemical properties ===
Most diesel fuels freeze at common winter temperatures, while the temperatures greatly vary. Petrodiesel typically freezes around temperatures of −8.1 °C (17.4 °F), whereas biodiesel freezes between temperatures of 2 to 15 °C (36 to 59 °F). The viscosity of diesel noticeably increases as the temperature decreases, changing it into a gel at temperatures of −19 to −15 °C (−2 to 5 °F), that cannot flow in fuel systems. Conventional diesel fuels vaporise at temperatures between 149 °C and 371 °C.

Conventional diesel flash points vary between 52 and 96 °C, which makes it safer than petrol and unsuitable for spark-ignition engines. Due to the way Diesel engines initiate combustion by injecting fuel once the cylinder charge has reached temperatures well above the fuel's flash point, the precise flash point of a diesel fuel has (unlike with petrol) little relation to its performance in an engine nor to its auto ignition behaviour.

== Carbon dioxide formation ==
As a good approximation the chemical formula of diesel is C_{n}H_{2n}. Diesel is a mixture of different molecules. As carbon has a molar mass of 12 g/mol and hydrogen has a molar mass of about 1 g/mol, so the fraction by weight of carbon in EN 590 diesel fuel is roughly 12/14.

The reaction of diesel combustion is given by:

2 C_{n}H_{2n} + 3n O_{2} ⇌ 2n CO_{2} + 2n H_{2}O

Carbon dioxide has a molar mass of 44 g/mol as it consists of 2 atoms of oxygen (16 g/mol) and 1 atom of carbon (12 g/mol). So 12 g of carbon yields 44 g of carbon dioxide.

Diesel has a density of 838 g per litre.

Putting everything together the mass of carbon dioxide that is produced by burning 1 litre of diesel fuel can be calculated as:

$0.838 kg/L \cdot {\frac{12}{14}}\cdot {\frac{44}{12}}= 2.63 kg/L$

The figure obtained with this estimation is close to the values found in the literature.

For petrol, with a density of 0.75 kg/L and a ratio of carbon to hydrogen atoms of about 6 to 14, the estimated value of carbon emission if 1 litre of petrol is burnt gives:

$0.75 kg/L \cdot {\frac{6 \cdot 12}{6\cdot 12 + 14}\cdot 1} \cdot {\frac{44}{12}}= 2.3 kg/L$

== Hazards ==
=== Environment hazards of sulfur ===
In the past, diesel fuel contained higher quantities of sulfur. European emission standards and preferential taxation have forced oil refineries to dramatically reduce the level of sulfur in diesel fuels. In the European Union, the sulfur content has dramatically reduced during the last 20 years. Automotive diesel fuel is covered in the European Union by standard EN 590. In the 1990s specifications allowed a content of 2000 ppm max of sulfur, reduced to a limit of 350 ppm by the beginning of the 21st century with the introduction of Euro 3 specifications. The limit was lowered with the introduction of Euro 4 by 2006 to 50 ppm (ULSD, Ultra Low Sulfur Diesel). The standard for diesel fuel in force in Europe as of 2009 is the Euro 5, with a maximum content of 10 ppm.

Emission standard	At latest	Sulfur content	Cetane number
N/a	1 January 1994	max. 2000 ppm	min. 49
Euro 2	1 January 1996	max. 500 ppm	min. 49
Euro 3	1 January 2001	max. 350 ppm	min. 51
Euro 4	1 January 2006	max. 50 ppm	min. 51
Euro 5	1 January 2009	max. 10 ppm	min. 51

In the United States, more stringent emission standards have been adopted with the transition to ULSD starting in 2006, and becoming mandatory on June 1, 2010 (see also diesel exhaust).

=== Algae, microbes, and water contamination ===
There has been much discussion and misunderstanding of algae in diesel fuel. Algae need light to live and grow. As there is no sunlight in a closed fuel tank, no algae can survive, but some microbes can survive and feed on the diesel fuel.

These microbes form a colony that lives at the interface of fuel and water. They grow quite fast in warmer temperatures. They can even grow in cold weather when fuel tank heaters are installed. Parts of the colony can break off and clog the fuel lines and fuel filters.

Water in fuel can damage a fuel injection pump. Some diesel fuel filters also trap water. Water contamination in diesel fuel can lead to freezing while in the fuel tank. The freezing water that saturates the fuel will sometimes clog the fuel injector pump. Once the water inside the fuel tank has started to freeze, gelling is more likely to occur. When the fuel is gelled it is not effective until the temperature is raised and the fuel returns to a liquid state.

=== Road hazard ===
Diesel is less flammable than petrol. However, because it evaporates slowly, any spills on a roadway can pose a slip hazard to vehicles. After the light fractions have evaporated, a greasy slick is left on the road which reduces tire grip and traction, and can cause vehicles to skid. The loss of traction is similar to that encountered on black ice, resulting in especially dangerous situations for two-wheeled vehicles, such as motorcycles and bicycles, in roundabouts.

== See also ==
- Common ethanol fuel mixtures
- Biodiesel
- Diesel automobile racing
- Dieselisation
- Gasoline gallon equivalent
- Hybrid vehicle
- Liquid fuel
- List of diesel automobiles
- Rolling coal
- Turbo-diesel
- United States v. Imperial Petroleum, Inc.
- Winter diesel fuel
