= Hexadecane =

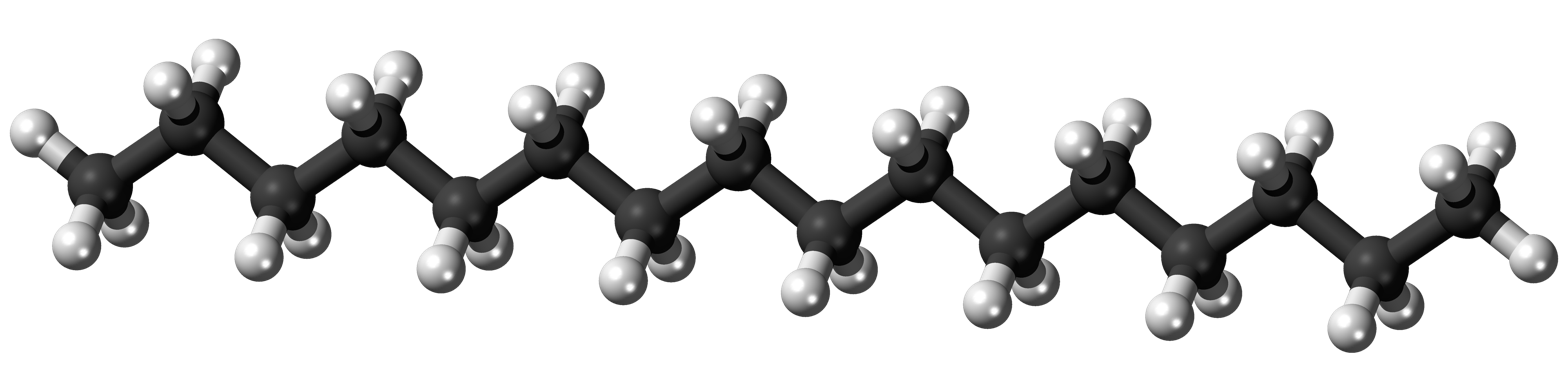

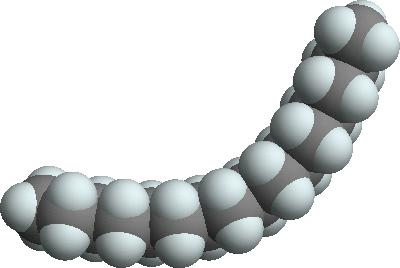

Names
- Preferred IUPAC name Hexadecane
- Other names Cetane

Identifiers
CAS Number	544-76-3
3D model (JSmol)	Interactive image
Beilstein Reference	1736592
ChEBI	CHEBI:45296
ChEMBL	ChEMBL134994
ChemSpider	10540
ECHA InfoCard	100.008.072
EC Number	208-878-9
Gmelin Reference	103739
MeSH	n-hexadecane
PubChem CID	11006
UNII	F8Z00SHP6Q
CompTox Dashboard (EPA)	DTXSID0027195
- InChI: InChI=1S/C16H34/c1-3-5-7-9-11-13-15-16-14-12-10-8-6-4-2/h3-16H2,1-2H3 Key: DCAYPVUWAIABOU-UHFFFAOYSA-N
- SMILES: CCCCCCCCCCCCCCCC

Properties
Chemical formula	C_{16}H_{34}
Molar mass	226.448 g·mol^{−1}
Appearance	Colourless liquid
Odor	Gasoline-like to odorless
Density	0.77 g/cm^{3}
Melting point	18.18 °C (64.72 °F; 291.33 K)
Boiling point	286.9 °C (548.4 °F; 560.0 K)
log P	8.859
Vapor pressure	< 0.1 mbar (20 °C)
Henry's law constant (k_{H})	43 nmol Pa^{−1} kg^{−1}
Magnetic susceptibility (χ)	−187.6·10^{−6} cm^{3}/mol
Thermal conductivity	0.140 W/(m·K)
Refractive index (n_{D})	1.4329
Viscosity	3.03 mPa·s

Thermochemistry
Heat capacity (C)	501.6 J K^{−1} mol^{−1}
Std enthalpy of formation (Δ_{f}H^{⦵}_{298})	−456.1 kJ mol^{−1}

Hazards
- GHS labelling
Pictograms	(GHS07: Exclamation mark)
Signal word	Warning
Hazard statements	H304
Precautionary statements	P301+P316, P331, P405, P501
Flash point	136 °C (277 °F; 409 K)
Autoignition temperature	202 °C (396 °F; 475 K)

Related compounds
Related alkanes	Pentadecane; Heptadecane
- Except where otherwise noted, data are given for materials in their standard state (at 25 °C [77 °F], 100 kPa). verify (what is ?) Infobox references

Hexadecane (also called cetane) is an alkane hydrocarbon with the chemical formula C_{16}H_{34}. Hexadecane consists of a chain of 16 carbon atoms, with three hydrogen atoms bonded to the two end carbon atoms, and two hydrogens bonded to each of the 14 other carbon atoms. Isohexadecane is a branch chained isomer of hexadecane.

== Cetane number ==
Cetane is often used as a shorthand for cetane number, a measure of the combustion of diesel fuel. Cetane ignites very easily under compression; for this reason, it is assigned a cetane number of 100, and serves as a reference for other fuel mixtures.

== Hexadecyl radical ==
Hexadecyl, or cetyl, is an alkyl radical of carbon and hydrogen derived from hexadecane, with formula C_{16}H_{33} and with mass 225.433, occurring especially in cetyl alcohol. It confers strong hydrophobicity on molecules containing it. Carboplatin modified with hexadecyl and polyethylene glycol has increased liposolubility and PEGylation, and is proposed to useful in chemotherapy, specifically non-small-cell lung cancer.

Hexadecyl was used from 1982 for radiolabelling, and this continues to be useful, for example for radiolabelling exosomes and hydrogels, and for positron emission tomography.

Hexadecyl platelet-activating factor has profound effects on the lung, and hexadecyl glyceryl ether participates in the biosynthesis of plasmalogens.

== See also ==
- Cetane index
- Isocetane
- Higher alkanes

== Cited sources ==
- Haynes, William M., ed. (2016). CRC Handbook of Chemistry and Physics (97th ed.). CRC Press. ISBN 9781498754293.
