= 2-Methylnaphthalene =

Names
- Preferred IUPAC name 2-Methylnaphthalene
- Other names β-methylnaphthalene

Identifiers
CAS Number	91-57-6
3D model (JSmol)	Interactive image
ChemSpider	6788
ECHA InfoCard	100.001.890
PubChem CID	7055
UNII	S8MCX3C16H
CompTox Dashboard (EPA)	DTXSID4020878
- InChI: InChI=1S/C11H10/c1-9-6-7-10-4-2-3-5-11(10)8-9/h2-8H,1H3 Key: QIMMUPPBPVKWKM-UHFFFAOYSA-N; InChI=1/C11H10/c1-9-6-7-10-4-2-3-5-11(10)8-9/h2-8H,1H3 Key: QIMMUPPBPVKWKM-UHFFFAOYAY
- SMILES: Cc1ccc2ccccc2c1

Properties
Chemical formula	C_{11}H_{10}
Molar mass	142.201 g·mol^{−1}
Appearance	Waxy white solid
Melting point	35 °C (95 °F; 308 K)
Boiling point	241.1 °C (466.0 °F; 514.2 K)
Magnetic susceptibility (χ)	−102.6·10^{−6} cm^{3}/mol
- Except where otherwise noted, data are given for materials in their standard state (at 25 °C [77 °F], 100 kPa). Infobox references

2-Methylnaphthalene is a simple polycyclic aromatic hydrocarbon (PAH). It is generally isolated from coal tar, of which it is a minor component.

== Uses ==
The quinone derivative, Menadione, can be formed by the oxidation of 2-methylnaphthalene and finds use as a synthetic form of vitamin K.

== Astrochemistry ==
According to NASA, over 20% of the carbon in the universe may be associated with PAHs, possible starting materials for the formation of life. PAHs seem to have been formed shortly after the Big Bang, are abundant in the universe, and are associated with new stars and exoplanets.

== Safety ==
The LD50 for 2-methylnaphthalene is low, being 3850 mg/kg (rats).

== See also ==
- 1-Methylnaphthalene
