= Cetane number =

Performance measurement of diesel fuel

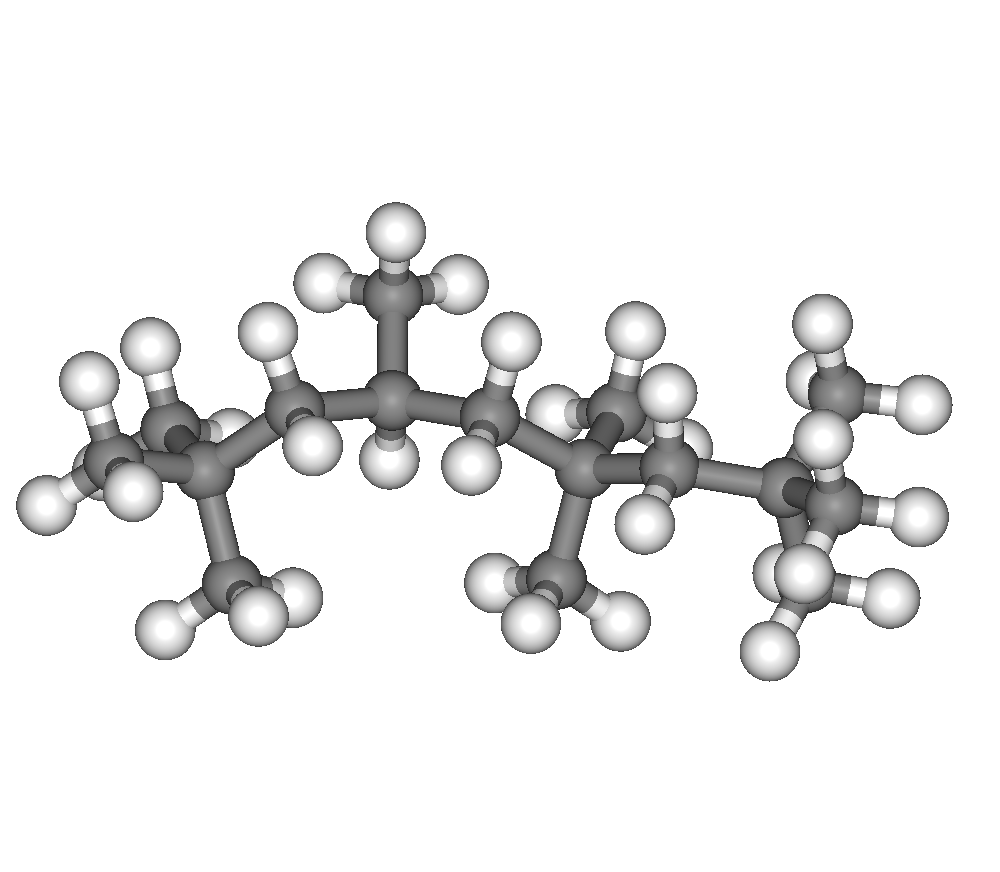
Cetane has a cetane number defined to be 100, while isocetane's (here) measured cetane number is 15

Cetane number (cetane rating, CN) is an indicator of the combustion speed of diesel fuel and compression needed for ignition. It plays a similar role for diesel as octane rating does for gasoline. The CN is an important factor in determining the quality of diesel fuel, but not the only one; other measurements of diesel fuel's quality include (but are not limited to) energy content, density, lubricity, cold-flow properties and sulfur content.

== Definition ==
The cetane number of a fuel is defined by finding a blend of cetane and isocetane with the same ignition delay. Cetane has a cetane number defined to be 100, while isocetane's measured cetane number is 15, replacing the former reference fuel alpha-methylnaphthalene, which was assigned a cetane number of 0. Once the blend is known, the cetane number is calculated as a volume-weighted average, rounded to the nearest whole number, of cetane's 100 and isocetane's 15.

cetane number = % n-cetane + 0.15(% isocetane)

Cetane number is an inverse function of a fuel's ignition delay, the time period between the start of ignition and the first identifiable pressure increase during combustion of the fuel. In a particular diesel engine, higher cetane fuels will have shorter ignition delay periods than lower cetane fuels. Cetane numbers are only used for the relatively light distillate diesel oils. For heavy (residual) fuel oil two other scales are used, CCAI and CII.

== Typical values ==
Generally, diesel engines operate well with a CN from 48 to 50. Fuels with lower cetane number have longer ignition delays, requiring more time for the fuel combustion process to be completed. Hence, higher speed diesel engines operate more effectively with higher cetane number fuels.

In Europe, diesel cetane numbers were set at a minimum of 38 in 1994 and 40 in 2000. The standard for diesel sold in European Union, Iceland, Norway and Switzerland is defined by standard EN 590. Since 1 January 2001 EN 590 demands a minimum cetane index of 46 and a minimum cetane number of 51. Premium diesel fuel can have a cetane number as high as 60.

In Finland, premium diesel fuels sold by filling station chains St1 (Diesel Plus), Shell (containing GTL) and ABC (Smart Diesel) have a minimum cetane number of 60 with the typical value being at 63. Neste MY Renewable Diesel sold in Finland has a minimum cetane number of 70.

In North America, most states adopt ASTM D975 as their diesel fuel standard and the minimum cetane number is set at 40, with typical values in the 42-45 range. Premium diesel fuel may or may not have higher cetane number depending on the supplier. Premium diesel often use additives to improve CN and lubricity, detergents to clean the fuel injectors and minimize carbon deposits, water dispersants, and other additives depending on geographical and seasonal needs.. California diesel fuel has a minimum cetane of 53. Under the Texas Low Emission Diesel (TxLED) program there are 110 counties where diesel fuel must have a cetane number of 48 or greater, or else must use an approved alternative formulation or comply with the designated alternative limits.

Neste MY Renewable Diesel sold in North America has a cetane number of 70+.

== Additives ==
Alkyl nitrates (principally 2-ethylhexyl nitrate) and di-tert-butyl peroxide are used as additives to raise the cetane number.

== Alternative fuels ==
Biodiesel from vegetable oil sources have been recorded as having a cetane number range of 46 to 52, and animal-fat based biodiesels cetane numbers range from 56 to 60. Dimethyl ether is a potential diesel fuel as it has a high cetane rating (55-60) and can be produced as a biofuel. Most simple ethers, including liquid ones, such as diethyl ether can be used as diesel fuels, although the lubricity can be of concern.

== Chemical relevance ==
Cetane is the hydrocarbon with chemical formulas C_{16}H_{34} and specifically the structural formula CH_{3}(CH_{2})_{14}CH_{3}. Also named n-hexadecane, it is an unbranched saturated alkane. Cetane ignites with a short delay under compression, and is assigned a cetane number of 100. Alpha-methylnaphthalene, which has a long delay period, was assigned a cetane number of 0, but has been replaced as a reference fuel by 2,3,4,5,6,7,8-heptamethylnonane, which is assigned a cetane number of 15. All other hydrocarbons in diesel fuel are indexed to cetane as to how rapidly they ignite under compression, i.e. diesel engine conditions. Since hundreds of components comprise diesel fuel, the overall cetane number of that fuel is the average cetane quality of all the components. High-cetane components have a disproportionate influence, hence the use of high-cetane additives.

== Measuring cetane number ==
Cetane numbers are rather difficult to measure accurately, as it requires a special diesel engine called a Cooperative Fuel Research (CFR) engine. Under standard test conditions, the operator of the CFR engine uses a manual-wheel to increase the compression ratio (and therefore the peak pressure within the cylinder) of the engine until the time between fuel injection and ignition is 2.407 ms. The resulting cetane number is then calculated by determining which mixture of cetane (hexadecane) and isocetane (2,2,4,4,6,8,8-heptamethylnonane) will result in the same ignition delay.

=== Ignition Quality Tester (IQT) ===
Another reliable method of measuring the derived cetane number (DCN) of diesel fuel is the Ignition Quality Tester (IQT). This instrument applies a simpler, more robust approach to CN measurement than the CFR. Fuel is injected into a constant volume combustion chamber at approximately 575 °C and 310 psi (21 bar). The time between the start of injection and the recovery of the combustion chamber pressure to 310 psi (21 bar) is defined as the ignition delay. This measured ignition delay is then used to calculate the DCN of the fuel. The fuel's DCN is then calculated using an empirical inverse relationship to ignition delay. Because of the reproducibility, material cost, and speed of the IQT, this has been the definitive source for DCN measurements of fuels since the late 2000s.

=== Fuel ignition tester ===
Another reliable method of measuring the derived cetane number of diesel fuel is the Fuel Ignition Tester (FIT). This instrument applies a simpler, more robust approach to CN measurement than the CFR. Fuel is injected into a constant volume combustion chamber in which the ambient temperature is approximately 575 °C. The fuel combusts, and the high rate of pressure change within the chamber defines the start of combustion. The ignition delay of the fuel can then be calculated as the time elapsed between the start of fuel injection and the start of combustion. The fuel's derived cetane number can then be calculated using an empirical inverse relationship to ignition delay.

=== Cetane index ===
Another statistic used by fuel-users to control quality is the cetane index (CI), which is a calculated number based on the density and a distillation range of the fuel. There are various versions of this, depending on whether metric or Imperial units are used, and the number of distillation points that are used. These days most oil companies use the '4-point method', ASTM D4737, based on density and 10% 50% and 90% recovery temperatures. The '2-point method' is defined in ASTM D976 and uses just density and the 50% recovery temperature. This 2-point method tends to overestimate the cetane index and is not recommended. Cetane index calculations cannot account for cetane improver additives and therefore do not measure the total cetane number for additized diesel fuels. Diesel engine operation is primarily related to the actual cetane number, and the cetane index is merely an estimation of the base (unadditized) cetane number.

=== Industry standards ===
The industry standards for measuring cetane number are ASTM D613 (ISO 5165) for the CFR engine, D6890 for the IQT, and D7170 for the FIT.

== See also ==
- NExBTL
- Octane rating
