= W. Thomas Rice =

William T. Rice
- Born: June 13, 1912; Westmoreland County, Virginia
- Died: February 5, 2006 (aged 93); Richmond, Virginia
- Other names: W. Thomas Rice
- Occupation: railroad executive
- Known for: creation of CSX Transportation

William Thomas Rice (June 13, 1912 – February 5, 2006) was an American railroad executive from Virginia. He worked in railroading throughout his life, and also served in the Army Reserves where he became a major general. Along with Hays T. Watkins, Rice's work led to the formation of CSX Transportation in 1980.

== Career ==
Rice was born in 1912 in Westmoreland County, Virginia. His career started as a track inspector for the Pennsylvania Railroad in 1934, after graduating at the top of his civil engineering class at Virginia Tech. By 1955, he became president of the Richmond, Fredericksburg and Potomac Railroad. In 1957, he was made president of the Atlantic Coast Line Railroad, succeeding Champ Davis. By 1967, he was named president, director and CEO of the Seaboard Coast Line Railroad, the product of merging the ACL with the Seaboard Air Line Railroad. Rice rose to chairman of SCL parent Seaboard Coast Line Industries, and the Family Lines System which included SCL. In 1980, Rice and Hays T. Watkins guided the creation of CSX Corporation by merging the Chessie System and the SCL. After the merger was complete, he was named chairman emeritus.

== Honors ==
Rice earned many honors, including "Transportation Man of the Year" in 1972 and "Railroad Man of the Year" in 1975. In 1987, CSX's classification yard in Waycross, Georgia, was named for him. In 2000, the non-profit Virginians for High Speed Rail created an award "The W. Thomas Rice Rail Renaissance Award" named in his honor which was presented to individuals for their leadership in rail transportation development.

== Personal life ==
William Thomas Rice married Jaqueline Johnston and together they had two children, John Thomas Rice and Jaqueline "Lynn" Rice, over 67 years of marriage. He lost his son to cancer in 2003. Rice, who died in 2006, was survived by his daughter, daughter-in-law Grace, seven grandchildren, and twelve great-grandchildren.

Business positions
Preceded by Norman Call	President of Richmond, Fredericksburg and Potomac Railroad; 1955 – 1957	Succeeded by Wirt P. Marks Jr.
Preceded by Champ Davis	President of Atlantic Coast Line Railroad; 1957 – 1967	Merged into Seaboard Coast Line Railroad
New title	President of Seaboard Coast Line Railroad; 1967 –	Succeeded by
