= Chesapeake and Ohio class H-8 =

Class of 60 American 2-6-6-6 locomotives

Chesapeake and Ohio H-8 class
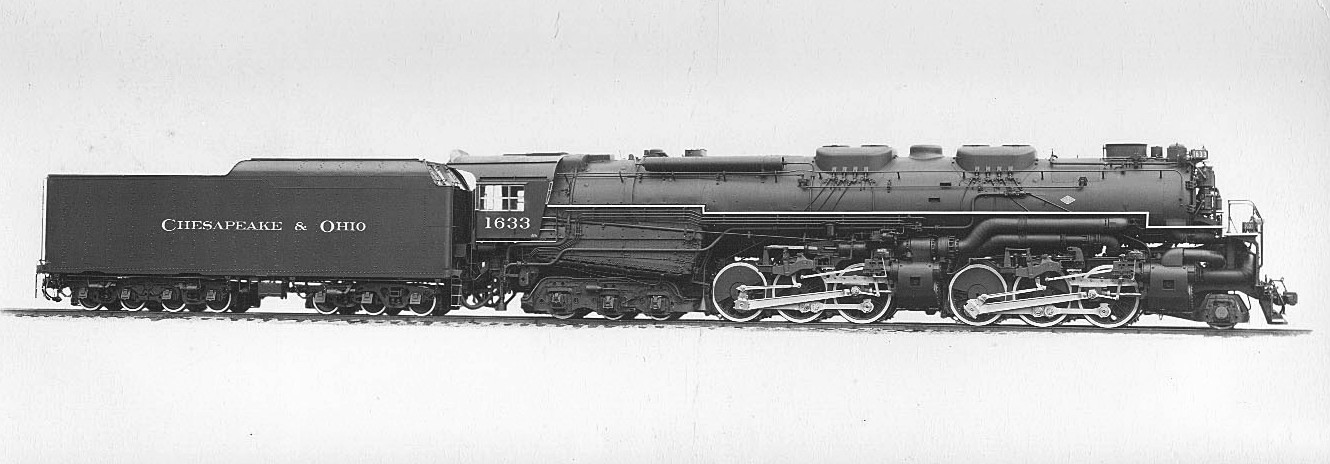
- Builder's card for the Chesapeake and Ohio's 2-6-6-6 "Allegheny" locomotives
Type and origin
- Power type: Steam
- Designer: Advisory Mechanical Committee
- Builder: Lima Locomotive Works
- Order number: 1154, 1162, 1182, 1188, 1205
- Serial number: 7820–7829, 7883–7892, 8613–8622, 8799–8813
- Model: H-8
- Build date: 1941–1944 (1600-1644); 1948 (1645-1659)
- Total produced: 60
Specifications
- Configuration
  - Whyte: 2-6-6-6
- Gauge: 4 ft 8 1/2 in (1,435 mm) standard gauge
- Leading dia.: 36 in (914 mm)
- Driver dia.: 67 in (1,702 mm)
- Trailing dia.: 36 in (914 mm) (lead & intermediate axle); 43 in (1,092 mm) (trail axle)
- Tender wheels: 36 in (914 mm)
- Minimum curve: 319 ft 7 1/2 in (97.42 m) radius/ 18°
- Wheelbase: Locomotive: 62 ft 6 in (19.05 m); Overall: 112 ft 11 in (34.42 m)
- Length: Locomotive: 76 ft 8 3/8 in (23.38 m); Overall: 125 ft 7 7/8 in (38.30 m)
- Width: 11 ft 1 in (3.38 m)
- Height: 16 ft 7 in (5.05 m)
- Frame type: Cast Steel
- Axle load: 86,700 lb (43.4 short tons) (1600-1644); 85,480 lb (42.74 short tons) (1645-1659)
- Adhesive weight: 507,900 lb (254.0 short tons) (1600-1644); 504,010 lb (252.01 short tons) (1645-1659)
- Loco weight: 771,300 lb (385.7 short tons) (1600-1644); 751,830 lb (375.92 short tons) (1645-1659)
- Tender weight: 426,100 lb or 431,700 lb (25-RB); 437,600 lb (25-RA)
- Total weight: 1,183,540 to 1,208,900 lb (592 to 604 short tons)
- Tender type: 25-RA (1607-1609); 25-RB (remaining)
- Fuel type: Coal
- Fuel capacity: 25 tons (50,000 lb)
- Water cap.: 25,000 US gal (95,000 L)
- Sandbox cap.: 12,000 lb (6 short tons)
- Fuel consumption: Up to 8 short tons of coal / hr Up to 14,000 US gal of water / hr
- Firebox
  - Grate area: 135.20 sq ft (12.560 m^{2})
- Boiler
  - Model: Fire Tube
  - Diameter: 109 in (2,769 mm)
  - Tube plates: 23 ft (7 m)
- Boiler pressure: 260 lbf/in^{2} (1.79 MPa)
- Safety valve: Pop, 3 1/2 in (89 mm); 4 per locomotive
- Feedwater heater: Worthington SA; 14,400 or 16,200 US gal/hr cap
- Heating surface
  - Firebox: 600 sq ft (56 m^{2})
  - Tubes and flues: 6,478 sq ft (602 m^{2}) (1600-1644); 6,033 sq ft (560 m^{2}) (1645-1659)
  - Total surface: 7,240 sq ft (673 m^{2}) (1600-1644); 6,795 sq ft (631 m^{2}) (1645-1659)
- Superheater
  - Type: Type E
  - Heating area: 3,186 sq ft (296 m^{2}) (1600-1644); 2,922 sq ft (271 m^{2}) (1645-1659)
- Cylinders: Four
- Cylinder size: 22.5 in × 33 in (572 mm × 838 mm)
- Valve gear: Baker-long travel
- Valve type: Piston valves
- Valve travel: 8 in (203 mm)
- Valve lap: 1 7/16 in (37 mm)
- Valve lead: 3/16 in (5 mm)
- Train heating: Steam heat
- Loco brake: Pneumatic, Schedule 8-ET
- Train brakes: Pneumatic
Performance figures
- Maximum speed: 70 mph (110 km/h)
- Power output: 6,500–7,500 hp (4,800–5,600 kW) @ ~46 mph (74 km/h) (drawbar)
- Tractive effort: 110,211 lbf (490.24 kN)
- Factor of adh.: 4.61 (1600-1644); 4.57 (1645-1659)
Career
- Operators: Chesapeake and Ohio
- Class: H-8
- Numbers: 1600–1659
- Nicknames: Allegheny
- Retired: 1952–1956
- Preserved: 1601, 1604
- Disposition: Nos. 1601 and 1604 on display, remainder scrapped

The Chesapeake and Ohio class H-8 is a class of 60 simple articulated 2-6-6-6 steam locomotives built by the Lima Locomotive Works in Lima, Ohio, between 1941 and 1948. Among the most powerful steam locomotives ever built, the H-8s hauled fast, heavy freight trains for the Chesapeake and Ohio Railway until the mid-1950s. Two were preserved: Nos. 1601 and 1604.

== History ==
In 1939, the C&O was in the market for new locomotive power for its coal traffic. The railroad had 40 Lima-built 2-10-4 T-1s from 1930 that ran across the largely level trackage in Ohio, while 45 2-8-8-2 H-7s built in 1924-26 worked in mountainous territories of West Virginia and Virginia. Instead of ordering more Superpower T-1s, Norfolk & Western's success with their home-built Class A 2-6-6-4 prompted the C&O and Lima to consider a more modern articulated design. Design engineers at Lima argued that expanding the 4-wheeled trailing truck design to a 6-wheel design would permit an even larger firebox, leading to more steaming capability and, by extension, power. Thus was born the 2-6-6-6 wheel arrangement.

Having been sold on the Superpower philosophy through its experience with the T-1, the C&O ordered 60 of the 2-6-6-6 type locomotives, which they designated the H-8, in 5 batches. The first 4 orders encompassed the first 45 locomotives and were delivered between 1941 and 1944; the final order of 15 locomotives arrived in 1948. Cost per locomotive varied between orders: the first order cost around $230,600 per unit; the final one, $392,500 per unit. Purchased to replace the older H-7s on the New River and Alleghany subdivisions, the class received the nickname of "Allegheny".

The railroad actually used the H-8s to haul heavy coal trains on the flatlands of Ohio, supplementing the T-1s, and in the mountains of Virginia and West Virginia, replacing the H-7s which were then relegated to pusher service. Other assignments over the years included manifest freight and the occasional troop or passenger train. With the advent of dieselization in the early 1950s, retirement of the class started in 1952 and ran until the last fire was dropped in 1956.

== Design and performance ==
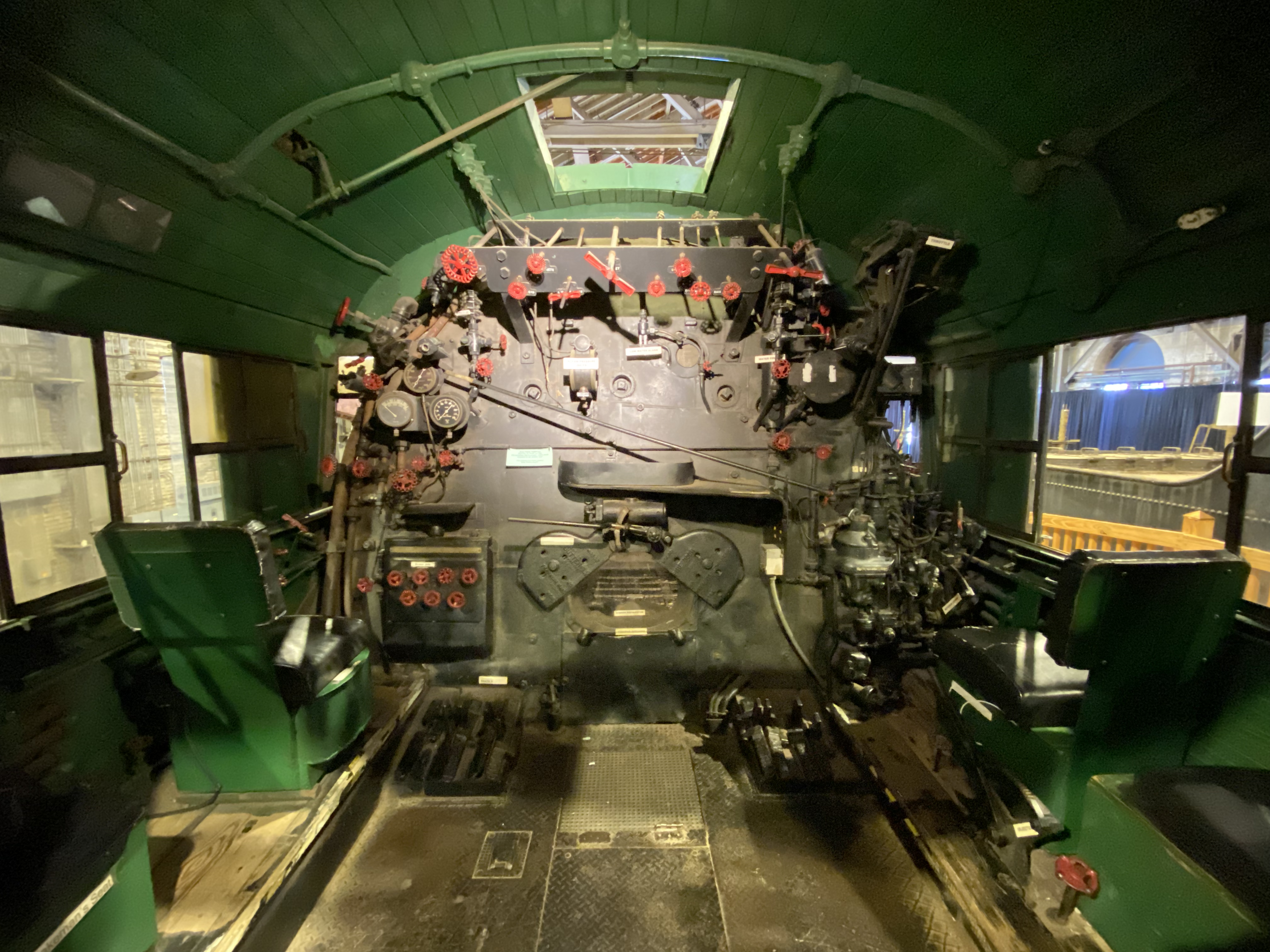
The cab of C&O 1604

The H-8s were intended to be the ultimate expression of the Superpower concept from Lima. Utilizing the 6-wheel trailing truck design permitted the firebox of the locomotive to be longer and deeper, promoting enhanced coal combustion. The firebox was 180 in (4.6 m) in length, and was supplemented by a 118 in (3.0 m) combustion chamber. The boiler was designed to be the maximum possible size that could fit within C&O clearance envelopes. It sported an outside diameter of 109 in (2.8 m), 2 in (51 mm) wider than the Union Pacific Big Boy, carried 23 ft (7.0 m) tubes and flues, one foot longer than Big Boy, and was designed with a maximum operating pressure of 265 psi (1.83 MPa) in mind. In practice, the first safety valve was set at 260 psi (1.8 MPa). This, coupled with two sets of 22.5 in (570 mm) diameter by 33 in (840 mm) stroke cylinders and 67-inch drive wheels yielded 110,200 lbf (490,000 N) of starting tractive effort, calculated at 85% efficiency.

During test runs, the class was shown to exert up to 119,500 lbs of starting tractive effort with drivers worn to 65.5 in (1,660 mm) inches. The 6-wheel trailing truck was designed to accommodate a booster engine which would have increased starting tractive effort by an additional 15,000 lbf (67,000 N), but the 160-car limit on trains on the C&O made the application of a booster to the H-8 unnecessary, and so the locomotives were never equipped. Peak horsepower output occurred between 40 and 50 mph (64 and 80 km/h), with dynamometer car readings ranging from 6,500 to 7,500 hp (4.8 to 5.6 MW). At this output, the locomotive could consume 7 to 8 short tons (6.4 to 7.3 t; 6.3 to 7.1 long tons) of coal and 12,000 to 14,000 US gal (10,000 to 11,700 imp gal; 45,000 to 53,000 L) gallons of water per hour.

Coal was carried to and distributed within the firebox via a Standard Stoker Company type MB automatic stoker, capable of supplying slightly over 12 1/2 short tons (25,000 lb) per hour. Water supply to the boiler was furnished by either the Nathan type 4000C Automatic Restarting injector, sized for 13,000 gallons per hour, on the engineer's side, or a Worthington type SA exhaust steam feedwater system. Locomotives 1600-1644 came equipped with the 6 1/2-SA, sized for 14,400 US gal (12,000 imp gal; 55,000 L) per hour, while 1645-1659 were fitted with the 7-SA, sized for 16,200 US gal (13,500 imp gal; 61,000 L) per hour. The locomotives sported the latest developments in steam technology, and came equipped with front-end multiple valve throttles, type E superheaters, schedule 8-ET brakes, low water alarms, continuous blowdown, automatic lubricators, roller bearings on all axles, etc. The whistle was blown by actuating a Viloco air-operated valve through a button mounted next to the independent brake valve. Baker valve gear controlled the admission of steam into the cylinders. The final batch of locomotives, 1645-1659, featured over-fire air jets in the firebox.

The H-8s also had the heaviest axle load of any steam locomotive, with 86,700 lb (43.4 short tons; 39.3 t) on the lead drive axle. According to the engine profiles from C&O the earliest locomotives weighed in at 771,300 lb (385.7 short tons; 349.9 t) in working order. This unusually high weight led to adhesion factors exceeding 4.5, which meant that the locomotives had a good grip on the rails and were unlikely to slip in regular service. There are claims of engine weights as high as 778,000 lb (389 short tons; 353 t), which if true would make them heavier than the second series of Big Boys. However subsequent re-weighs of early-production H-8s, performed under scrutiny by the builder and the railroad, found them to be less than the 772,250 lb (386.12 short tons; 350.29 t) of the 4884-2s.

The tenders were equally unique. To ensure the locomotive would fit on the largest turntables on the C&O, but still carry enough fuel and water to make division points on the railroad, the tenders were made as short lengthwise and as tall heightwise as possible. This resulted in the use of a 6-wheel truck underneath the 25-ton coal bunker in combination with an 8-wheel truck underneath the 25,000 US gal (21,000 imp gal; 95,000 L) water cistern. The tenders came in two classes. Class 25-RA tenders came equipped with Commonwealth trucks, weighed 437,600 lb (218.8 short tons; 198.5 t) fully loaded, and were only used on 1607-1609. The remaining balance of locomotives were delivered with class 25-RB tenders which came with Buckeye trucks and weighed either 426,100 lb (213.1 short tons; 193.3 t) (1600-1606, 1610-1644), or 431,710 lb (215.86 short tons; 195.82 t) (1645-1659) fully loaded.

== Operation ==
Arriving just in time for the US entry into World War II, the locomotives were quickly assigned to power loaded coal trains over the 13-mile, 0.57% eastward climb from just east of Ronceverte, West Virginia to Alleghany, Virginia. 11,500-ton, 140-car loaded coal trains left Hinton, WV with two H-8s, one at the front and the other shoving from the rear, and typically made the run between Hinton and Alleghany in just under two hours, twice as fast as the H-7s they were replacing. These trains ran at a brisk 45 mph on the comparatively level track out of Hinton to Ronceverte before falling to 20 mph on the ruling grade to the summit. East of Clifton Forge, Virginia, trains were turned over to 2-8-4 K-4s or 2-8-2 K-3 Mikados for the mostly downhill run to Richmond, VA. Running unassisted, H-8s could handle 6,500 tons of merchandise freight in this direction. Returning west from Clifton Forge, the ruling grade was 1.14% and the H-8s were rated for 2,950 tons of empty coal hoppers and manifest freight unassisted.

The H-8s also handled coal trains and time freights from West Virginia to Columbus and Toledo, Ohio alongside the older T-1s. Here, the ruling grade was a slightly stiffer, but much shorter one-and-a-quarter mile of 0.7% trackage west through Limeville, Kentucky leading up to the bridge over the Ohio River, and the H-8s were rated for 13,500 tons (160-cars) unassisted. It was over this division that dynamometer car testing yielded the over-7,000 drawbar horsepower readings. The C&O operating department was rather conservative, placing a 160-car limit on train lengths across the railroad due to yard and siding track length and to prevent unwanted slack action during braking from snapping couplers and breaking trains apart. Were it not for this 160-car limit, the H-8s could have easily handled trains approaching 200 cars and 17,000 tons unassisted over this division, save for the helper districts at Limeville, KY and on the 15-mile, up-to-0.5% grade of Powell Hill just north of Columbus, OH.

23 H-8s were equipped with steam piping for heating passenger trains, and did occasionally power passenger or troop trains. Their comparatively "tall" 67 inch drivers permitted speeds as high as 70 mph on these runs, while their increased tractive effort allowed them to run unassisted on trains with 12 or more cars that would otherwise have been double-headed, and still make good time over the division. H-8 powered military trains (troop, hospital, or prisoner) sometimes ran as long as 20-40 cars (1500-3000 tons).

== No. 1642 boiler explosion ==
On June 9, 1953, No. 1642 suffered a crown sheet failure and subsequent boiler explosion due to a prolonged low water condition at Hinton, WV. The crew members were killed. The locomotive was not rebuilt, as the class was undergoing retirement by then. The explosion produced was so violent and so powerful that the boiler was thrown from the locomotive’s frame.

== Preservation ==
Surviving Allegheney locomotives
Road Number	Date built number	Location	Coordinates	Notes	Image
1601	December 1941	Henry Ford Museum, Dearborn, Michigan	42°18′14.096″N 83°14′0.46″W	No. 1601 was retired in 1956 and donated to the Henry Ford Museum in Dearborn, Michigan where it has been on display indoors since. No. 1646 was originally earmarked for this purpose, but was replaced by the 1601 owing to 1646 still being on the reserve roster around the time of the donation.	
1604	December 1941	National Museum of Railroad History & Innovation, Baltimore, Maryland	39°17′3.796″N 76°37′59.617″W	No. 1604 was initially sent to C&O's scrap lines behind their diesel shops at Russell, Kentucky upon retirement. It was then donated to the Virginia Museum of Transportation in Roanoke in 1969 where it was displayed next to Norfolk and Western 1218. On November 4, 1985, it was partially damaged by a flood, which washed away the ground under it and nearly turned the locomotive over. In 1987, parent company Norfolk Southern performed a cosmetic overhaul on the locomotive at their Roanoke Shops before sending it to Baltimore to be displayed as the centerpiece of the then Mount Clare Junction shopping center which was adjacent to the B&O Railroad Museum. In 1989, the shopping center donated it to the museum, where it presently resides. The cab has been restored by museum volunteers.	

== See also ==
- Chesapeake and Ohio class T-1
- Chesapeake and Ohio class K-4
