= 2-6-6-6 =

Articulated locomotive wheel arrangement

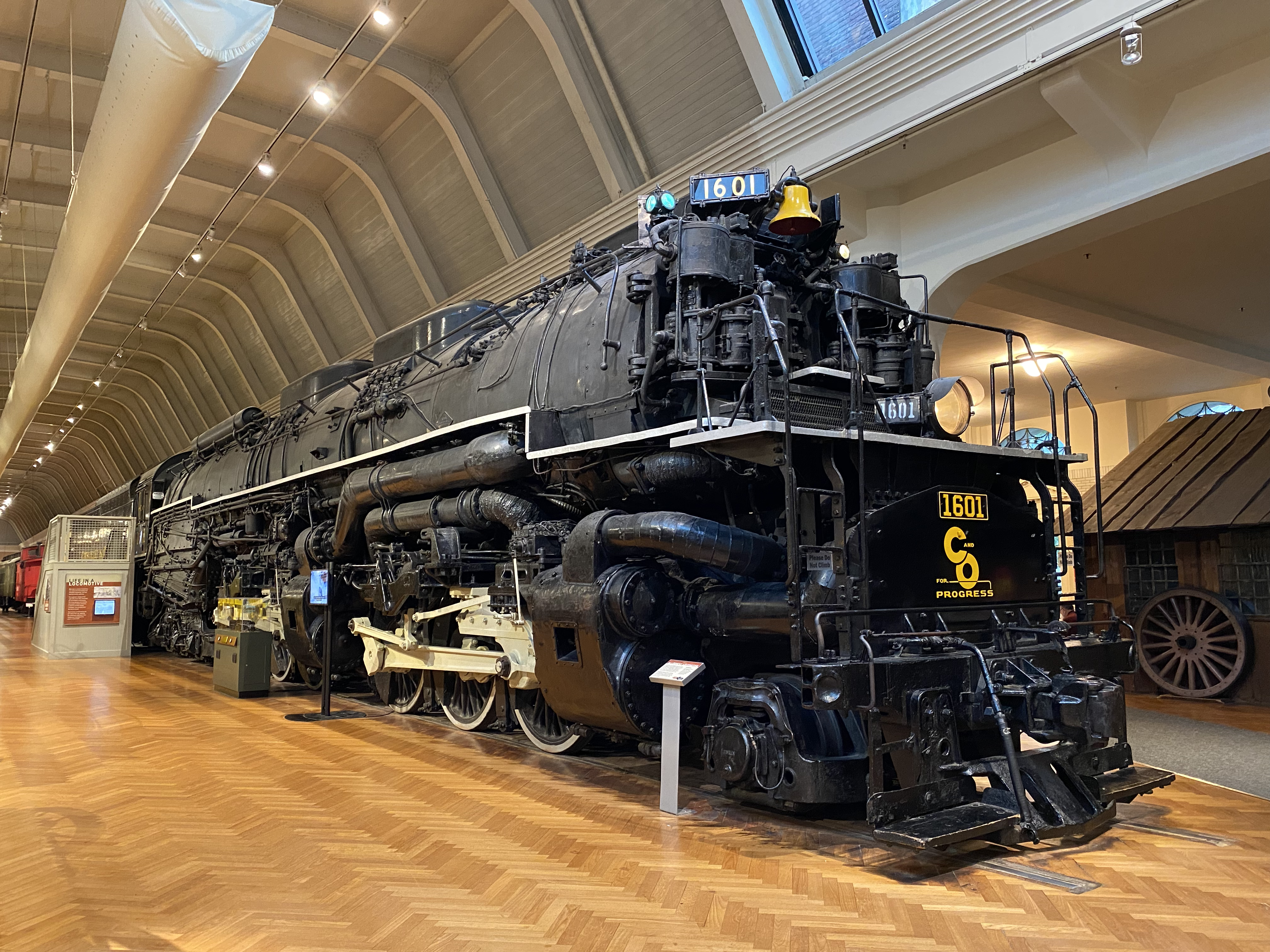
C&O 1601 "Allegheny Class", on display at The Henry Ford Museum in Dearborn, Michigan

The 2-6-6-6 (in Whyte notation) is an articulated locomotive type with two leading wheels, two sets of six driving wheels and six trailing wheels. Only two classes of the 2-6-6-6 type were built. One was the "Allegheny" class, built by the Lima Locomotive Works. The name comes from the locomotive's first service with the Chesapeake and Ohio Railway beginning in 1941, where it was used to haul loaded coal trains over the Allegheny Mountains. The other was the "Blue Ridge" class for the Virginian Railway. These were some of the most powerful reciprocating steam locomotives ever built, at 7,500 horsepower (5,600 kW) (which was exceeded by only the Pennsylvania Railroad class Q2 in indicated horsepower), and one of the heaviest at 386 tons for the locomotive itself plus 215 tons for the loaded tender.

Other equivalent classifications are:
UIC classification: 1CC3 (also known as German classification and Italian classification)
French classification: 130+033
Turkish classification: 34+36
Swiss classification: 3/4+3/6

The UIC classification is refined to (1'C)C3' for simple articulated locomotives.

== History ==
External videos
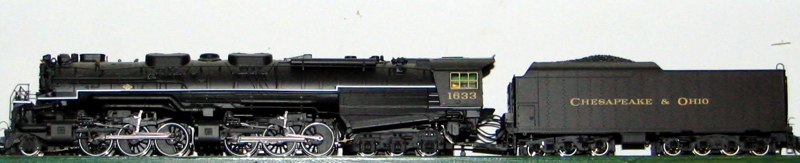
- Allegheny - Most Powerful Steam Locomotive, 1:54, Wanda Kaluza on YouTube

Two classes of 2-6-6-6 locomotives were built: the sixty H-8 "Allegheny" class locomotives for the Chesapeake and Ohio Railway (C&O) between 1941 and 1948, and the eight AG "Blue Ridge" class locomotives for the Virginian Railway in 1945. (The locomotives were Series AG on the Virginian. This was an abbreviation for "Articulated, Series G", not, as is sometimes thought, for "Allegheny".) All were built by the Lima Locomotive Works. The "Allegheny" name refers to the C&O locomotives' job of hauling coal trains over the Allegheny Mountains. C&O 1600 class power output is 7,500 horsepower(5592kW).

Although it was apparent to many knowledgeable people in the railroad industry that reciprocating piston driven steam locomotives might soon be replaced by diesel power, Lima and C&O set out to build the ultimate in high power steam locomotives and they succeeded. No diesel engine ever surpassed the output of these giants, which were among the heaviest steam locomotives ever constructed. The three-axle trailing truck supporting the firebox was unusual, carrying over 190,000 pounds (86,000 kg), allowing the huge firebox needed for the high power. As it turned out, steam locomotives continued in service for almost another 20 years.

Gene Huddleston's book, C&O Power, reports tests of the C&O with a dynamometer car indicating momentary readings of 7,498 hp (5.6 MW) with readings between 6,700 to 6,900 hp (5.0 to 5.1 MW) at about 45 mph (72 km/h). The state of calibration of the dynamometer car is not known. The calculated starting tractive effort was only 110,200 lbf (490.2 kN), but no one has published a higher dynamometer horsepower for any steam locomotive.

The locomotive was built to power coal trains on the 0.57% eastward climb from White Sulphur Springs, West Virginia, to Alleghany, Virginia. With one at the front and another at the back, 11,500-ton coal trains left Hinton, West Virginia, and were at full throttle from White Sulphur Springs to the top of the grade at Alleghany. C&O's 2-6-6-6s also handled coal trains from West Virginia to Columbus, Ohio. Huddleston says that 23 locomotives were equipped with steam piping for heating passenger trains.

While delivering the first group of locomotives in 1941, Lima miscalculated and misrepresented the H-8s' weight. Maintenance crews recalculated the weight, and discovered that the H-8s weighed 771,300 pounds (349,900 kg), which was thousands of pounds heavier than Lima first claimed. The train crews that worked with the H-8s, who were getting paid based on the locomotive's weight on the driving wheels at the time, started seeing this misrepresentation as an attack on their livelihood. The C&O was forced to pay their crews thousands of dollars to make up for lost payment, and they subsequently sued Lima for over $3 million in 1944.

Multiple unit operation in the diesel era removed the need to pack the highest horsepower in a single unit. The H-8's 80,000+ pound axle load demanded heavy rail and track structure.

One H-8, the 1642, suffered a crown sheet failure and subsequent boiler explosion at Hinton, West Virginia, in June 1953. The force of the explosion rocketed the boiler off the running gear towards the rear, killing all three crew. While these locomotives had two sources of water for the boiler, a steam turbine pump-fed Worthington hot pump and one injector, it is not known whether any were defective at the time of dispatch. According to the family of the locomotive's engineer, Wilbur H. Anderson, of Hinton, previous crews had complained of a faulty water level gauge. Anderson's widow, Georgia Anderson, was given $10,000 in compensation by the C&O.

== Preservation ==
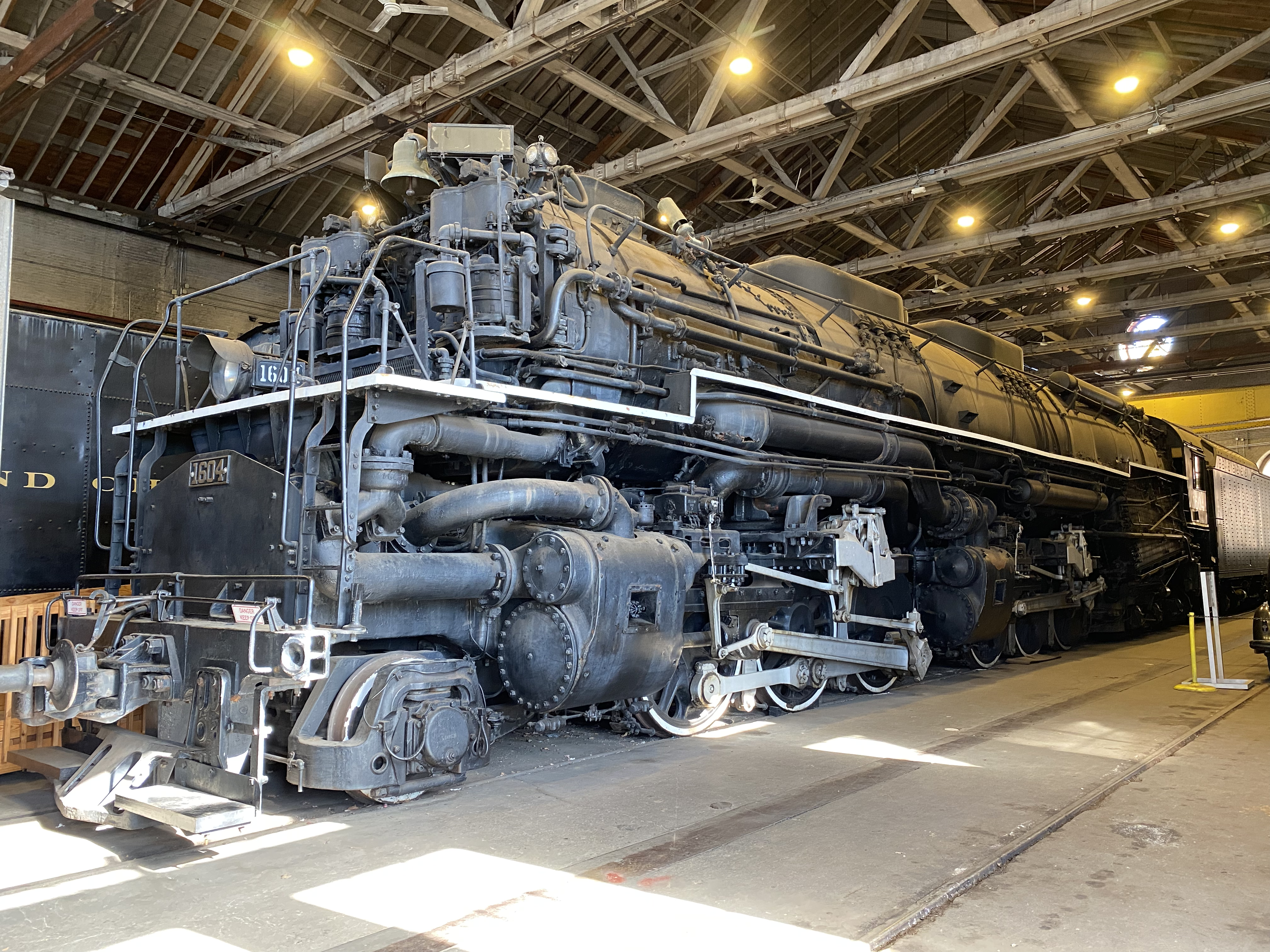
C&O 1604, National Museum of Railroad History & Innovation, Baltimore, MD

There are only two surviving Allegheny locomotives. Upon retirement in 1956, 1601 was donated to The Henry Ford museum in Dearborn, Michigan, where it has been on display indoors since. 1604 was initially sent to C&O's scrap lines behind their diesel shops at Russell, Kentucky. It was then donated to the Virginia Museum of Transportation in Roanoke c. 1969 where it was displayed next to N&W 1218. On November 4, 1985, it was partially damaged by a flood, which washed away the ground under it and nearly turned the locomotive over. In 1987, parent company Norfolk Southern did a cosmetic overhaul on it at their Roanoke Shops before it was sent to Baltimore to be displayed as the centerpiece of the then Mount Clare Junction shopping center which was adjacent to the B&O Railroad Museum. In 1989, the shopping center donated it to the museum, where it presently resides.
