= Chesapeake and Ohio class K-4 =

Class of 90 American 2-8-4 locomotives

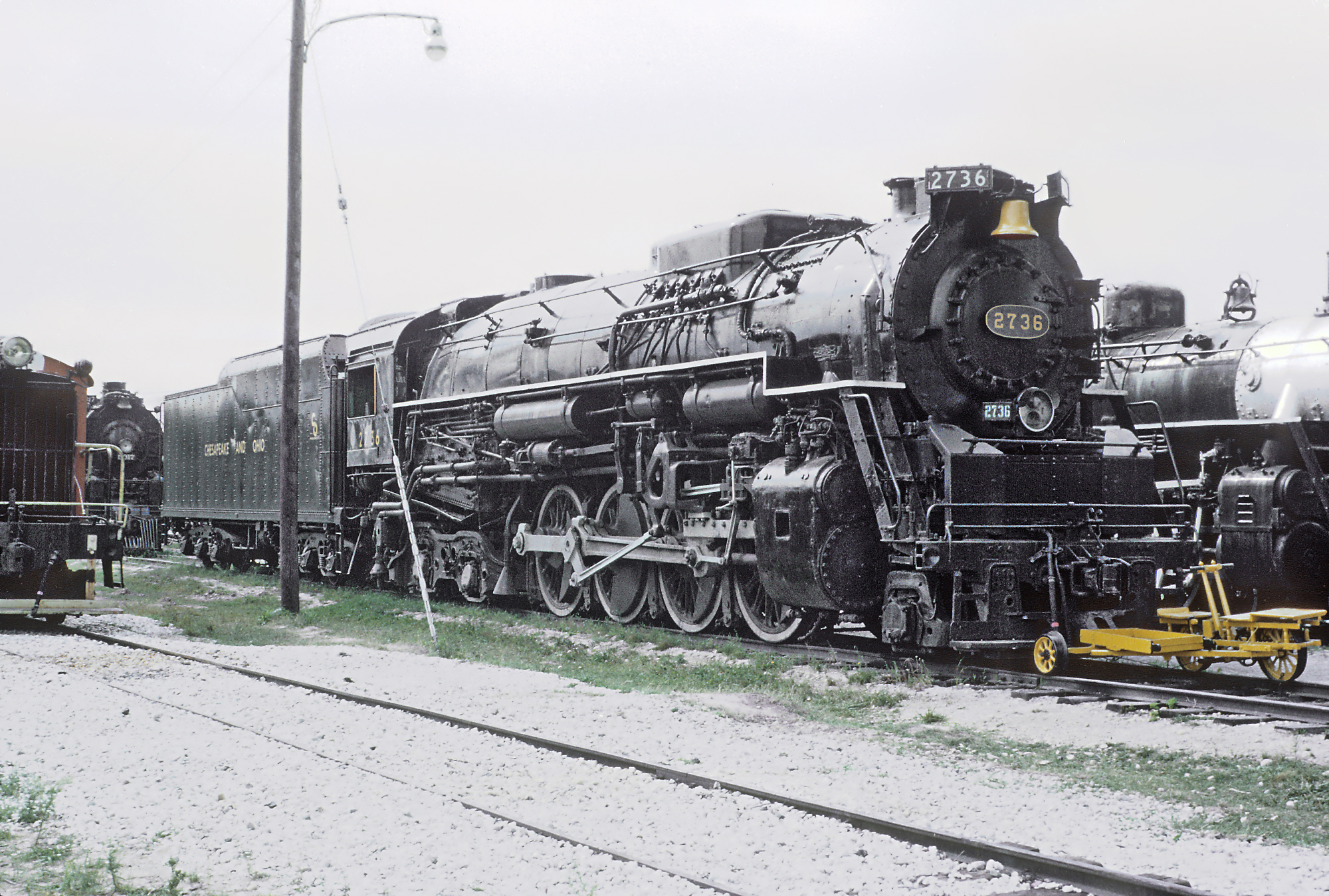
- C&O K-4 No. 2736 at the National Railroad Museum in Green Bay, Wisconsin, September 1963
Type and origin
- Power type: Steam
- Designer: Advisory Mechanical Committee
- Builder: American Locomotive Company (70); Lima Locomotive Works (20)
- Build date: 1943–1947
- Total produced: 90
Specifications
- Configuration
  - Whyte: 2-8-4
  - UIC: 1′D2 h2
- Gauge: 4 ft 8 1/2 in (1,435 mm)
- Leading dia.: 33 in (83.820 cm)
- Driver dia.: 69 in (1.753 m)
- Trailing dia.: 36 in (91.440 cm) (Lead); 43 in (109.220 cm) (Trail)
- Tender wheels: 36 in (91.440 cm)
- Minimum curve: 288 ft (88 m) radius / 20°
- Wheelbase: 93 ft 2 in (28.40 m)
- Length: 105 ft 1 7/8 in (32.05 m)
- Width: 10 ft 10 in (3.30 m)
- Height: 15 ft 7 1/2 in (4.76 m)
- Axle load: 73,000 lb (37 short tons) to 73,600 lb (36.8 short tons)
- Adhesive weight: 292,000 lb (146 short tons) to 293,100 lb (146.6 short tons)
- Loco weight: 460,000 lb (230 short tons) to 469,680 lb (234.84 short tons)
- Tender weight: 388,030 lb (194.02 short tons) to 394,100 lb (197.1 short tons)
- Total weight: 850,000 lb (420 short tons) to 863,780 lb (431.89 short tons)
- Tender type: 21-RG
- Fuel type: Coal
- Fuel capacity: 30 short tons (27 t)
- Water cap.: 21,000 US gal (79,000 L; 17,000 imp gal)
- Firebox
  - Grate area: 90 sq ft (8.4 m^{2})
- Boiler
  - Model: Fire Tube
  - Diameter: 98 in (2,489 mm)
  - Tube plates: 19 ft (6 m)
- Boiler pressure: 245 lbf (1.09 kN)
- Feedwater heater: Worthington 5 1/2 SA; 10,200 US gallon / hr capacity
- Heating surface
  - Firebox: 465 sq ft (43.2 m^{2})
  - Tubes and flues: 4,308 sq ft (400.2 m^{2})
  - Total surface: 4,773 sq ft (443.4 m^{2})
- Superheater
  - Type: Type E
  - Heating area: 1,932 sq ft (179.5 m^{2})
- Cylinders: Two, outside
- Cylinder size: 26 in × 34 in (660 mm × 864 mm)
- Valve gear: Baker
- Valve type: Piston valves
- Valve travel: 8 in (203 mm)
- Valve lap: 1 11/16 in (43 mm)
- Valve lead: 3/16 in (5 mm)
- Train heating: Steam heat
- Loco brake: Pneumatic, Schedule 8-ET
- Train brakes: Pneumatic
Performance figures
- Maximum speed: 80 mph (129 km/h)
- Tractive effort: 69,350 lbf (308.48 kN) (Engine); 14,000 lbf (62.28 kN) (Booster); 83,350 lbf (370.76 kN) (Total)
- Factor of adh.: 4.21-4.23 (Engine); 4.6 (Booster)
Career
- Operators: Chesapeake and Ohio Railway
- Numbers: 2700–2789
- Nicknames: Kanawha; Big Mike
- Retired: 1952–1957
- Preserved: Twelve (Nos. 2700, 2705, 2707, 2716, 2727, 2732, 2736, 2755, 2756, 2760, 2776, 2789) preserved; remainder scrapped
- Restored: Ongoing with No. 2716
- Disposition: No. 2716 undergoing restoration, eleven on display, remainder scrapped
- Ten preserved built by ALCO and two preserved built by Lima

The Chesapeake and Ohio Railway's K-4 class were a group of ninety 2-8-4 steam locomotives purchased during and shortly after World War II. Unlike many other railroads in the United States, the C&O chose to nickname this class "Kanawha", after the river in West Virginia, rather than "Berkshire", after the region in New England.

As of 2024, twelve examples are preserved, with their display locations including the National Railroad Museum, the Science Museum of Virginia, Chief Logan State Park, Dennison Railroad Depot Museum, and the National Museum of Railroad History & Innovation.

== Details ==
In the early 1940s, as the United States entered World War II, the Chesapeake and Ohio Railway (C&O) was looking to roster large locomotives to aid their aging 2-8-2 "Mikados" in general freight service. The Advisory Mechanical Committee (AMC) formulated a 2-8-4 design, named the K-4 class. The K-4s were reproduced from the AMC's previous designs for the Nickel Plate Road's (NKP) 700 series 2-8-4s and the Pere Marquette Railway's (PM) 1200 series 2-8-4s, but the K-4s were equipped with boosters to increase their tractive effort, and their steam domes were positioned behind their sandboxes. The steam domes were positioned in front of the sandboxes for the NKP and PM 2-8-4s, since they allowed for efficient steam passages while traveling on level territories, but the design feature was prone to water-overflowing at the C&O's downhill grades in the Allegheny and Blue Ridge Mountains.

Ninety K-4s, Nos. 2700-2789, were built between 1943 and 1947 by the American Locomotive Company and the Lima Locomotive Works. The K-4s were mostly assigned to heavy and high speed freight services throughout the north-eastern regions of the United States and part of Ontario, Canada by the Pere Marquette. The early K-4s were also used to haul passenger trains during World War II. The K-4s were considered to be one of the few recognizable 2-8-4 "Berkshire" classes in North America, since they were designed with their headlights below their smokeboxes and oval-shaped number plates on their smokebox doors. They were successful locomotives and were popular with crews, so popular with them that they referred to the locomotives as "Big Mikes".

== Preserved Locomotives ==
Twelve Kanawhas have been preserved, with No. 2716 being restored to operation.

- 2700 (On Display) Dennison Railroad Depot Museum - Dennison, Ohio. The first Kanawha built, cosmetically restored in 2017.
- 2705 (On Display) National Museum of Railroad History & Innovation - Baltimore, Maryland.
- 2707 (On Display) Illinois Railway Museum - Union, Illinois.
- 2716 (Undergoing restoration to operating condition) owned by the Kentucky Railway Museum, currently on lease to the Kentucky Steam Heritage Center - Ravenna, Kentucky.
- 2727 (On Display) National Museum of Transportation - St. Louis, Missouri.
- 2732 (On Display) Science Museum of Virginia - Richmond, Virginia.
- 2736 (On Display) National Railroad Museum - Green Bay, Wisconsin.
- 2755 (On Display) Chief Logan State Park - Logan, West Virginia.
- 2756 (On Display) Huntington Park - Newport News, Virginia.
- 2760 (On Display) Riverside Park - Lynchburg, Virginia.
- 2776 (On Display) Eyman Park Dr - Washington Court House, Ohio.
- 2789 (On Display) Hoosier Valley Railroad Museum - North Judson, Indiana. The last Kanawha built.

One Kanawha (No. 2701) was on display in Buffalo, New York after retirement, but was vandalized beyond repair and was eventually scrapped a few months after being on display.

== See also ==
- Chesapeake and Ohio class T-1
- Chesapeake and Ohio class H-8
