= Chesapeake and Ohio class T-1 =

American steam locomotive

C&O T-1 class
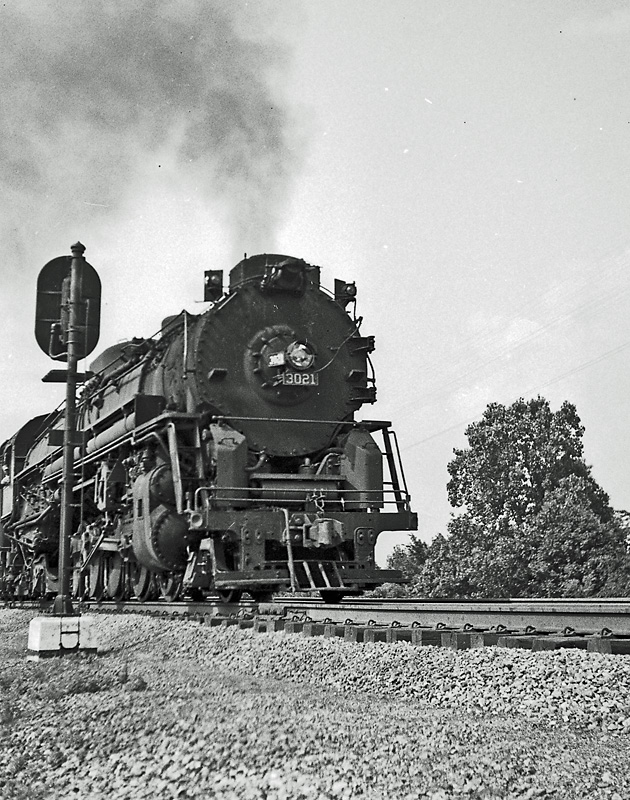
- C&O T-1 locomotive No. 3021 in May 1941
Type and origin
- Power type: Steam
- Designer: Advisory Mechanical Committee
- Builder: Lima Locomotive Works
- Order number: 1122
- Serial number: 7516–7555
- Build date: 1930
- Total produced: 40
Specifications
- Configuration
  - Whyte: 2-10-4
  - UIC: 1′E2′ h2
- Gauge: 4 ft 8 1/2 in (1,435 mm) standard gauge
- Leading dia.: 33 in (838 mm)
- Driver dia.: 69 in (1,753 mm)
- Trailing dia.: 36 in (914 mm); 43 in (1,092 mm) (trail axle)
- Tender wheels: 36 in (914 mm)
- Minimum curve: 338 ft (103 m) radius / 17°
- Wheelbase: 99 ft 5 3/4 in (30.32 m) (Total)
- Length: 111 ft 5 1/8 in (33.96 m)
- Width: 11 ft 3 in (3.43 m)
- Height: 16 ft 7 in (5.05 m)
- Frame type: Built-up
- Axle load: 75,000 lb (38 short tons)
- Adhesive weight: 373,000 lb (186.5 tons)
- Loco weight: 566,000 lb (283 tons)
- Tender weight: 415,000 lb (207.5 tons)
- Total weight: 981,000 lb (490.5 tons)
- Tender type: 23-RA
- Fuel type: Coal
- Fuel capacity: 30 tons (60,000 lb)
- Water cap.: 23,500 US gallons
- Sandbox cap.: 72 ft^{3} (2.0 m^{3})
- Firebox
  - Grate area: 121 sq ft (11.2 m^{2})
- Boiler
  - Model: Fire Tube
  - Diameter: 108 in (2,743 mm)
  - Tube plates: 21 ft (6 m)
- Boiler pressure: 265 psi (1933-); 260 psi (As built)
- Safety valve: Pop, 3 1/2 in (89 mm); 4 per locomotive
- Feedwater heater: Worthington 6-S; 12,000 US gal / hr capacity
- Heating surface
  - Firebox: 477 sq ft (44 m^{2})
  - Arch tubes: 168.5 sq ft (16 m^{2})
  - Tubes and flues: 5,978 sq ft (555 m^{2})
  - Total surface: 6,623.5 sq ft (615 m^{2})
- Superheater
  - Type: Type E
  - Heating area: 3,030 sq ft (281 m^{2})
- Cylinders: Two, outside
- Cylinder size: 29 in × 34 in (737 mm × 864 mm)
- Valve gear: Baker-long travel
- Valve type: Piston
- Valve travel: 9 in (229 mm)
- Valve lap: 1 15/16 in (49 mm)
- Valve lead: 3/16 in (5 mm)
- Loco brake: Pneumatic, Schedule 6-ET
- Train brakes: Pneumatic
Performance figures
- Maximum speed: 60 mph (97 km/h)
- Power output: 5,200 hp (3,900 kW) @ 41 mph (66 km/h) (drawbar)
- Tractive effort: 93,350 lbf (Engine); 15,275 lbf (Booster); 108,625 lbf (Total)
- Factor of adh.: 4.00 (Engine); 4.32 (Booster)
Career
- Operators: Chesapeake and Ohio
- Class: T-1
- Numbers: 3000–3039
- Retired: 1952–1953
- Disposition: All scrapped

The Chesapeake and Ohio T-1 was a class of forty 2-10-4 steam locomotives built by the Lima Locomotive Works in 1930 and operated until the early 1950s.

== History and design ==
In 1925, the Lima Locomotive Works of Lima, Ohio, built their prototype A-1 class 2-8-4 locomotive, and they demonstrated it on various railroads, proclaiming it as a "super power" locomotive with its high horsepower output. The Chesapeake and Ohio Railway (C&O), which was in search of larger locomotives, allowed for the A-1 to be tested in their Allegheny Subdivision, and while impressed with the A-1’s performance, the C&O opted to wait for reviews from other railroads before placing their own orders.

By 1929, other railroads had rostered 2-8-4 "Berkshires", including the Erie Railroad, and then the C&O decided to roster their own super power designs. By that time, the C&O was operating under control of the Van Sweringen brothers, who formed the Advisory Mechanical Committee (AMC) to standardize all of their railroad subsidiaries. In 1930, the C&O ordered the first of forty 2-10-4 "Texas"-types from Lima, which they classified as the T-1 class, and they shared identical design features with the Erie’s 2-8-4s.

The T-1s were equipped with a trailing truck booster that exerted 15,275 pounds-force (67.95 kN) of tractive effort. The T-1s could haul trains of the same length as an H-7 class 2-8-8-2 at a faster speed. The locomotives mainly operated between Russell, Kentucky and Toledo, Ohio, with a few being assigned in eastern Virginia. They were rated at 13,500-short-ton (12,200 t; 12,100-long-ton) loaded coal hoppers. They also sported the most heating surface of any two-cylinder steam locomotive, with a combined heating surface of 9,654 square feet (896.9 m^{2}).

Despite their overall success, their long-wheelbase made it difficult to maintain a proper counterbalancing scheme as the drivers wore unevenly in service. Later in their careers, as their built up frames began to work loose, the T-1s rode roughly and pounded the track to the point that a special gang stood by at the bottom of one long grade to repair the damage.

In 1942, the Pennsylvania Railroad based 125 of their J1 class 2-10-4s off of the T-1s with slight modifications.

== Accident ==
On May 12, 1948, no. 3020 suffered a boiler explosion due to a low water level near Chillicothe, Ohio. The low water level led to the overheating and weakening of the firebox. When cooler water was added, it flashed into a massive amount of steam, causing a sudden and catastrophic pressure surge that the weakened boiler couldn't withstand, resulting in a deadly explosion that killed the crew. The engineer (W.R. Terry), fireman (T.R. Lauter), and front brakeman (W.C. Bush) were killed.

== Disposition ==
The C&O began retiring the T-1 locomotives in 1952 in favor of diesel locomotives, and by 1953, all had been retired. None were preserved.

== See also ==
- Chesapeake and Ohio class H-8
- Chesapeake and Ohio class K-4
