= Chessie (mascot) =

Mascot of the Chesapeake and Ohio Railway

Guido Grünewald's original etching of a sleeping kitten, from which Chessie originated.

Chessie on a 1940s timetable.

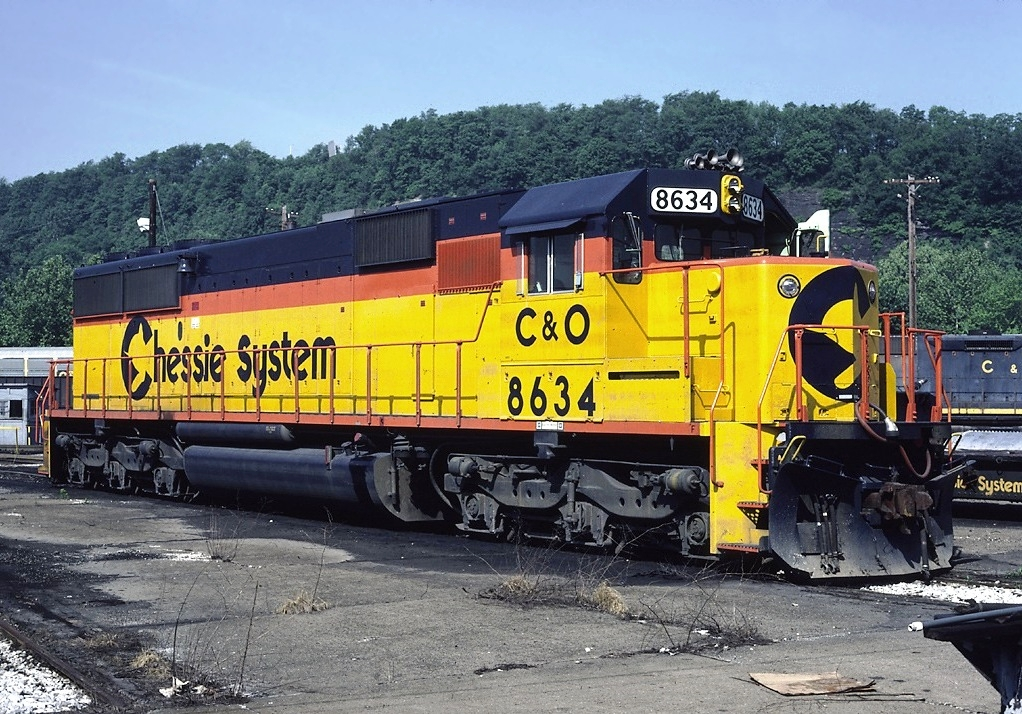
A Chessie System locomotive, bearing the simplified Chessie logo.

Chessie was a popular cat character used as a symbol of the Chesapeake and Ohio Railway (C&O). Derived from an etching by Viennese artist Guido Grünewald, the image first appeared in a black and white advertisement in the September 1933 issue of Fortune magazine with the slogan "Sleep Like a Kitten." The advertisement makes no mention of the cat's name.

When the ad generated a positive response, the railroad developed an advertising campaign around the image and chose the name Chessie as a derivation of the railroad's name. The promotion proved widely popular and, in addition to national print advertising, grew to include calendars, clothing, and even two children's books about the character. Chessie's mate was Peake, who was introduced in the June 1937 issue of Life magazine and was the father of her two kittens, "Nip" and "Tuck". During World War II, the Chessie character was used to promote War Bonds and support for the war effort, depicted as working on the home front to support Peake, who was off to war. The Chessie image continued to appear in advertising until 1971 when passenger train travel was consolidated under Amtrak.

A post war 1945 newspaper print depicting the reunited Chessie, Peek, Nip, and Tuck.

When in 1972 the C&O merged with the Baltimore and Ohio Railroad and Western Maryland Railway, the newly formed holding company was named the Chessie System after the popular image. C&O itself had been popularly called "Chessie System" since the 1930s. Chessie System also adopted the "Ches-C" logo, which incorporated the silhouette of the kitten into the "C" of the railroad's name. The Chessie System merged with other railroads to become the CSX Corporation in 1986. Though the Chessie logo is no longer found in advertising and was phased out of usage on trains, Chessie is still the mascot of the CSX Corporation, and there are many examples of rolling stock that still feature the kitten logo, having yet to be repainted.

== Books ==
- Dixon, Thomas W. Jr. (1988). Chessie the Railroad Kitten. TLC Publishing. ISBN 978-0-9622003-1-1.
