= EMD MP15T =

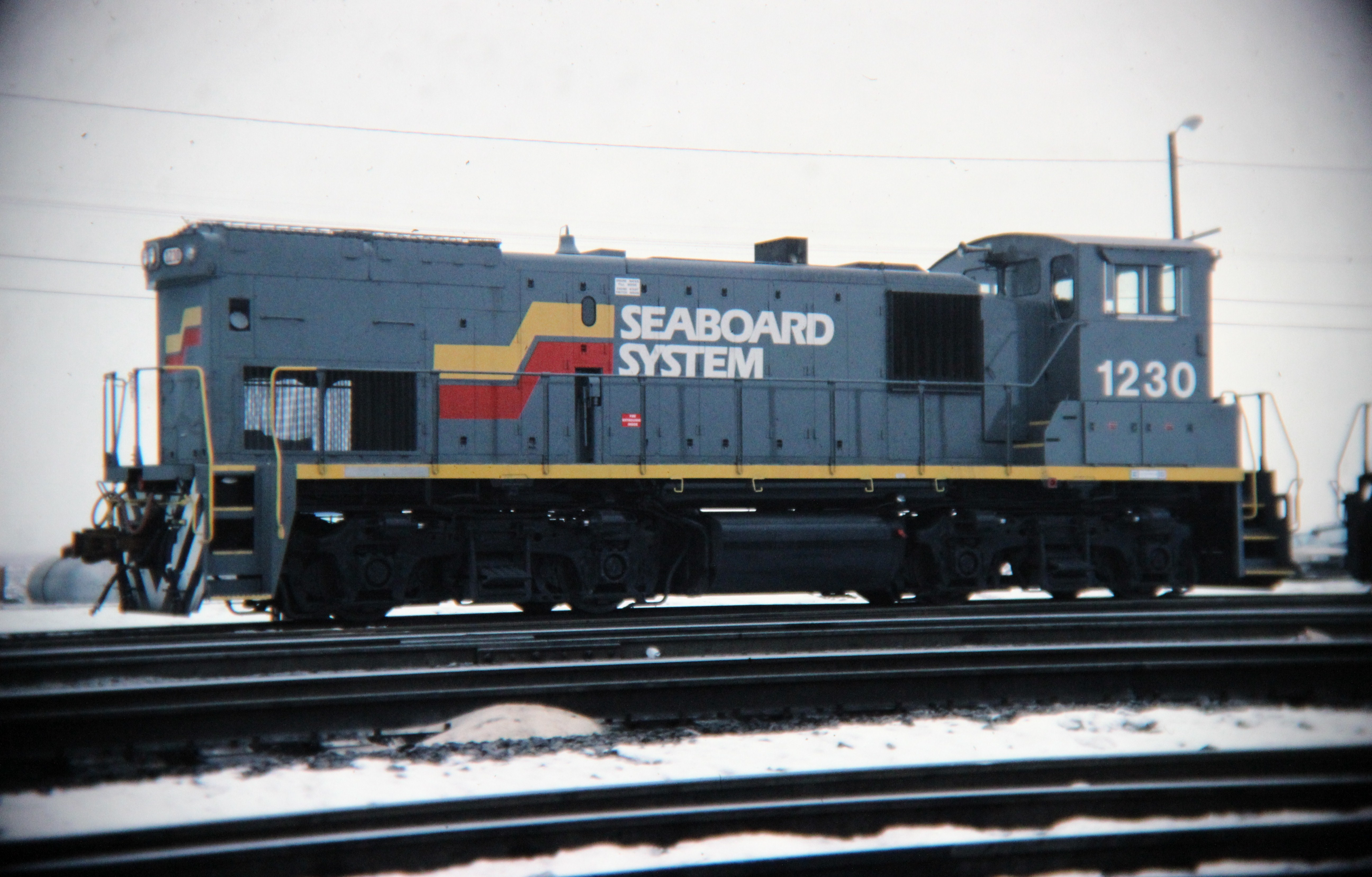
- Seaboard System MP15T
Type and origin
- Power type: Diesel
- Builder: General Motors Electro-Motive Division
- Model: MP15T
- Build date: October 1984 – November 1987
- Total produced: 43
Specifications
- Configuration
  - AAR: B-B
- Gauge: 4 ft 8 1/2 in (1,435 mm) standard gauge
- Fuel type: Diesel
- Prime mover: EMD 8-645E3
- Engine type: V8
- Cylinders: 8
- Transmission: Electric
- Train heating: None
- Loco brake: Air
- Train brakes: Air
Career
- Operators: Seaboard System Railroad Dow Chemical Company
- Number in class: 43

The EMD MP15T was a model of diesel-electric switcher locomotives built by General Motors Electro-Motive Division between October 1984 and November 1987. Instead of a mechanically-aspirated 12-cylinder EMD 645 engine, it used a turbocharged 8-cylinder version of the 645 engine. The external appearance of the locomotive remains similar to other MP15 models.

42 of these locomotives were built for the Seaboard System Railroad, 1200–1241 (later merged into CSX Transportation where they kept their numbers) and one unit for Dow Chemical Company, number 957.

In 2010 Progress Rail, a fully owned subsidiary of Caterpillar, purchased MP15T 1220 from CSX making CSX's total count 40.

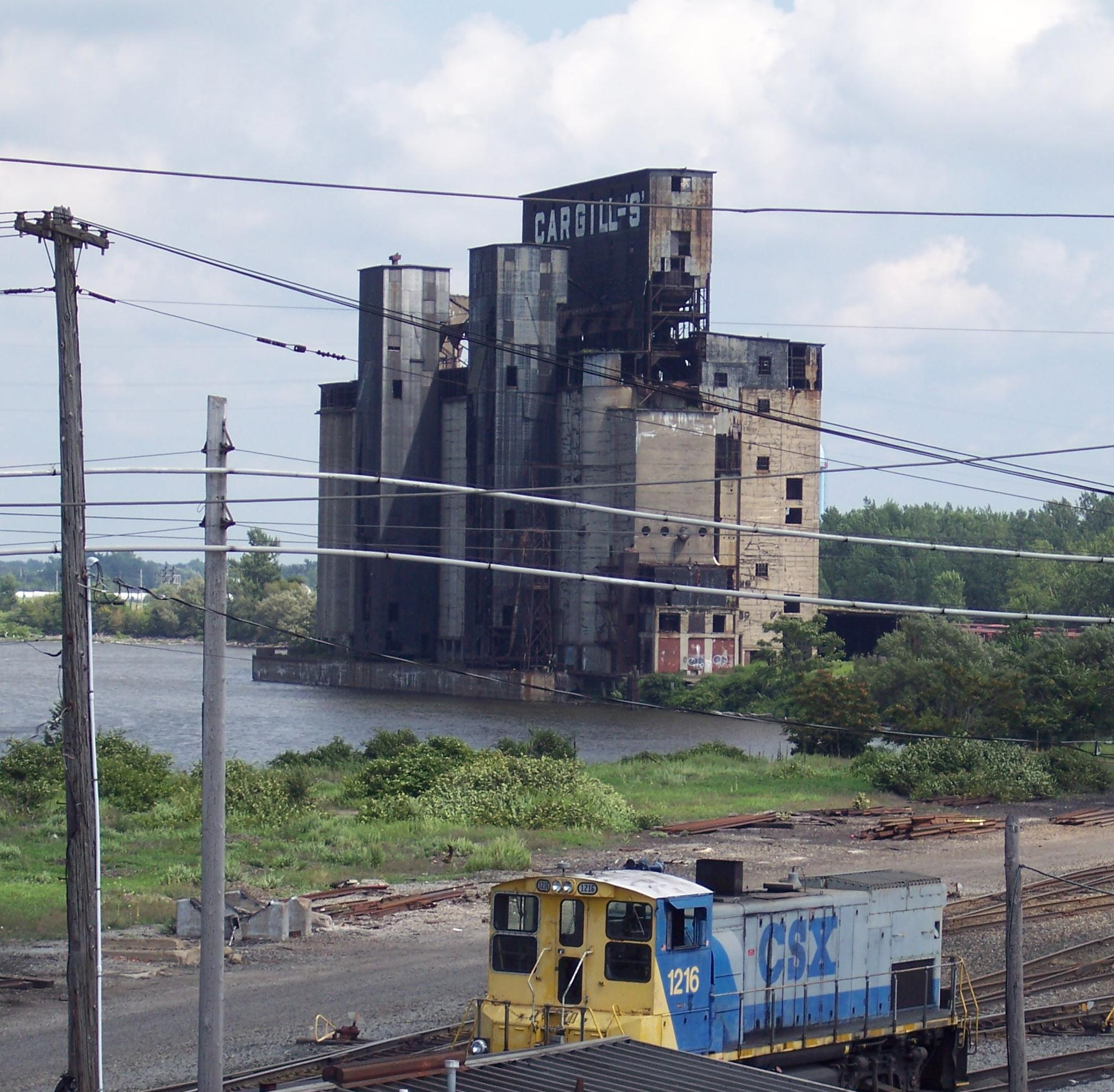
CSX #1216 in Buffalo, New York in 2004.

== Original buyers ==
Railroad	Quantity	Road numbers	Notes
Seaboard System Railroad	42	1200–1241	to CSX same numbers
Dow Chemical Company	1	957	
Total	43		

== See also ==
- List of GM-EMD locomotives
