= Chesapeake and Ohio 2755 =

Preserved American 2-8-4 locomotive (C&O K-4 class)

Chesapeake & Ohio 2755
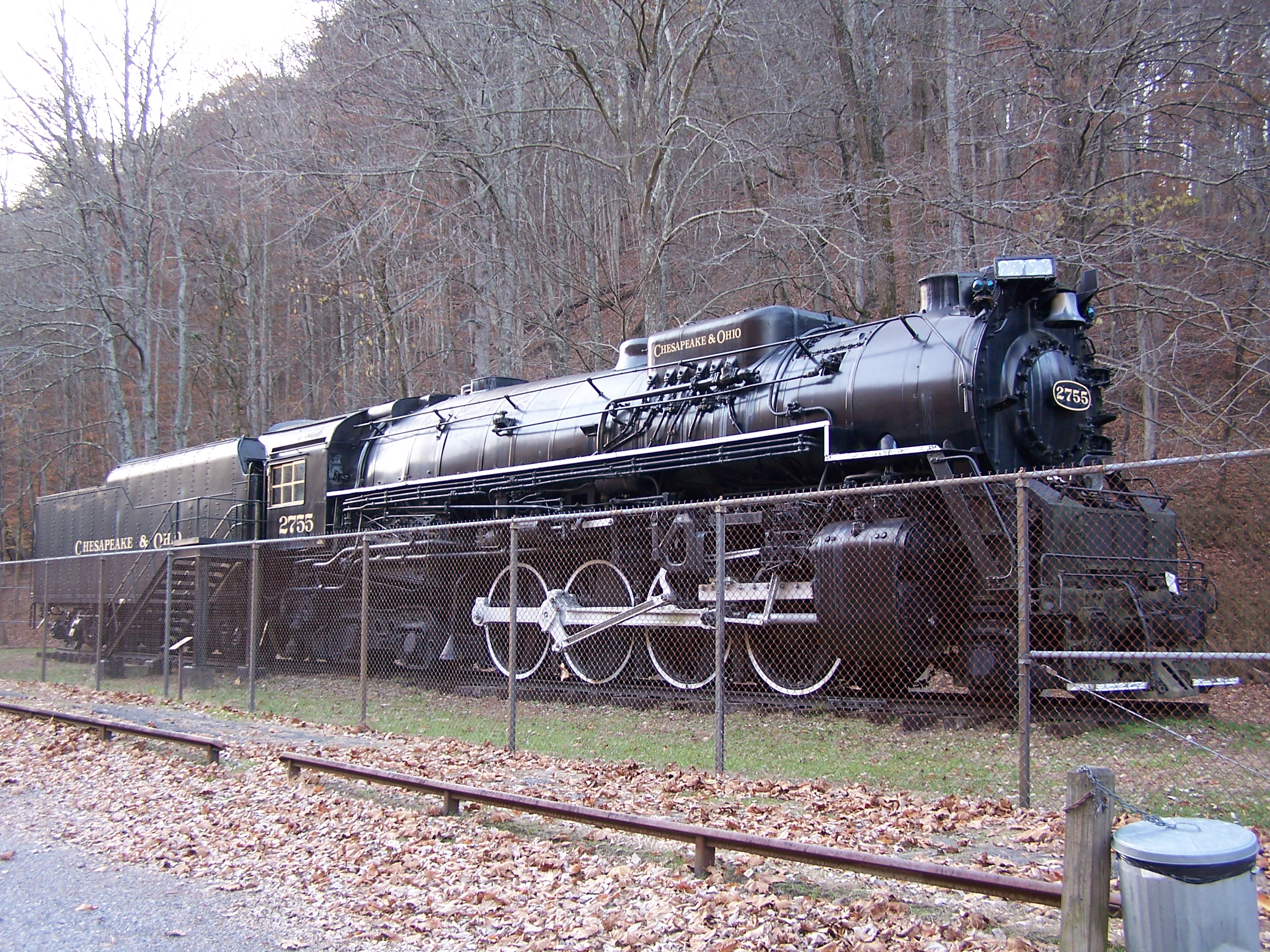
Type and origin
- Power type: Steam
- Builder: Lima Locomotive Works
- Order number: 1198
- Serial number: 9262
- Build date: January 1947
Specifications
- Configuration
  - Whyte: 2-8-4
- Gauge: 4 ft 8 1/2 in (1,435 mm)
- Driver dia.: 69 in (1,753 mm)
- Length: 105.2 ft (32.1 m)
- Adhesive weight: 292,000 lb (132.4 tonnes)
- Loco weight: 460,000 lb (208.7 tonnes)
- Tender weight: 388,000 lb (176.0 tonnes)
- Total weight: 848,000 lb (384.6 tonnes)
- Tender type: 21-RG
- Fuel type: Coal
- Fuel capacity: 30 short tons (27.2 t)
- Water cap.: 21,000 US gal (79,500 L)
- Firebox
  - Grate area: 90 sq ft (8.4 m^{2})
- Boiler pressure: 245 psi (1.69 MPa)
- Feedwater heater: Worthington Type 5½ SSA
- Heating surface: 4,714 sq ft (437.9 m^{2})
- Superheater: Elesco Type E
- Cylinders: Two, outside
- Cylinder size: 26 in × 34 in (660 mm × 864 mm)
- Valve gear: Baker
Performance figures
- Tractive effort: 69,368 lbf (308.56 kN)
- Factor of adh.: 4.23
Career
- Operators: Chesapeake and Ohio Railway
- Class: K-4
- Number in class: 56 of 90
- Numbers: 2755
- Retired: 1956
- Current owner: West Virginia Division of Natural Resources
- Disposition: On static display
- Chesapeake and Ohio 2755 Steam Locomotive
- U.S. National Register of Historic Places
- Location within West Virginia Location within the United States
- Nearest city: Henlawson, West Virginia
- Coordinates: 37°53′34″N 82°0′34″W
- Area: 0.2 acres (0.081 ha)
- Built: 1947
- Architect: Lima Locomotive Works
- Architectural style: K-4 Class Locomotive
- NRHP reference No.: 06000900
- Added to NRHP: September 28, 2006

Chesapeake & Ohio Railway 2755 is a preserved class "K-4" 2-8-4 "Kanawha" "(Berkshire) type steam locomotive built in 1947 by the Lima Locomotive Works for the Chesapeake and Ohio Railway (C&O) It is the 56th of ninety built by ALCO (which built seventy) and Lima (which built the remaining twenty, including 2755) between 1943 and 1947.

A Berkshire type was the first of the Lima Super Power locomotives in 1925 and these followed in that tradition, with all the latest equipment -- Schmidt superheater, Elesco feedwater heater, booster on the trailing truck, roller bearings, and so forth. They carried Baker valve gear, whereas the C&O preferred to the simpler and much more widely used Walschaerts valve gear.

It spent its nine-year working life hauling coal on the various mine branches out of Logan, West Virginia, usually to the Ohio River at Russell, Kentucky. Its last known run was from Handley, West Virginia, to Russell on January 18, 1956.

After refurbishing at the Huntington, West Virginia, shops in the fall of 1960, it was delivered to its present location in Chief Logan State Park in March 1961. It was seriously vandalized in the late 1970s or early 1980s, with the glass broken and gauges stolen or destroyed. It has been repaired and fenced for protection. The Island Creek Model Railroad Club acts as curators.

The locomotive was added to the National Register of Historic Places on September 28, 2006 as Chesapeake and Ohio 2755 Steam Locomotive.
