= Hays T. Watkins Jr. =

American businessman and philanthropist (1926–2022)

- Born: Hays Thomas Watkins; January 26, 1926; Fern Creek, Kentucky, U.S.
- Died: July 29, 2022 (aged 96); Richmond, Virginia, U.S.
- Education: Bowling Green Business University (B.S.); Northwestern University (M.B.A); William and Mary (LL.D)
- Occupation: Businessman
- Known for: Former CEO of CSX Transportation
- Spouse: Betty Watkins
- Children: 1

Hays Thomas Watkins (January 26, 1926 – July 29, 2022) was an American businessman and philanthropist, chairman and CEO of CSX Transportation from 1971 until his retirement in 1991.

== Early life and education ==
Watkins was born on January 26, 1926, on a farm in Henry County, Kentucky. His father was a banker, laid off during the great depression, and a tobacco farmer. From a young age, he was known for his prowess with numbers. He attended high school in New Castle, graduating in 1942 at age 16.

Wanting to attend business school, he matriculated at Bowling Green Business School (now Western Kentucky University), where he studied accounting for 3 years. He was then drafted into the U.S. Army, where he spent a year stationed in Panama, despite studying Japanese in preparation for the planned invasion of Japan. After leaving the army in 1947, he completed his last year of school at Bowling Green. He then attended Northwestern University in Chicago, earning his MBA.

While in Chicago, his fascination with trains grew. He spent his days taking pictures of the passenger trains going in and out of Chicago.

== Career ==
After graduating from Northwestern, he was faced with the choice between railroading and accounting. Deciding that railroading was more exciting, he began working for the C&O Railroad in Cleveland in the finance department.

A year later, he was transferred to Richmond, Virginia, where he worked under John Cusick, Vice President of Finance. Cusick moved Watkins to accounting, and eventually, after creating the department, into internal auditing. While in the internal auditing department, he studied the cost of passenger rail, quantifying the decline in rail passenger demand.

While working under Cusick, he was frequently called on the phone late in the evening and moved to different departments. Despite this, he continued to work for the C&O under Cusick.

He eventually moved into the general auditing department, becoming the Vice President of Finance. While working as an auditor, he explored mergers, including the original feasibility study of a C&O/B&O merger, one that eventually happened in December 1962.

=== CSX ===
He was elected President and CEO of C&O/B&O in 1971, following the retirement of Greg DeVine, sworn in during the April 1971 board meeting. In 1973 he also became the Chairman. As CEO, he transformed the C&O, which by 1975 had become Chessie System, into a multi-modal company, including several more railroad mergers, Texas Gas Transmission, and Sea-Land Service for a brief period. In 1980, he became the CEO of CSX Corporation after a merger with Seaboard Coast Line Railroad, and in 1983 he became the CEO of CSX Watkins is responsible for the naming of CSX, the C standing for Chessie System, S for Seaboard Lines, and the X being a temporary designation for "unknown or more". He retired from CSX in 1991, after a 40 year career in the railroad industry.

=== Corporate leadership and academia ===
Besides his work in the railroad industry, he had also served as a director at various corporations, including Black & Decker, Westinghouse Electric, Signet Banking. He also served as a rector of the Board of Visitors at William & Mary, and as a member of the Board of Trustees for the school of engineering at Virginia Commonwealth University

== Personal life ==
Watkins philanthropic work included several donations to the Fund for William & Mary, W&M Athletics. He and his son Tom have also endowed the Hays T. Watkins Professorship within the Raymond A. Mason School of Business.

Watkins was married to Betty Watkins, a marriage of 72 years when he died. He had one son, H. Thomas (Wendy) Watkins III, and three grandchildren.
