= Seaboard Coast Line Industries =

American railroad holding company

Seaboard Coast Line Industries, Inc., incorporated in Delaware on May 9, 1969, was a railroad holding company that owned the Seaboard Coast Line Railroad, its subsidiary Louisville and Nashville Railroad, and several smaller carriers. Its railroad subsidiaries were collectively known as the Family Lines System. The Seaboard Coast Line Industries headquarters were in Jacksonville, Florida, in the United States. Through 1979, the Family Lines network totaled 16,326 miles (26,274 km) in 13 states.

The company succeeded SCL Industries, Inc., incorporated August 1, 1968, in Virginia and renamed Seaboard Coast Line Industries, Inc. on February 5, 1969.

On November 1, 1980, Seaboard Coast Line Industries merged with Chessie System, Inc. to form CSX Corporation (Chessie-Seaboard Multiplied), and in 1983 the Family Lines units were combined as the Seaboard System Railroad. In 1986, Seaboard System was renamed CSX Transportation, and then merged with sister CSX Corp. subsidiary Chessie System to form a single new railroad, reporting mark CSXT.

== Notable Trains ==
On May 23, 2024, CSX Transportation rolled out a GE ES44AH locomotive, numbered 1967, with the front end painted in regular Blue and Yellow CSX paint then switching to a paint scheme in homage to the Seaboard Coast Line company.
