= Chessie System =

Holding company for several Eastern US Class I railroads

Overview
- Headquarters: Cleveland, Ohio, U.S.
- Reporting mark: B&O; C&O; WM
- Locale: Delaware; Illinois; Indiana; Kentucky; Maryland; Michigan; New Jersey; New York; Ohio; Ontario; Pennsylvania; Virginia; Washington, D.C. West Virginia
- Dates of operation: 1973–1986
- Successor: CSX Transportation

Technical
- Track gauge: 4 ft 8 1/2 in (1,435 mm) standard gauge
- Length: 20,000 mi (32,000 km)

Chessie System, Inc. was a holding company that owned the Chesapeake and Ohio Railway (C&O), the Baltimore and Ohio Railroad (B&O), the Western Maryland Railway (WM), and Baltimore and Ohio Chicago Terminal Railroad (B&OCT). Trains operated under the Chessie name from 1973 to 1987.

Headquartered in Cleveland, Ohio, the Chessie System was the creation of Cyrus S. Eaton and his protégé Hays T. Watkins, then president and chief executive officer of the C&O. A chief source of revenue for the Chessie System was coal mined in West Virginia. Another was the transport of auto parts and finished motor vehicles.

"Chessie" had been a popular nickname for the C&O since the 1930s, cemented with an advertising campaign that featured a sleeping kitten named Chessie. The 1970s holding company developed the "Ches-C" emblem: a kitten outline imposed on a circle, creating a rough letter C. This emblem was emblazoned on the front of all Chessie System locomotives, and also served as the "C" in "Chessie System" on the locomotive's flanks, and on other rolling stock.

== History ==
The beginnings of the Chessie System came from cooperation between the Baltimore and Ohio Railroad (B&O) and the Chesapeake and Ohio Railway (C&O). An announcement from the New York Central (NYC) and Pennsylvania (PRR) railroads in November 1957 that they were considering combining prompted the B&O and C&O to consider a similar move. Ultimately, the financially stronger C&O took control of the B&O in December 1962, though the two railroads kept their separate identities.

The combined C&O/B&O purchased stock in the Western Maryland Railway until it was able to take full control in February 1967, bringing a third railroad into the combined entity, which in 1973 became formally known as the Chessie System after the C&O's historic cat mascot Chessie.

Chessie System was incorporated in Virginia on February 26, 1973, and it acquired the railroads on June 15.

On November 1, 1980, Chessie System merged with Seaboard Coast Line Industries to form CSX Corporation. Initially, the three Chessie System railroads continued to operate separately, even after Seaboard's six Family Lines System railroads were merged into the Seaboard System Railroad on December 29, 1982. That began to change in 1983, when the WM was merged into the B&O. The Chessie image continued to be applied to new and re-painted equipment until July 1, 1986, when CSXT introduced its own paint scheme. In April 1987, the B&O was merged into the C&O. In August 1987, C&O merged into CSX Transportation, a 1986 renaming of the Seaboard System Railroad, and the Chessie System name was retired.

== List of railroad subsidiaries ==
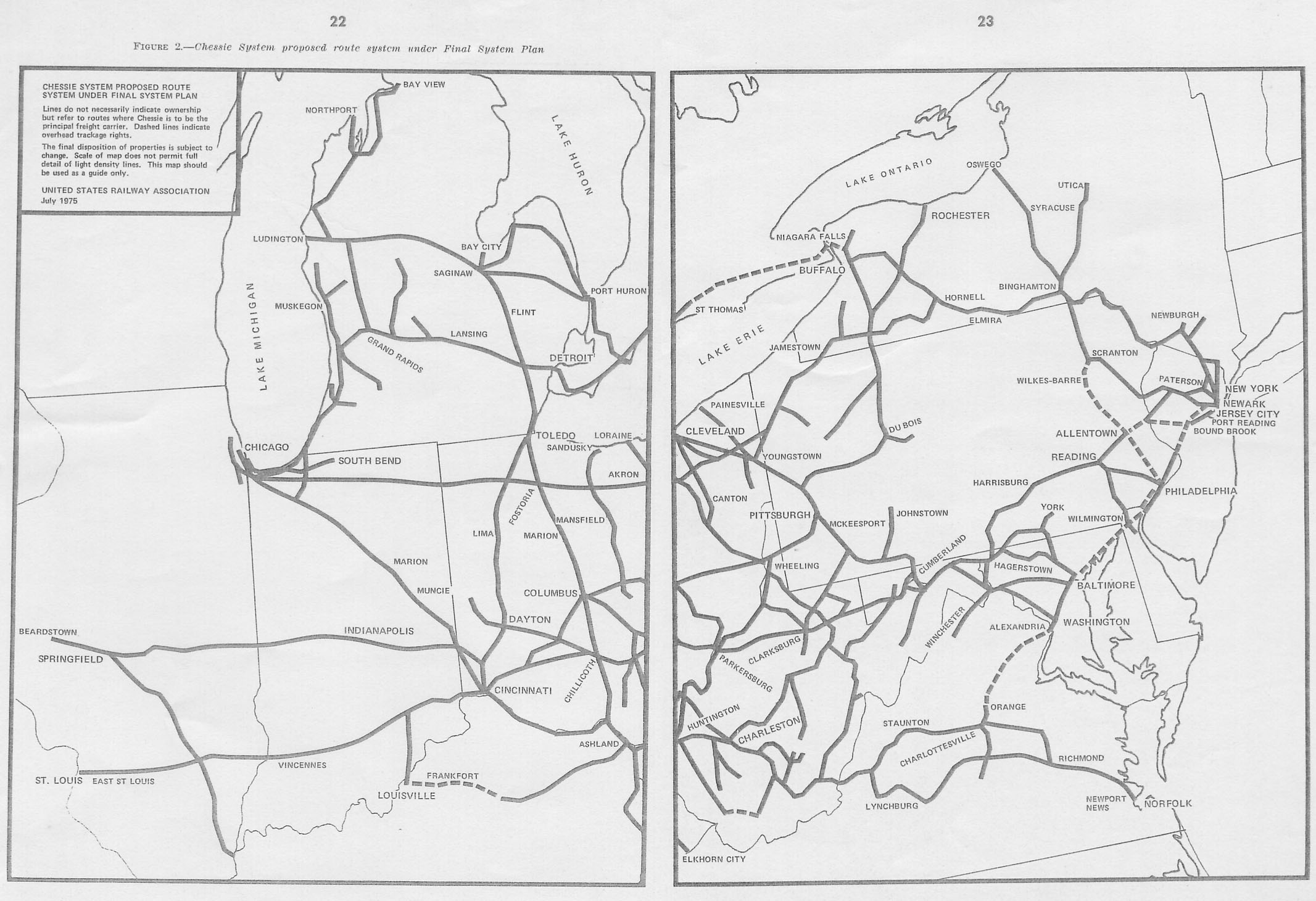
The Chessie System as of 1975.

Its subsidiaries included:

- Baltimore & Ohio Railroad
- Baltimore & Ohio Chicago Terminal Railroad
- Chesapeake & Ohio Railway
- Covington & Cincinnati Elevated Railroad & Transfer & Bridge Company
- Staten Island Railroad
- Toledo Ore RR Company
- Western Maryland Railway

== Notable locomotives ==
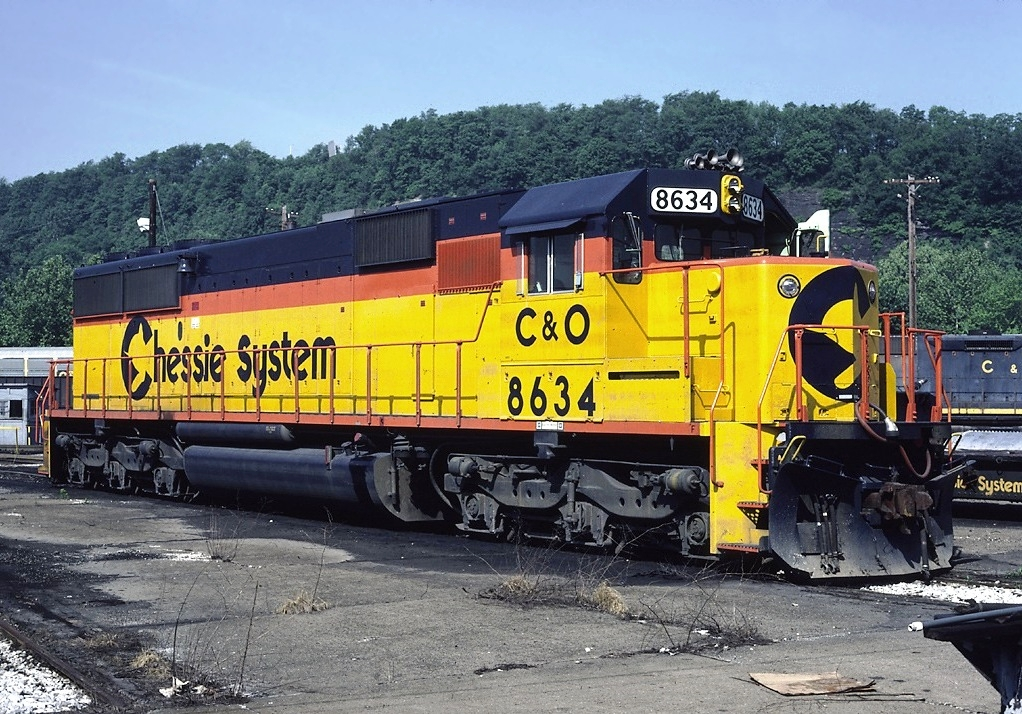
Chessie System SD50 locomotive in Connellsville, Pennsylvania

The Chessie System company itself directly owned no locomotives or other rolling stock. Instead, equipment was placed on the roster of one of the three component railroads and ownership denoted by the reporting marks C&O, B&O, and WM. All three companies shared a common paint scheme of yellow, vermillion, and blue.

Notable Chessie System locomotives include:

- B&O #1977 (EMD GP40-2) was meant to celebrate the B&O's 150th anniversary. For a short time, there were two B&O locomotives numbered 1977; this GP40 was later renumbered B&O 4100 and B&O 4163.
- B&O #GM50 (EMD GP40-2) was painted gold to celebrate GM-EMD's 50th anniversary as a diesel locomotive manufacturer. In 1984, it was repainted and renumbered B&O 4164.
- B&O #3802 (EMD GP38) was named the All American Locomotive by Trains in 1982. It has been restored and is on display at the National Museum of Railroad History & Innovation in Baltimore.
- B&O #4444 (EMD GP40-2) pulled Ronald Reagan's 1984 presidential train through Ohio. It was the third-to-last GP40-2 owned by Chessie; the last was B&O 4447.

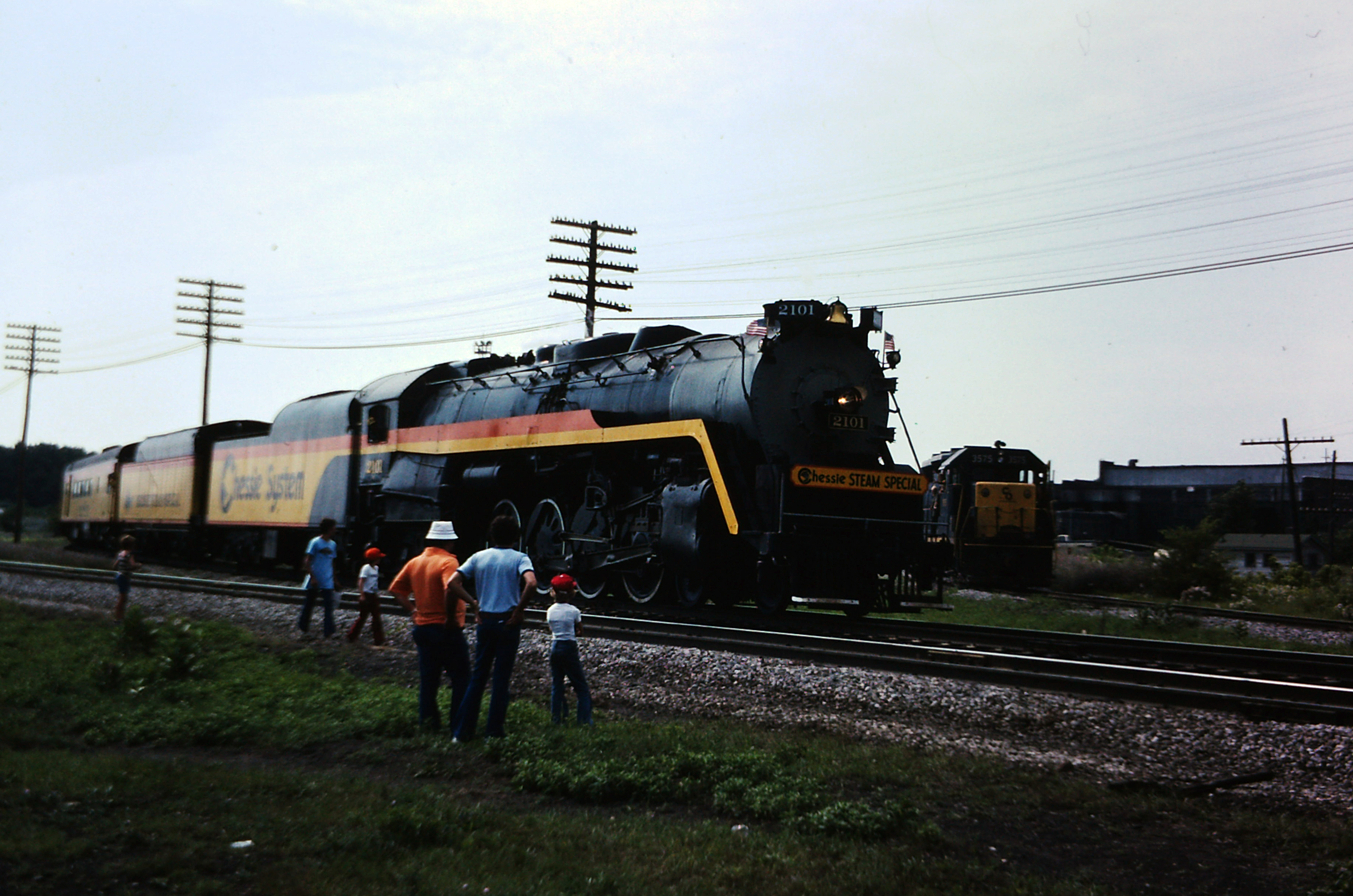
The former Reading 2101 leading the "Chessie Steam Special" into Plymouth, Michigan in 1977.

The former Reading Company #2101 (T-1-class 4-8-4) was one of three locomotives that pulled the American Freedom Train in 1975 and 1976. As part of B&O's 150th anniversary celebration in 1977, the Chessie System sent #2101 on a national tour as the "Chessie Steam Special". Painted in the Chessie System motif, the train consisted of the locomotive, two tenders, and 18 to 20 passenger and baggage cars. In March 1979, the locomotive was severely damaged in a fire while stored in a Chessie System roundhouse in Silver Grove, Kentucky. It has since been cosmetically restored to its American Freedom Train paint scheme, and is on static display at the National Museum of Railroad History & Innovation, although has been exposed to the elements for most of its time there. In October 2023, the locomotive was moved into the museum's shops to undergo a cosmetic restoration.

In 2017, the Lake Shore Railway Historical Society acquired C&O 8272, a GE B30-7. It has been restored in the Chessie System paint scheme and currently resides at the Lake Shore Railway Museum in North East, Pennsylvania, and most recently, an EMD GP15T (C&O 1507) was donated to the National Museum of Railroad History & Innovation.

== Heritage units ==
In 2015, CSX used decals to decorate two of its locomotives in the livery of predecessor railroads. CSX AC4400CW 366 bears the "Chess-C" and C40-8W 7765 has the "B&O" logo. 366's decal was later damaged by fire and removed.

In June 2023, GE ES44AH unit #1973 entered service, being repaired and painted at CSX shops in Waycross, GA with a CSX blue and yellow color scheme on the front (nose) and cab of the locomotive and throughout the rest of the locomotive, the classic yellow and red Chessie System scheme. It was numbered #1973 in homage to the year the Chessie System was created.

== Book sources ==
- Solomon, Brian (2005). CSX. Saint Paul, MN: MBI Publishing Co. ISBN 978-0-7603-1796-9. OCLC 57641636.
