= Seaboard System Railroad =

Defunct American Class I railway

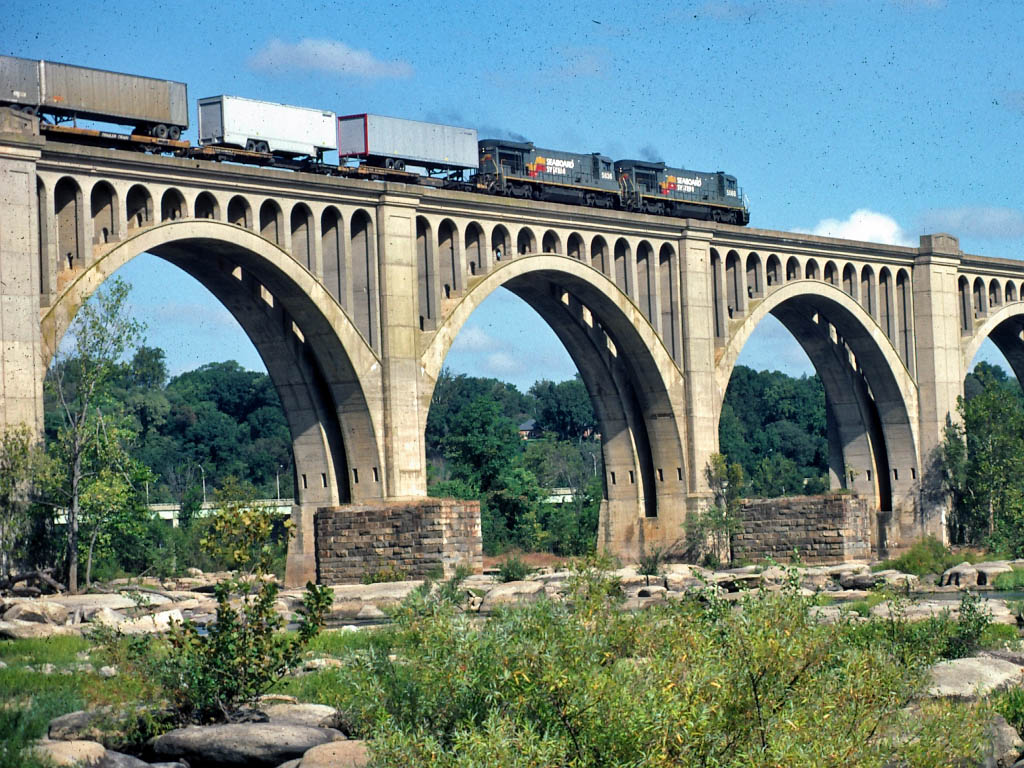
- A Seaboard freight train crosses the James River at Richmond, Virginia, in October 1985.

Overview
- Headquarters: Seaboard System Railroad Building, 500 Water Street, Jacksonville, Florida
- Reporting mark: SBD
- Locale: Southeastern United States Alabama, Florida, Georgia, Illinois, Indiana, Kentucky, Louisiana, Mississippi, Missouri, North Carolina, Ohio, South Carolina, Tennessee, Virginia
- Dates of operation: December 29, 1982–July 1, 1986
- Predecessors: Seaboard Coast Line; Louisville and Nashville; Clinchfield Railroad; Georgia Railroad; Atlanta and West Point Railroad; Western Railway of Alabama
- Successor: CSX Transportation

States The Seaboard System Railroad, Inc. (reporting mark SBD) or The Seaboard System Railroad was a short-lived American Class I railroad that operated from 1982 to 1986 in the Southeastern United States.

Since the late 1960s, Seaboard Coast Line Industries had operated the Seaboard Coast Line and its sister railroads—notably the Louisville & Nashville and Clinchfield—as the "Family Lines System". In 1980, SCLI merged with the Chessie System to create the holding company CSX Corporation; two years later, CSX merged the Family Lines railroads to create the Seaboard System Railroad.

In 1986, Seaboard renamed itself CSX Transportation, which absorbed the Chessie System's two major railroads the following year.

== History ==
The Seaboard System Railroad's roots trace back to SCL Industries, a holding company created in 1968 that combined the Seaboard Coast Line's subsidiary railroads into one entity. In 1969, SCL was renamed Seaboard Coast Line Industries, which was known as the Family Lines System from 1972 to 1982, to better compete with the Southern Railway System. This entity adopted its own logo and colors, but each railroad maintained its own identity. Over time, this caused confusion among customers. In comparison to the neighboring Chessie System, which had four railroads, the Family Lines had six railroads. In 1971 SCL bought out the remaining shares and made the Louisville & Nashville a subsidiary.

On November 1, 1980, Seaboard Coast Line Industries and Chessie System merged under the holding company CSX Corporation. Over the following seven years, the Chessie and Seaboard's various railroads were gradually merged into one.

On December 29, 1982, the Seaboard Coast Line and Louisville & Nashville (under the Family Lines entity) were merged to form the Seaboard System Railroad, Inc.

Considered as a "temporary railroad", the Seaboard System quickly began to merge the smaller railroads that were owned under the Family Lines System entity. This included the Georgia Railroad and the Clinchfield Railroad (1983), South Carolina Pacific Railway (April 30, 1984), Louisville, Henderson & St. Louis Railway (July 1984), Gainesville Midland (1985), Atlanta & West Point Railroad (June 1986) and the Columbia, Newberry & Laurens (June 1986). These mergers simplified equipment and management alongside the Chessie System railroads (Chesapeake & Ohio, Baltimore & Ohio, Western Maryland).

The Seaboard System renamed itself CSX Transportation on July 1, 1986. On April 30, 1987, the Baltimore & Ohio Railroad was merged into the Chesapeake & Ohio. Finally, on August 31, 1987, the Chesapeake & Ohio (still under the Chessie System entity for corporate reasons) was merged into CSX Transportation. All the major railroads under CSX Corporation were now one company.

The Western Railway of Alabama would remain an operating subsidiary until December 2002, when it was finally merged into CSX.

The Family Lines logo included the six systems that were grouped under the name.

== Equipment colors and painting ==
After creation of the Family Lines name, SCLI begin painting locomotives in a standardized paint scheme. When the Seaboard System came into being, the new scheme retained the grey, red, and yellow colors were of the Family Lines scheme. The new Seaboard System also had a new logo featuring a coupled variation font of ITC Eras Demi. The first locomotive to be decorated with the new Seaboard System paint scheme was Uceta GP16 #4802 in October 1982. Because the merger did not occur until December, locomotives after October 1982 were to receive the Seaboard System paint scheme with the existing railroad's reporting marks applied.

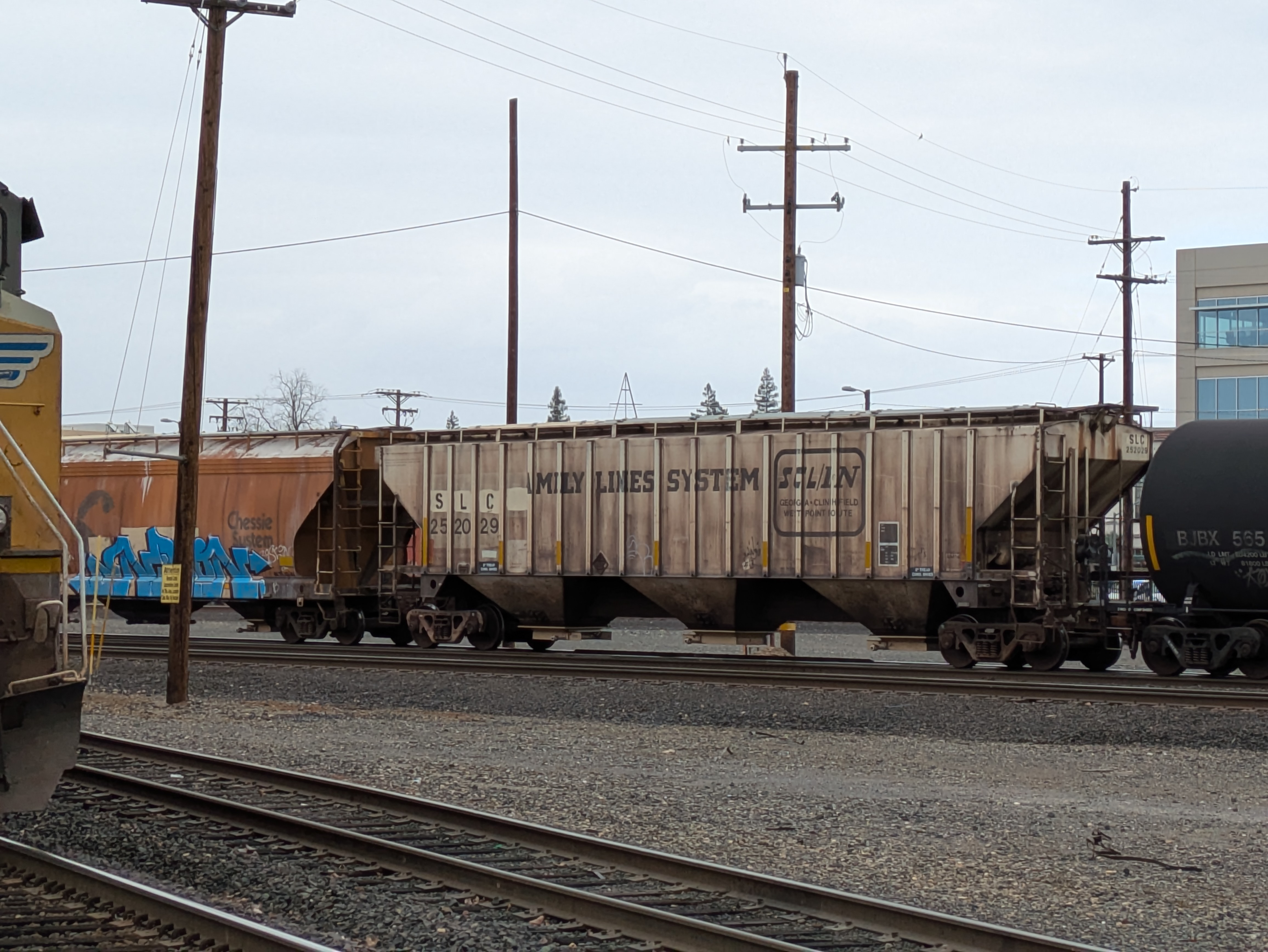
A former Family Lines Hopper Car

When the merger officially took effect on January 1, 1983, all former reporting marks were to be either removed or patched with SBD initials. Shortly before taking delivery of the L&N specified EMD SD50's, Seaboard adopted a Swis721 type font for reporting marks and numbers, instead of the customized Seaboard Coast Line lettering seen on pre-1983 repaints. To simplify its locomotive roster and meet Chessie System specifications, Seaboard introduced a numbering system that partially became meshed within the Chessie System locomotive fleet, and removed any existing Mars Lights or Gyralights from locomotives. Any new locomotives purchased by Seaboard would be built to meet Chessie specifications; of which only three, EMD SD50, EMD MP15T and GE B36-7, were ordered.

== Heritage Units ==
In June 2023, GE ES44AH unit #1982 entered service, being repaired and repainted at CSX shops in Waycross, GA with a CSX blue and yellow color scheme on the front (nose) and cab of the locomotive and throughout the rest of the locomotive, the classic grey Seaboard System scheme. It was numbered #1982 in homage to the year the Seaboard System was created. A second heritage unit featuring The Family Lines System, a GE Evolution Series GE ES44AH unit #1972 entered service in March 2024.

== Operating divisions ==
This section lists the operating divisions of the Seaboard System as of January 1, 1985:

- Atlanta
- Birmingham
- Corbin
- Evansville
- Florence
- Jacksonville
- Louisville
- Mobile
- Nashville
- Raleigh
- Savannah
- Tampa
