= Chesapeake and Ohio Railway =

Former railroad network in northeastern United States

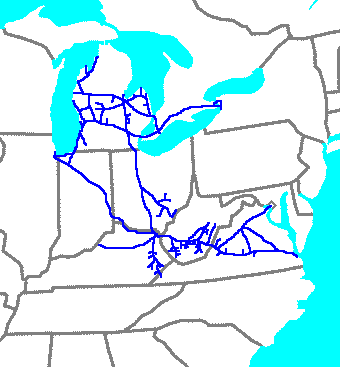
- C&O system map in 1950

Overview
- Headquarters: Cleveland, Ohio, U.S.
- Reporting mark: C&O, CO
- Locale: Illinois, Indiana, Kentucky, Michigan, New York, Ohio, Ontario, Pennsylvania, Virginia, West Virginia, Wisconsin, and Washington, D.C.
- Dates of operation: 1868–1987
- Predecessor: Louisa Railroad
- Successor: CSX

Technical
- Track gauge: 4 ft 8 1/2 in (1,435 mm) standard gauge
- Length: 5,067 mi (8,155 km)

The Chesapeake and Ohio Railway (reporting marks C&O, CO) was a Class I railroad formed in 1869 in Virginia from several smaller Virginia railroads begun in the 19th century. Led by industrialist Collis Potter Huntington, it reached from Virginia's capital city of Richmond to the Ohio River by 1873, where the railroad town (and later city) of Huntington, West Virginia, was named for him.

== History ==
=== 19th century ===
The C&O traces its origins to the Louisa Railroad of Louisa County, Virginia, begun in 1836. By 1850, the Louisa was built east to Richmond and west to Charlottesville, and in keeping with its new and larger vision, was renamed the Virginia Central Railroad. The Commonwealth of Virginia owned a portion of Virginia Central stock and financed the Blue Ridge Railroad to accomplish the task of crossing the first mountain barrier to the west.

During the American Civil War, the Virginia Central played a key role in several battles but was a target for Federal armies. By 1865, it only had five miles of track still in operation and almost no cash to rebuild. Officials realized that they would have to get capital to rebuild from outside the economically devastated South and succeeded in getting Collis Huntington interested. He supplied the Virginians with the money needed to complete the line through what is now West Virginia. The old Covington and Ohio Railroad properties were conveyed to the C&O in keeping with its new mission of linking the Atlantic Ocean with the "Western Waters" of the Ohio River.

Huntington intended to connect the C&O with his Western and Midwestern holdings, but ended up stopping construction at the Ohio River. Thus the only connection to the West was by packet boats operating on the river. Because the mineral resources of West Virginia and Kentucky had not been fully realized yet, the C&O suffered through the bad times brought on by the financial panic Depression of 1873, and went into receivership in 1878. When reorganized it was renamed The Chesapeake and Ohio Railway Company.

1892 C & O route map

Conditions improved in the 1880s, when coal resources began to be developed and shipped eastward. the Peninsula Extension was completed from Richmond to the new city of Newport News located on Hampton Roads, the East's largest ice-free port. Transportation of coal to Newport News where it was loaded on coastwise shipping and transported to the Northeast became a staple of the C&O's business at this time.

In 1888, the C&O built the Cincinnati Division from Huntington down the South bank of the Ohio River and across the river at Cincinnati, connecting with the "Big Four" and other Midwestern Railroads.

=== 20th century ===
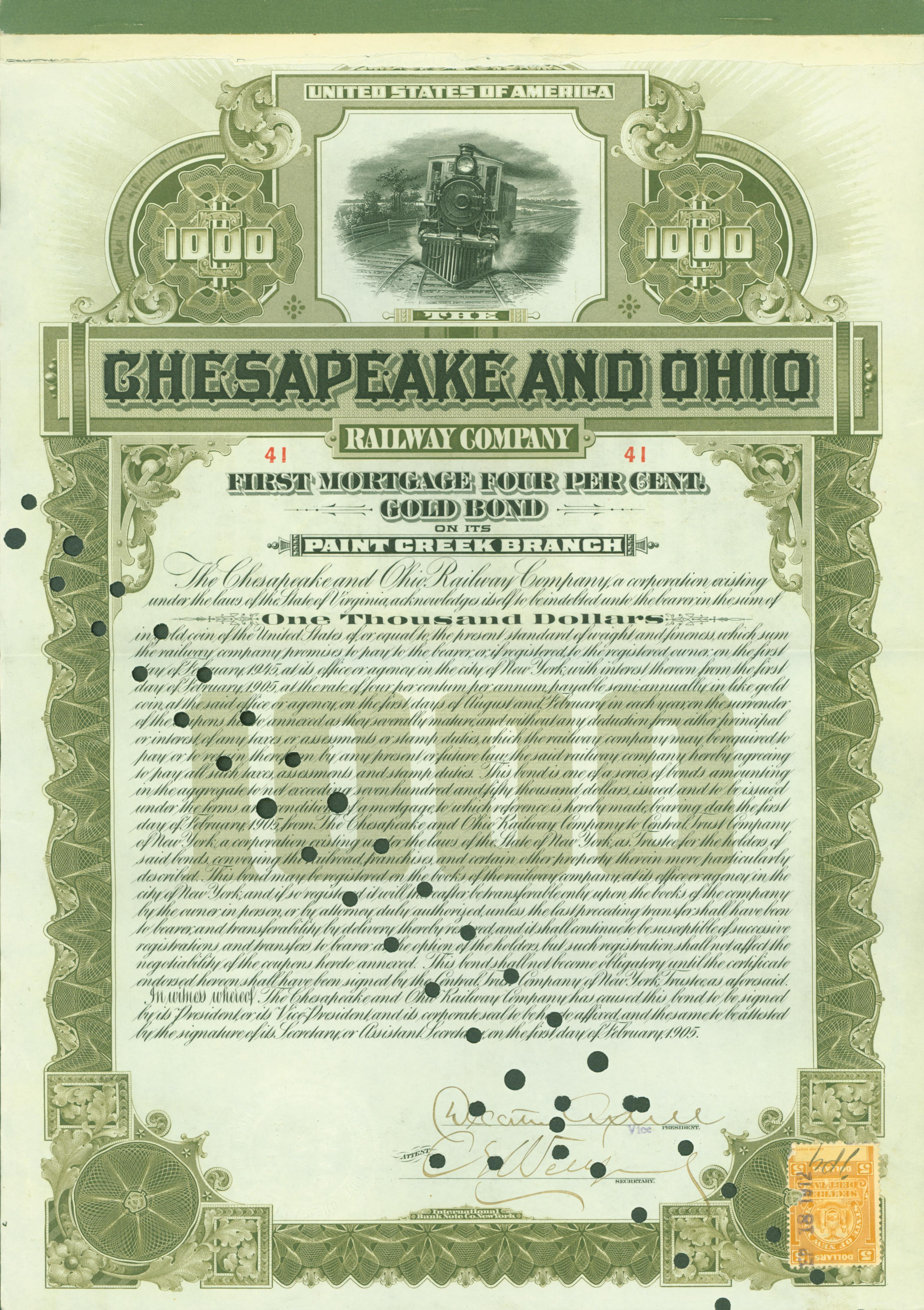
Gold Bond of the Chesapeake and Ohio Railway Company, issued 1. February 1905

From 1900 to 1920, most of the C&O's line tapping the rich bituminous coal fields of West Virginia and Kentucky were completed, and the C&O as it was known throughout the rest of the 20th Century was essentially in place.

In 1910, the C&O absorbed the Chicago, Cincinnati and Louisville Railroad, which had been built diagonally across the state of Indiana from Cincinnati to Hammond in the preceding decade. This gave the C&O a direct line from Cincinnati to the great railroad hub of Chicago.

The first small terminal and repair shops were located at Richmond beginning in 1860. After expanding to Huntington in 1872, the primary back shops were established on 100 acres of land along Fifth Avenue. These facilities were expanded and modernized over a five-year period in three phases beginning in 1916. Another large shop site was established at Clifton Forge, Virginia in 1890 on 1,200 acres of land, including the classification yard. In 1929 the system's primary freight car repair and erecting facility was built at the west end of the mammoth yard at Russell, Kentucky, called the Raceland Car Shops.

By the early 1960s, the C&O was headquartered in Cleveland, Ohio. In 1972, under the leadership of Cyrus Eaton, it became part of the Chessie System, along with the Baltimore and Ohio and Western Maryland Railway. The Chessie System was later combined with the Seaboard Coast Line and Louisville and Nashville, both the primary components of the Family Lines System, to become a key portion of CSX Transportation (CSXT) in the 1980s.

C&O's passenger services ended in 1971 with the formation of Amtrak. Today, Amtrak's tri-weekly Cardinal passenger train follows the historic and scenic route of the C&O through the New River Gorge in one of the more rugged sections of West Virginia. The rails of the former C&O also continue to transport intermodal and freight traffic, as well as West Virginia bituminous coal east to Hampton Roads and west to the Great Lakes as part of CSXT, a Fortune 500 company which was one of seven Class I railroads operating in North America at the beginning of the 21st century.

At the end of 1970, C&O operated 5,067 mi (8,155 km) of road on 10,219 mi (16,446 km) of track, not including WM or B&O and its subsidiaries.

== Passenger Operations and the "Chessie" Cat mascot ==
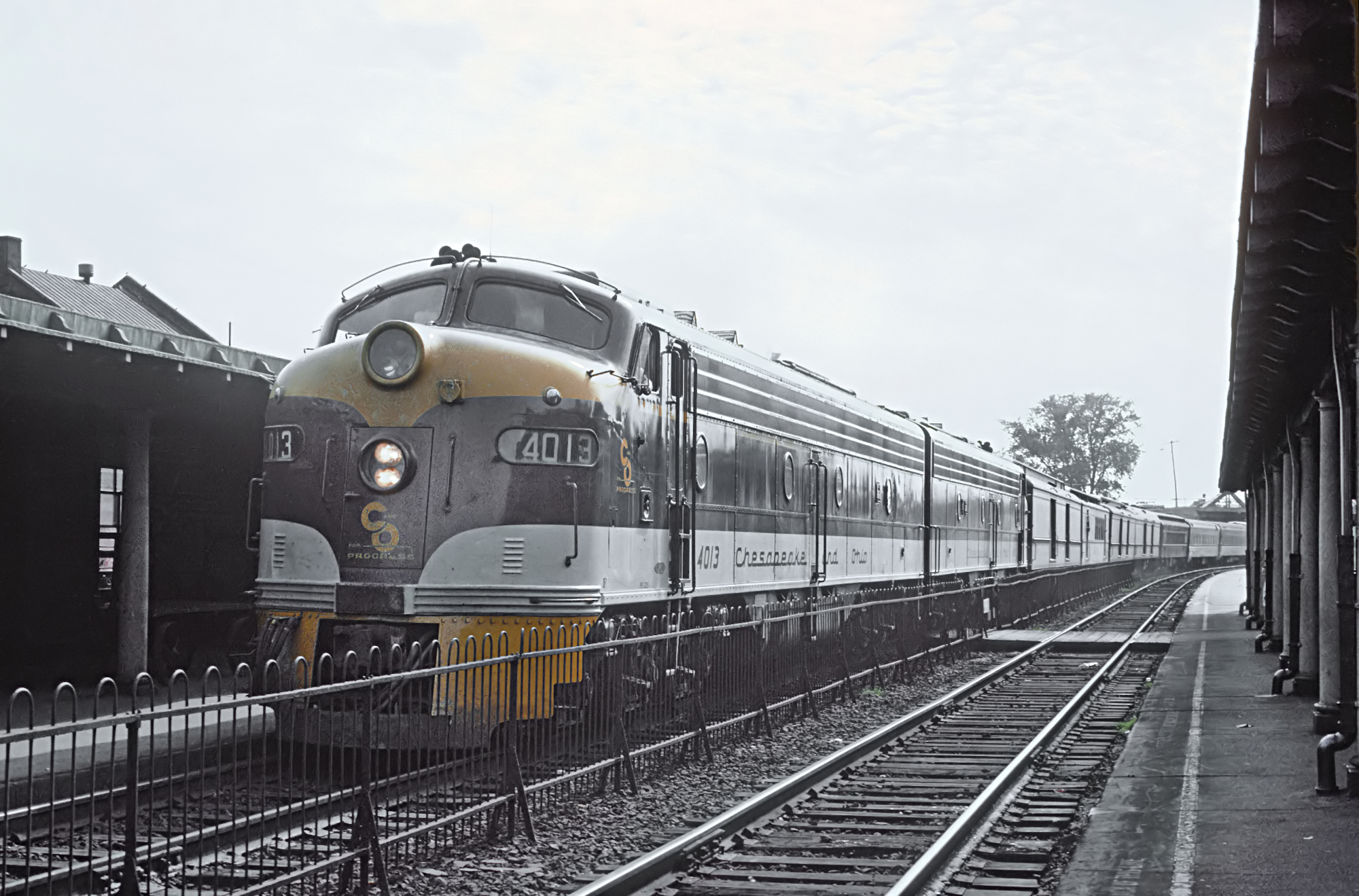
The Chesapeake and Ohio's Sportsman at Alexandria, VA in August 1964.

The Chesapeake and Ohio Railway never spent lavishly on streamlined passenger trains, or passenger service in general, opting to put most of its resources into moving coal and freight. While the George Washington was the railroad's flagship, the Sportsman (which connected Detroit with Washington, D.C., and Newport News) and the Resort Special were also well-traveled trains on the system. Much of the reason for the popularity of C&O's passenger trains was because of Chessie, the sleeping kitten, one of the most successful and fondly remembered marketing campaigns ever developed. Chessie was so popular when she debuted in 1933 that the C&O could not keep enough merchandise in stock.

The C&O mostly focused on passenger trains in the eastern half of its system. Despite connecting to Chicago, the largest rail hub and third largest city in the country, passenger service to it was discontinued in 1933. Trains continued to run as west as Hammond, Indiana, a Chicago suburb, until 1950. It had accessed the city's Central Station (and previously, Dearborn Station) via the former Chicago, Cincinnati and Louisville Line.

Chessie sported two kittens, Nip and Tuck. During World War II, Chessie's "husband" — Peake — (creating the name "Chessie Peak", as in Chesapeake) was shown with a bandage on his paw as a war veteran returning from military service.

While the kitten was created by the Austrian artist Guido Grünewald, the success of Chessie as a marketing tool is often credited to Lionel Probert, at the time an assistant to the C&O president.

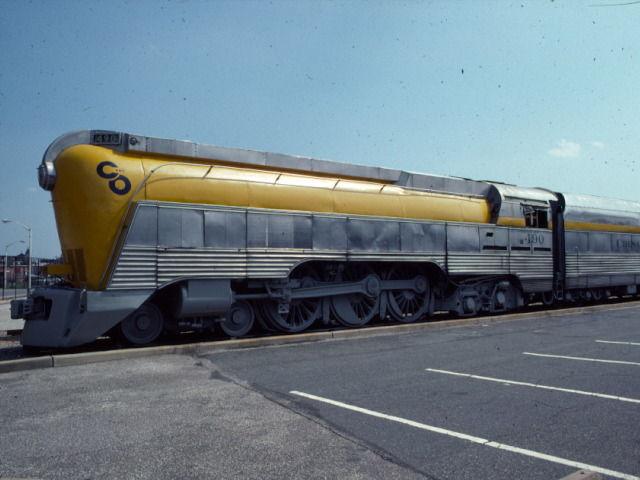
The preserved C&O class L 4-6-4 locomotive No. 490 shows the streamlining that was applied to it and similar locomotives in the 1940s

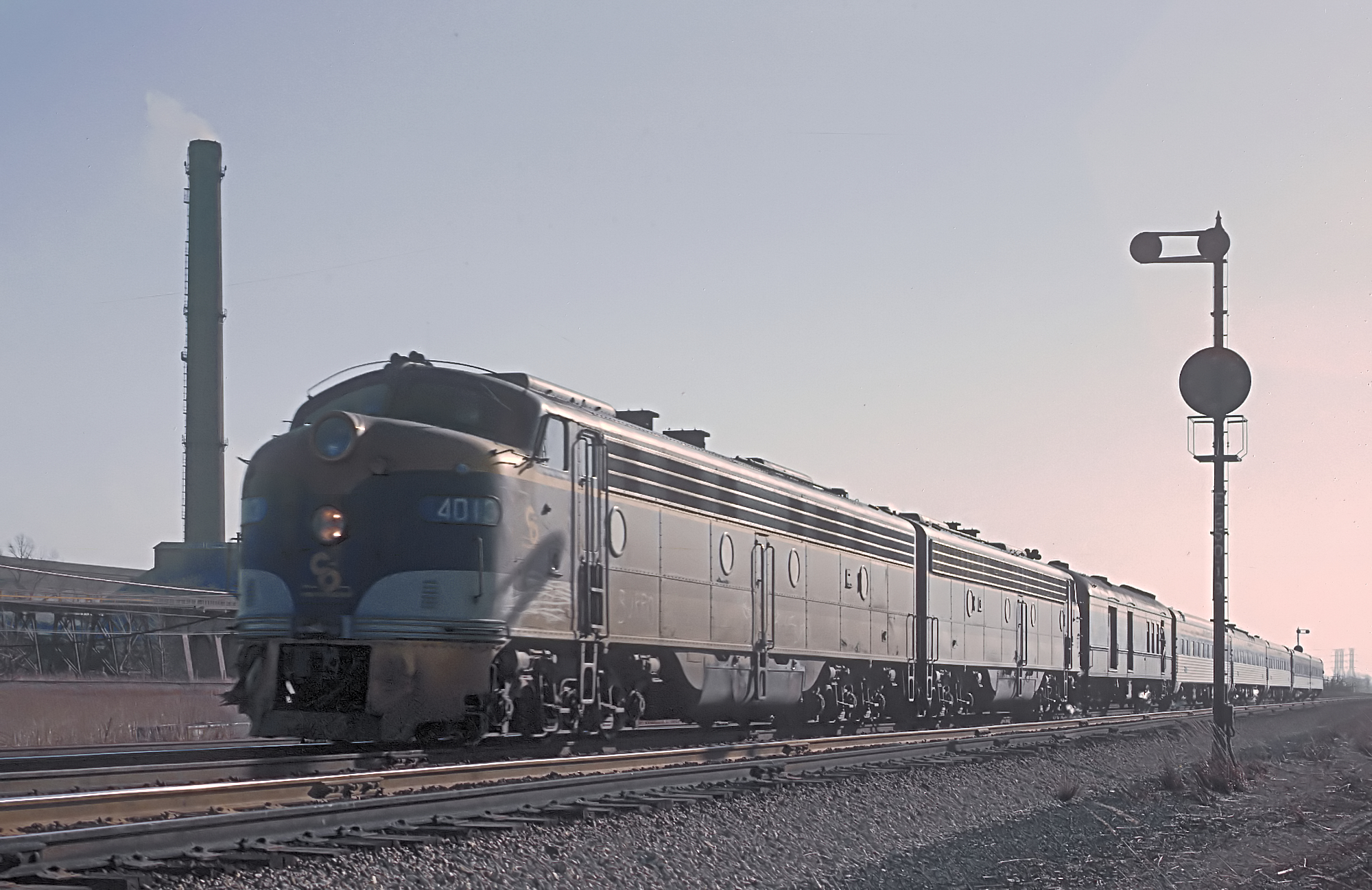
The Chesapeake and Ohio Railway's Pere Marquette near Gary, IN on November 26, 1965

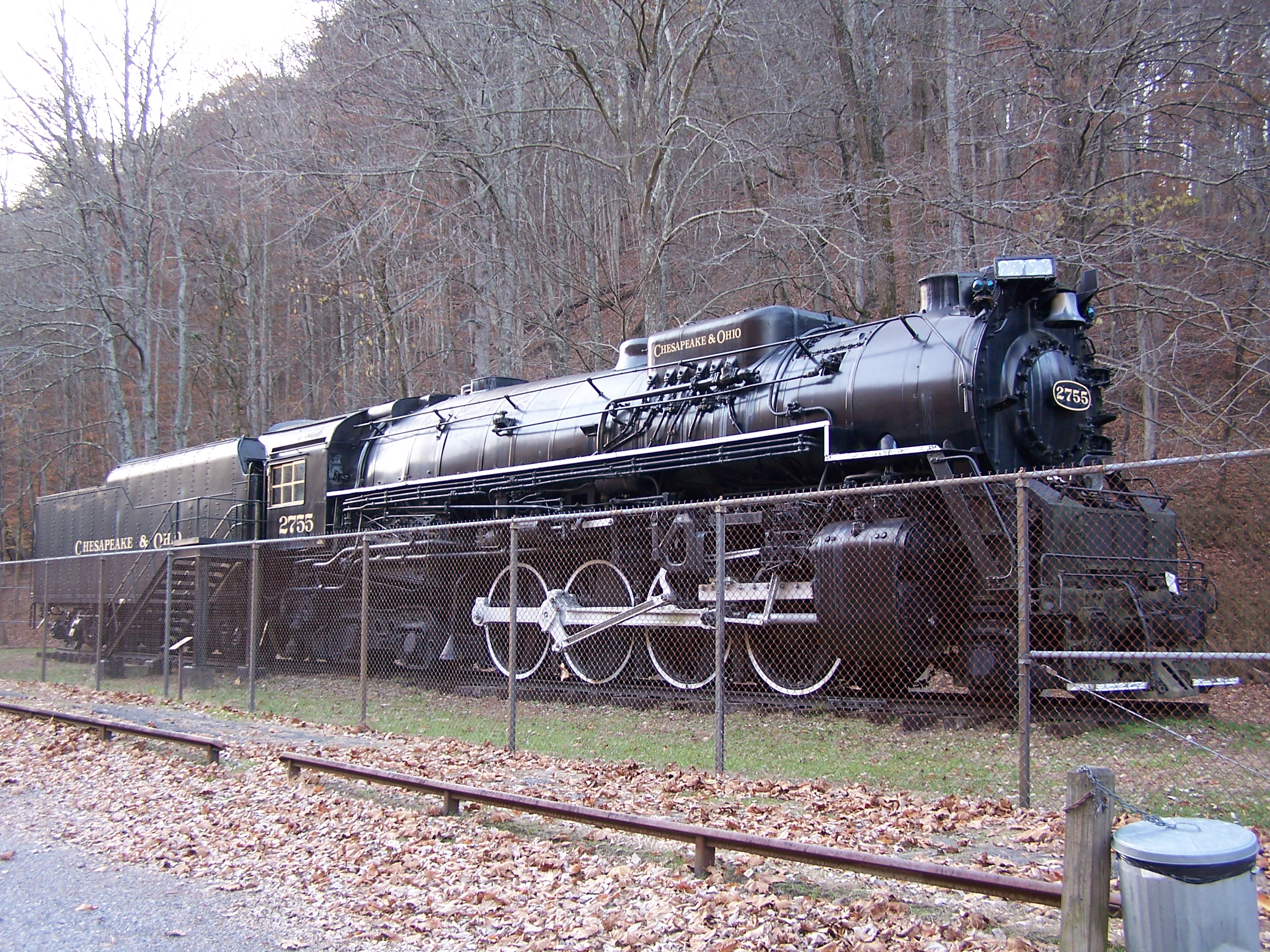
Chesapeake and Ohio 2755, a 2-8-4 Class K-4 "Kanawha" built by American Locomotive Company in 1947, at Chief Logan State Park

=== Chessie System, CSX ===
C&O continued to be one of the more profitable and financially sound railways in the United States, and in 1963, under the guidance of Cyrus S. Eaton, helped start the modern merger era by "affiliating" with the Baltimore & Ohio. The two lines' services, personnel, motive power and rolling stock, and facilities were gradually integrated. Under the leadership of Hays T. Watkins, in 1973 Chessie System was created as a holding company for the C&O, B&O and Western Maryland Railway. In effect, C&O formally adopted a nickname that had been used colloquially for the railroad for several years, after the mascot kitten used in ads since 1933.

Under Watkins' leadership, Chessie System then merged with Seaboard Coast Line Industries, holding company for Seaboard Coast Line Railroad and several other great railroads of the Southeast (including Louisville and Nashville Railroad, Clinchfield Railroad and others) to form CSX Corporation, with Chessie and SCL as its leading subsidiaries. Watkins became CEO of the merged company.

Over the next five years, the CSX railroads began consolidating into one mega-railroad. The process began when SCL merged its railroads into the Seaboard System Railroad in 1982.

Western Maryland was merged into B&O on May 1, 1983. B&O was merged into C&O on April 30, 1987. Seaboard changed its name to CSX Transportation on July 1, 1986. Finally, C&O merged into CSX Transportation on Aug. 31, 1987. After acquiring 42% of Conrail in 1999, CSX became one of four major railroad systems left in the country.

== See also ==
- C&O desk, donated to the White House
- List of Chesapeake and Ohio locomotives
- George Washington, the C&O's premier passenger train from 1932 to 1971
- Charles T. Hinde, Successful businessman and riverboat captain.
- Greenbrier River Trail
- John Henry (folklore)
