= Chief Logan State Park =

State park in Logan County, West Virginia

- IUCN category V (protected landscape/seascape)
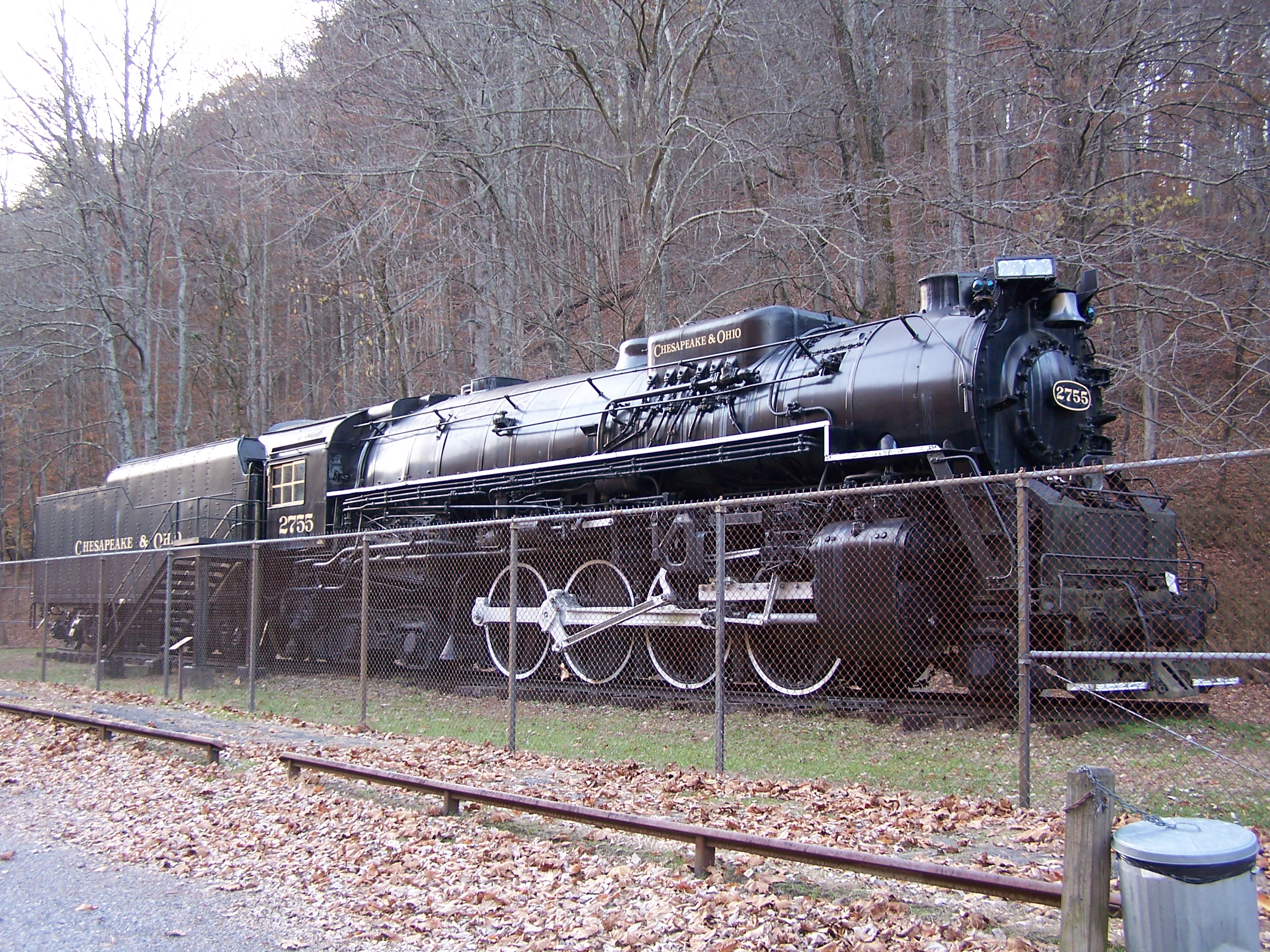
- C&O 2755 Kanawha-class locomotive on static display

- Location within West Virginia
- Location: Logan, West Virginia, United States
- Coordinates: 37°53′38″N 82°01′05″W
- Area: 3,988 acres (16.14 km^{2})
- Elevation: 1,289 ft (393 m)
- Established: 1969
- Named for: Chief Logan
- Governing body: West Virginia Division of Natural Resources
- Website: wvstateparks.com/park/chief-logan-state-park/

Chief Logan State Park is located on 3,988 acres (1,614 ha) about 4 miles (6.4 km) north of Logan in Logan County, West Virginia, United States. The park, the town and the county were all named after Chief Logan, a Mingo (or Ohio Iroquois) Native American leader who lived in the region before the American Revolutionary War. Each summer the Liz Spurlock Amphitheater at Chief Logan State Park is the site for outdoor dramas, including the historical drama "The Aracoma Story" about Shawnee tribal members who lived at the present-day location of the town of Logan. The outdoor drama theater produces the Aracoma story and two to three other plays or musicals every year.

The new Chief Logan Lodge and Conference Center opened at the park during the summer of 2006. There is also a fishing pond on site and a recreation center that has weights, exercise machines, courts and an Olympic sized indoor pool.

== Museum in the Park ==
The Museum in the Park features changing art and history exhibits drawn from the collections of the West Virginia State Museum, including one exhibit on local and regional history. The museum is open from Wednesday through Sunday, and also offers special programs.

== Features ==
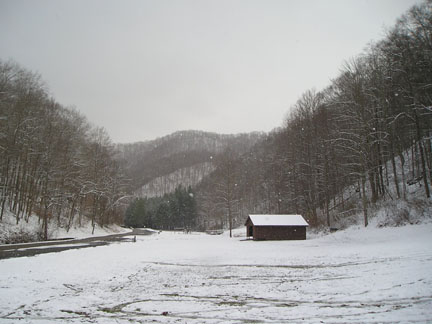
Wintertime at Chief Logan State Park

- Chief Logan Lodge and Conference Center (75 rooms, indoor pool)
- Restaurant
- Outdoor swimming pool
- Liz Spurlock Outdoor Amphitheater
- 25 camping sites (14 with electrical hookup)
- Miniature golf
- Hiking trails (18 miles)
- 7 picnic pavilions
- Wildlife exhibit featuring animals native to West Virginia, including black bears, bobcats, barred owls, red-shouldered hawks, wild boar and native reptiles
- C & O Kanawha class steam locomotive #2755 (static display)

== Accessibility ==
Accessibility for the disabled was assessed by West Virginia University. The assessment found Chief Logan State Park to be generally accessible. The 2005 evaluation found issues regarding access to some walkways and ramps. The report was unclear about accessibility to the outdoor amphitheater and outdoor swimming pool. The new Chief Logan Lodge and Conference Center is completely accessible.

== See also ==
- List of West Virginia state parks
- State park
- Logan's Lament
