= Alleghany, Virginia =

Unincorporated community in Virginia, United States

Coordinates: 37°44′50″N 80°14′25″W

Alleghany is an unincorporated community in Alleghany County, Virginia, United States.
