= Pour point depressant =

Pour point depressants are used to allow the use of petroleum based mineral oils at lower temperatures. The lowest temperature at which a fuel or oil will pour is called a pour point. Wax crystals, which form at lower temperatures, may interfere with lubrication of mechanical equipment. High-quality pour point depressants can lower a pour point of an oil additive by as much as 40°C.

== Methods ==
Pour point depressants do not lower the temperature at which wax crystals begin to form, called the cloud point, or the amount of wax that is formed—pour point depressants work by altering the crystal shape and size, which inhibits lateral crystal growth. There are two known methods by which this may be achieved: surface adsorption and co-crystallization.

== Types ==
Any reduction in an oil's pour point depends on both the composition and properties of the oil, as well as the type of pour point depressant used. Other factors are the substance's relative molecular weight, its chemical composition, and the substance's concentration in the oil. If the concentration of pour point depressant is too high, there may be a visible effect on viscosity at higher temperatures.

Pour point depressants are only effective on refined oils. Non-refined oils contain polyaromatic hydrocarbons and resins which act as antagonists against synthetic pour point depressants. Pour point depressants are also ineffective for engine oils with a viscosity above SAE 30. Generally they are most effective on thinner oils like SAE 10, SAE 20 or SAE 30 grade oils.

Alkylaromatics and aliphatic polymers are two types of pour point depressants that are commercially available. Most commercially available pour point depressants are organic polymers, but nonpolymeric substances such as phenyltristearyloxysilane and pentaerythritol tetrastearate may also be effective.

== Winter 1980-1981 ==
In 1981 there was a problem with lubricating oil pumpability. The same thing happened the following winter, along with reports that oil would not flow out of containers. The issue seemed to be caused by olefin copolymers which caused the oil to gel in cold temperatures.
