= Winter diesel fuel =

Diesel fuel with additives to prevent gelling in cold weather

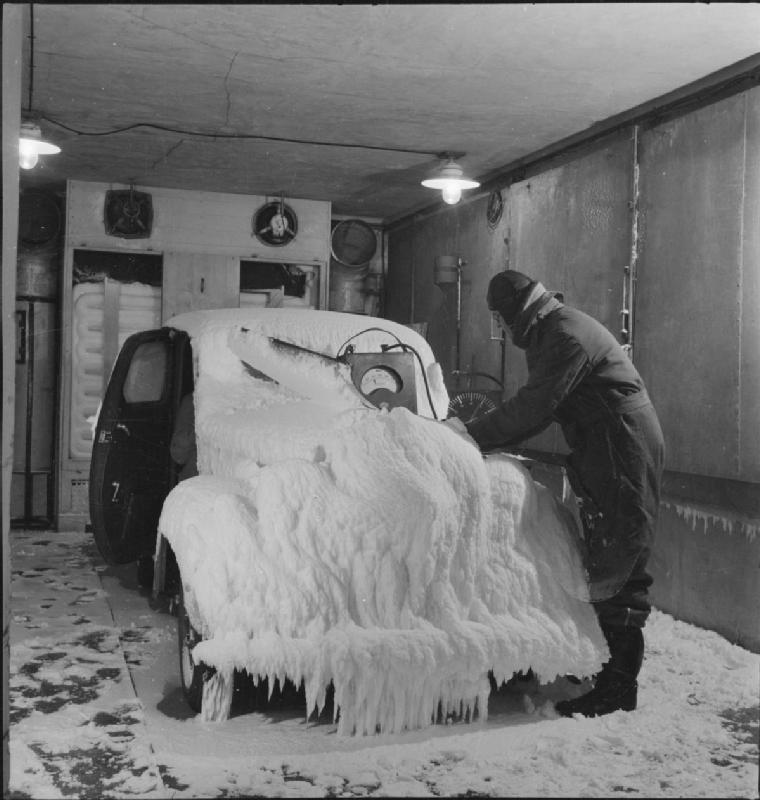
Testing the cold start capability of an engine after three days in a cold chamber. (car maker facilities in the UK, 1945)

Winter diesel fuel (also known as winter diesel, alpine diesel, or winterised diesel) refers to diesel fuel enhanced to prevent it from gelling in cold weather conditions. In general it is achieved by treatment with additives that change the low temperature characteristics of the fuel.

== Operation ==
Diesel fuel is prone to waxing or gelling in cold weather; both are terms for the solidification of diesel oil into a partially crystalline state. Below the cloud point the fuel begins to develop solid wax particles giving it a cloudy appearance. The presence of solidified waxes thickens the oil and clogs fuel filters and injectors in engines. The crystals build up in the fuel line (especially in fuel filters) until the engine is starved of fuel, causing it to stop running.

The cold filter plugging point (CFPP) is based on a standardized test that indicates the rate at which diesel fuel will flow through a standardized filtration device in a specified length of time when cooled under certain conditions. Similarly the "Low Temperature Flow Test" (ASTM D4539) indicates the winter performance of diesel with improver additives. Note that both the CFPP and LTFT temperature is some degrees above the pour point temperature at which diesel fuel loses its fluid character and that pumps would stop operating.

There are a number of solutions available which allow diesel engines to continue to operate in cold weather conditions. Once the diesel motor is started it may continue to operate at temperatures below the CFPP – most engines have a spill return system, by which any excess fuel from the injector pump and injectors is returned to the fuel tank. When the engine has warmed, returning warm fuel should prevent gelling in the tank.

=== Fuel Preheater ===
Low-output electric heaters in fuel tanks and around fuel lines are a way to extend the fluid characteristics of diesel fuel. This is a standard equipment in vehicles that operate in arctic weather conditions.

As the fuel filter is the first point to become clogged up, most diesel motor cars are equipped with a filter heater. This allows summer diesel with a CFPP of –7 °C to be operated safely in –20 °C weather conditions. The fluid characteristics of winter diesel are also extended allowing a diesel type of CFPP –15 °C to be operated safely in –24 °C weather conditions. Note that a filter heater cannot melt wax particles in the feed system so that fuel supply can be problematic at cold start.

=== Additives ===
Retail stores offer a number of additives that will lower the CFPP of diesel oil. These will only be effective when added above the Cloud Point as the additive needs to mix well with the diesel oil – ideally the additive should be added at the fuel station when the fuel is still warm from the storage tanks.

The additives will not prevent the diesel from developing wax particles but these are hindered from melding together to form larger wax flakes that can clog up the fuel filter. In comparison with blending diesel fuel with lighter fuel (that has a lower CFPP) the usage of additives is cheaper and gas stations in cold regions offer diesel fuel with additives at no extra cost (see below). If the gas station offers winterized diesel you should not add additional additives – the fluid characteristics may deteriorate due to incompatible additives and the CFPP enhancement may be reversed.

=== Blending ===
In North America, gas stations offer two types of diesel fuel – according to ASTM D975 these are named No. 1 and No. 2 fuel. No. 1 fuel (similar to kerosene) has a natural CFPP of -40 °C but it is more expensive than No. 2 fuel. Adding No. 1 fuel will lower the CFPP of No. 2 fuel – adding 10% will lower the CFPP temperature by about 5 degrees.

For some diesel motors it is also possible to add even lighter fuels like gasoline to extend the CFPP characteristics. Some car makers were recommending adding up to 20% gasoline to permit operation in cold weather (at the price of higher consumption) and it had been common practice in Europe where No. 1 fuel is not offered at gas stations. Since the 1990s car makers began selling only direct injection diesel engines – these will not withstand any gasoline portions in the fuel as the high pressure in the injection device will not withstand any loss of lubrication from fuel oil without doing damage to the injectors. High pressure fuel pumps depend on diesel fuel for lubrication and the addition of gasoline will cause adverse wear and eventual failure of the pump.

Car makers selling common rail or Unit Injector diesel engines prohibit the dilution of diesel fuel with either gasoline or kerosene as it may destroy the injection device.

== Winter fuel classes ==
Due to improvements in fuel technology with additives, waxing rarely occurs in any but the coldest weather. In regions with a cold climate, the standard diesel fuel at fuel stations is required to meet certain CFPP characteristics. In Europe this is governed by the EN 590 standard which had originally been created to describe the validation of low-sulphur diesel – its national variants came to include earlier legislation on diesel characteristics in winter conditions. EN 590 statutory regulations exist in all countries of the European Union, as well as Iceland, Norway and Switzerland.

=== Winter diesel ===
For the "temperate" climatic zones, the EN 590 standard defines six classes from A to F. In Central and Western Europe, the winter diesel (Winterdiesel, diesel d'hiver) must meet Class F conditions at least from the beginning of December to the end of February. During a transitional period (mostly October and April), a lower class must be met.

Tests in the Alpine regions have shown that the diesel fuel offered at gas stations extends the law requirements by some degrees, showing a CFPP of −27 °C in all samples. The CloudPoint is not specified in EN 590 although DIN 51603 for heating oil specifies a CloudPoint below +1 °C for CFPP −10 °C. Current additives allow a CFPP of −20 °C to be based on diesel fuel with a CloudPoint of −7 °C.

	Class A	Class B	Class C	Class D	Class E	Class F
CFPP value	+5 °C	0 °C	−5 °C	−10 °C	−15 °C	−20 °C
CloudPoint	(not specified in EN 590)					

=== Arctic diesel ===
For the "arctic" climatic zones, the EN 590 standard defines five classes from 0 to 4. In Scandinavian countries, the winter diesel (Vinterdiesel) must meet Class 2 conditions. Some refiners offer both standard winter diesel and arctic winter diesel in parallel, commonly differentiated as Winter Diesel (Winterdiesel, diesel d'hiver) and Arctic Diesel (Polardiesel, diesel polaires). The low cloud point (CP) of EN 590 ensures that wax particles do not precipitate to the bottom of the tank upon standing because daytime temperatures might melt them together. Properties beyond Class 4 would require a kerosene type fuel with a low cetane number (at least 45 in EN 590).

	Class 0	Class 1	Class 2	Class 3	Class 4
CFPP value	−20 °C	−26 °C	−32 °C	−38 °C	−44 °C
CloudPoint	−10 °C	−16 °C	−22 °C	−28 °C	−34 °C

== Road diesel requirements by country ==
=== Australia ===
The Australian Standard for Automotive Diesel AS 3570 specifies maximum limits for cloud point based on the 12 calendar months and the different climatic regions in Australia. The Standard lists 12 climatic regions and the limits range from −3 °C to 15 °C. Ordinarily, Australian automotive diesel fuels on average have a cold filter plugging point value that is about 2 °C below the cloud point. The Standard also lists particular locations where fuel problems may possibly occur because of cold weather conditions.

Maximum permissible cloud points (AS 3570 –1998)
Jan	Feb	Mar	Apr	May-Jul	Aug	Sep	Oct	Nov	Dec	CP	Locations	
15	10	5	2	1	4	7	11	14	15	°C	AUC	Australia – Central (NT/SA)
15	15	12	9	8	10	14	15	15	15	°C	AUN	Australia – North (WA/NT/QLD)
9	5	2	0	−1	10	14	15	15	15	°C	NSW	New South Wales
15	12	7	4	2	4	7	12	15	15	°C	QC	Queensland – Central
15	15	11	7	6	8	11	15	15	15	°C	QCN	Queensland – Central North
15	15	12	7	7	9	12	15	15	15	°C	QFNE	Queensland – North East
11	7	3	0	-1	0	2	7	9	13	°C	QS	Queensland – South
8	6	4	2	1	2	4	5	6	9	°C	SAS	South Australia – South
3	1	−1	−2	−3	−3	−1	0	2	3	°C	TAS	Tasmania
9	6	3	1	0	1	2	4	6	8	°C	VIC	Victoria
15	15	9	6	5	7	11	15	15	15	°C	WAC	Western Australia – Central
10	6	4	3	2	2	3	5	8	10	°C	WAS	Western Australia – South

=== Austria ===
Winter diesel is required to have a CFPP below –20 °C in winter and in the transitional period below –15 °C. Some premium diesel offers include CFPP guarantees beyond that (OMV MaxxMotion CFPP –35 °C, Aral/BP Ultimate Diesel CFPP –24 °C / –30 °C)

Designation	CFPP value	time frame
Winterdiesel	–20 °C	01.10. – 28.02.
Übergangszeit	–15 °C	01.03. – 31.03.

=== Belgium ===
Belgium has adopted the European standard in NBN EN 590. Winter diesel must at least meet the CFPP –15 °C characteristic by law. At gas stations of the VanRaak group the winter diesel is offered at a CFPP –20 °C in the time frame from 1. November to 28. February, and in the transitional period in October the diesel fuel will meet CFPP –11 °C characteristics. At gas stations of the "power" group the winter time frame is extended thereby offering a CFPP –20 °C winter diesel from 15 October through 15 March

Designation	CFPP value	time frame	EN 590
diesel d'hiver / winterdiesel	–15 °C	01.11. – 28.02.	Class E

=== Canada ===
Canada has an overall arctic climate. The Canadian General Standards Board publishes maps of common low temperatures for each region so that oil companies can adapt the diesel fuel accordingly, which they do about ten times per year. This scheme is inherited from the US Standard ASTM D 975 covering winter diesel (see United States). Measurements have shown that diesel fuel has a Pour Point of –30 °C which is common for arctic diesel in the rest of the world.

=== Czech Republic ===
The time frames and minimum requirements for Czech winter diesel (směsné motorové nafty) is regulated by ČSN EN 590 offering the same classes as the European standard. The diesel fuel must meet the Třída B, Třída D and Třída F classes throughout the year. Additionally there is a common Třída 2 class diesel offered as skiing regions require arctic diesel for the equipment (e.g. snow groomers).

designation	CFPP value	time frame
Třída B	0 °C	15.04. – 30.09.
Třída D	–10 °C	01.10. – 15.11.
Třída F	–20 °C	16.11. – 28.02.
Třída D	–10 °C	01.03. – 14.04.

=== Denmark ===
Diesel fuel is governed by the Danish DS EN 590 standard. It denotes three periods for diesel fuel for Winter (Vinter), Fall (Efterår) and Summer (Sommer) — further values are given the actual results of diesel fuel offered at Shell and Statoil stations in Denmark.

Designation	CFPP value	time frame	real CFPP	real CloudPoint
Sommer	–10 °C	01.04. – 30.09.	–12 °C	0 °C
Efterår	–15 °C	01.10. – 30.11.	–18 °C	–7 °C
Vinter	–20 °C	01.12. – 31.03.	–24 °C	–10 °C

=== Estonia ===
In Estonia, the winter diesel standards confine to EVS-EN 590. Winter diesel fuel must confine to the arctic Klass 1 values.

period	CFPP value	Cloud point	time frame
winter period	–26 °C	–16 °C	01.12. – 29.02.
rest of year	–5 °C	none	01.03. – 31.11.

=== Finland ===
Analysis rules follow the EN 590.

period	CFPP value	time frame
summer period	–5 °C	01.04. – 31.10.
winter period	–26 °C	01.11. – 31.03.
arctic variety	–44 °C	in some locations

=== France ===
In France the required characteristics must meet EN 590 classes of B, E and F for summer diesel, winter diesel and winter blizzards respectively.

Designation	CFPP value	time frame	EN 590
diesel d'été	0 °C	01.05. – 31.10.	Class B
diesel d'hiver	–15 °C	01.11. – 30.04.	Class E

=== Germany ===
The time frame and minimum characteristics are prescribed in DIN EN 590. Some premium diesel characterisations include a CFPP value that extends the winter diesel value by some degrees.(OMV MaxxMotion CFPP –35 °C, Aral/BP Ultimate Diesel CFPP –24 °C / –30 °C)

Designation	CFPP value	time frame
Sommerdiesel	0 °C	15.04. – 30.09.
Übergangszeit	–10 °C	01.10. – 15.11.
Winterdiesel	–20 °C	16.11. – 28.02.
Übergangszeit	–10 °C	01.03. – 14.04.

=== Netherlands ===
The Netherlands has adopted the German DIN standard – a separate standard was not created as most fuel supply for gas stations is organised cross border for example at Shell.

=== Norway ===
Norway has adopted the European standard into its national NS-EN 590 standard. In the mid winter period the standard diesel fuel must meet the arctic winter diesel class 2 conditions (Vinterdiesel Arktisk Grad 2). The time frames may be extended in some regions by about ±14 days.

Classification	CFPP value	time frame
minimum	–11 °C	01.04. – 15.09.
winter diesel	–24 °C	16.09. – 30.11.
arctic diesel	–32 °C	01.12. – 28.02.
winter diesel	–24 °C	01.03. – 30.03.

=== Poland ===
The legal minimum time frames are usually extended by gas stations by a few weeks and in very cold winter conditions gas stations will switch to arctic winter diesel with a CFPP of –32 °C, in some regions even requiring arctic diesel atr –40 °C. Some premium diesel offers have a better CFPP irrespective of the actual weather conditions (BP Ultimate Diesel CFPP –30 °C all-seasons, Statoil DieselGold/SupraDiesel CFPP –40 °C in winter)

period	CFPP value	time frame
transitional	–10 °C	01.10. – 15.11.
winter times	–20 °C	16.11. – 28.02.
transitional	–10 °C	01.03. – 15.04.

=== Russia ===
The regulations in Russia refer to the GOST 305-82 «Топливо дизельное. Технические условия» (diesel fuel. technical requirements). The standard defines three climatic types of diesel fuel:

Designation	density (max)	flash point (min)	pour point (max)	cetan number (min)	viscosity (20 °C)
Летнее дизельное топливо (summer diesel fuel)	860 kg/m^{3}	62 °C	–5 °C	45	3.0–6.0 mm²/s
Зимнее дизельное топливо (winter diesel fuel)	840 kg/m^{3}	40 °C	–35 °C	45	1.8–5.0 mm²/s
Арктическое дизельное топливо (arctic diesel fuel)	830 kg/m^{3}	35 °C	–50 °C	40	1.4–4.0 mm²/s

=== Spain ===
Analysis rules follow the EN 590.

period	CFPP value	time frame
summer period	0 °C	01.04. – 30.09.
winter period	–10 °C	01.10. – 31.03.

=== Sweden ===
Sweden has ratified the European norm in SS-EN 590. The Swedish standard SS 155435 for diesel fuel (introduced in 1972 and last updated in 2016) is still maintained to extend the requirements for Ultra Low Sulfur Diesel classes. Through different taxation the offered diesel fuel generally follows the extended specifications of the Swedish standard.

Circle-K provider delivers winter diesel with a CFFP of –32 °C the whole year. The OKQ8 company offers two types depending on the region with currently two areas separated by the Dalälven river at 60° north latitude.

diesel class	CFPP value	time frame
Söder om Dalälven (southern diesel)	−24/−26 °C	all-season
Norr om Dalälven (northern diesel)	−32/−35 °C	all-season

=== Switzerland ===
Although the Swiss standard SN EN 590 has specifications for both summer and winter diesel the market only offers a single diesel type throughout the year ("Ganzjahresdiesel") that will meet the winter characteristics during all seasons. Some premium diesel characterisations include a CFPP value that extends the winter diesel value by some degrees. (OMV MaxxMotion CFPP –35 °C, Aral/BP Ultimate Diesel CFPP –24 °C / -30 °C, Agrola Diesel cleanline CFPP –30 °C)

Designation	CFPP value	time frame
Ganzjahresdiesel	–20 °C	all-seasons

=== United Kingdom ===
The United Kingdom differentiates diesel fuel into Summer and Winter Fuel according to BS EN 590 and BS EN14214 (biodiesel). The same numbers are used in the Republic of Ireland. Distribution of winter biodiesel in the United Kingdom starts in November and ends in March.

Designation	CFPP value	time frame	Cloud Point
Summer Fuel	−5 °C	16/03–15/11	3 °C
Winter Fuel	−15 °C	16/11–15/03	−5 °C

=== United States ===
In the United States there is no legislation on a fixed time frame when winter diesel must meet a specific temperature characteristic. The ASTM D 975 standard does not specify the cold flow requirements of diesel fuel. Instead, it suggests that the cloud point be no more than 6 °C higher than the 10th percentile minimum ambient temperature for the month the fuel will be used. The 10th percentile temperature corresponds to the minimum temperature that would be reached no more than 3 days out of 30 for the month (decile). The ASTM D 975 contains overview maps that show the expected tenth percentile temperature for every month for each state.

Using these guidelines gas stations offer "winter ready diesel" for sale to the Motorist – there are two ways to achieve this:

- winter blend — the gas station has blended the No.2 diesel with No.1(kerosene) by some percentage.
- winterized diesel — the No.2 diesel has been treated with additives by the diesel supplier.

As the treatment with additives (1:40000) is a cheaper way to enhance No.2 fuel in winter, most stations offer winterized diesel in cold weather conditions. In regions with colder weather, most gas stations offer No.1 fuel at the same pump allowing drivers to decide for themselves on a winter blend.

== See also ==
- Dieselisation
