= Pennsylvania Railroad class Q2 =

American steam locomotive, 1944–1945

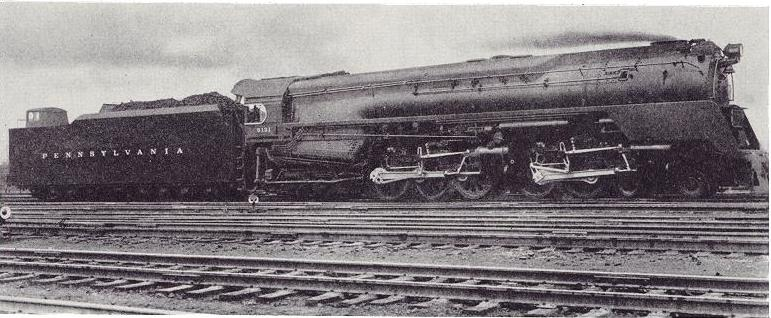
- PRR Q2 prototype #6131
Type and origin
- Power type: Steam
- Builder: Altoona Works
- Build date: 1944–45
- Total produced: 26
Specifications
- Configuration
  - Whyte: 4-4-6-4
  - UIC: 2'BC2'
- Gauge: 4 ft 8 1/2 in (1,435 mm) standard gauge
- Leading dia.: 36 in (0.914 m)
- Driver dia.: 69 in (1.753 m)
- Wheelbase: 26 ft 4.5 in (8.039 m) (driving); 20 ft 4 in (6.20 m) (rigid); 53 ft 5.5 in (16.294 m)
- Length: 124 ft 7.125 in (37.976 m) (locomotive and tender)
- Width: 11 ft 4 in (3.45 m) (storm windows open)
- Height: 16 ft 5.5 in (5.017 m)
- Adhesive weight: 393,000 lb (178,000 kg; 178 t)
- Loco weight: 619,100 lb (280,800 kg; 280.8 t)
- Tender weight: 430,000 lb (195,000 kg; 195 t)
- Total weight: 1,049,100 lb (475,900 kg; 475.9 t)
- Tender type: PRR class 180F84, 8 axles, with conductor "doghouse"
- Fuel type: Soft coal
- Fuel capacity: 39.86 short tons (36.16 t; 35.59 long tons)
- Water cap.: 19,020 US gal (72,000 L; 15,840 imp gal)
- Fuel consumption: 12.5 t (12.3 long tons; 13.8 short tons) of coal per hour 16,600 US gal (63,000 L; 13,800 imp gal) of water per hour
- Boiler: 106 in (2.692 m)
- Boiler pressure: 300 psi (2.1 MPa)
- Front cylinder: 19 3/4 in × 28 in (502 mm × 711 mm)
- Rear cylinder: 23 3/4 in × 29 in (603 mm × 737 mm)
- Valve gear: Walschaerts
Performance figures
- Power output: 7,987 hp (5,956 kW) (indicated)/ 6,645 hp (4,955 kW) (drawbar)
- Tractive effort: 100,816 lbf (448.45 kN) / 114,860 lbf (510.9 kN) (with booster)
- Factor of adh.: 3.9
Career
- Operators: Pennsylvania Railroad
- Numbers: 6131, 6175–6199
- Last run: 1951
- Disposition: All scrapped

The Pennsylvania Railroad's class Q2 comprised one prototype and twenty-five production duplex steam locomotives of 4-4-6-4 wheel arrangement built between 1944 and 1945.

They were the largest non-articulated locomotives ever built and the most powerful locomotives ever static tested, producing 7,987 cylinder horsepower (5,873 kW) on the PRR's static test plant. They were by far the most successful duplex type. The duplex propensity to slip was combated by an automatic slip control mechanism that reduced power to the slipping unit. However, it is frequently cited the slip control mechanism rarely functioned properly.

At 114860 lbf tractive effort (with booster), the Q2 locomotive was 78% more powerful than the PRR M1 and M1a, the previous standard fast freight locomotive on the railroad at the time, and the company claimed the Q2 could pull 125 freight cars at a speed of 50 mph (80 km/h). These were an improved version of the previous Q1 class, which was a 4-6-4-4 dual-purpose engine instead of a 4-4-6-4 fast freight engine.

The Q2 gets frequently compared against the PRR J1 2-10-4 class, which was built roughly around the same time, was also capable of pulling fast freight at 50 mph (80 km/h), and had a comparable 95,100 lbf (423 kN) of tractive effort. The J1 also used ten 69 in (1.753 m) drivers, and employed a booster engine for improved starting power. The J1 used significantly less fuel (coal and water) per ton-mile, all while traveling at similar speeds, and were far more reliable engines, earning their reputation as dependable workhorses. Ultimately, the Q2 did not present any performance improvement over the J1 2-10-4’s in 50 mph freight service, but they cost more to operate and used more coal and water.

The Q2 was plagued not only with poor fuel efficiency, but also suffered long periods out of service, and high maintenance costs. At one time Jack Francis the Master Mechanic at Conway complained he had 25 of the 26 Q2’s out of service at once.

Despite its power, the Q2s were all out of service by 1951, less than 6 years since it was built. With dieselization, they were among first for withdrawal since they were slightly more capable than the J1 class 2-10-4s under the PRR's 50 mile-an-hour freight train speed limit, but with far-higher operating and maintenance costs. The final Q2, 6199, had a power output of 7,987 hp (5,956 kW).
