= 4464 =

4464 may refer to:

- 4-4-6-4, a Whyte notation classification of steam locomotive
- 4464 Vulcano, a minor planet
