= 4644 =

4644 may refer to:

- 4-6-4-4, a Whyte notation classification of steam locomotive
- 4644 Oumu, a minor planet
