= Pennsylvania Railroad class Q1 =

Experimental steam locomotive

Pennsylvania Railroad class Q1 #6130
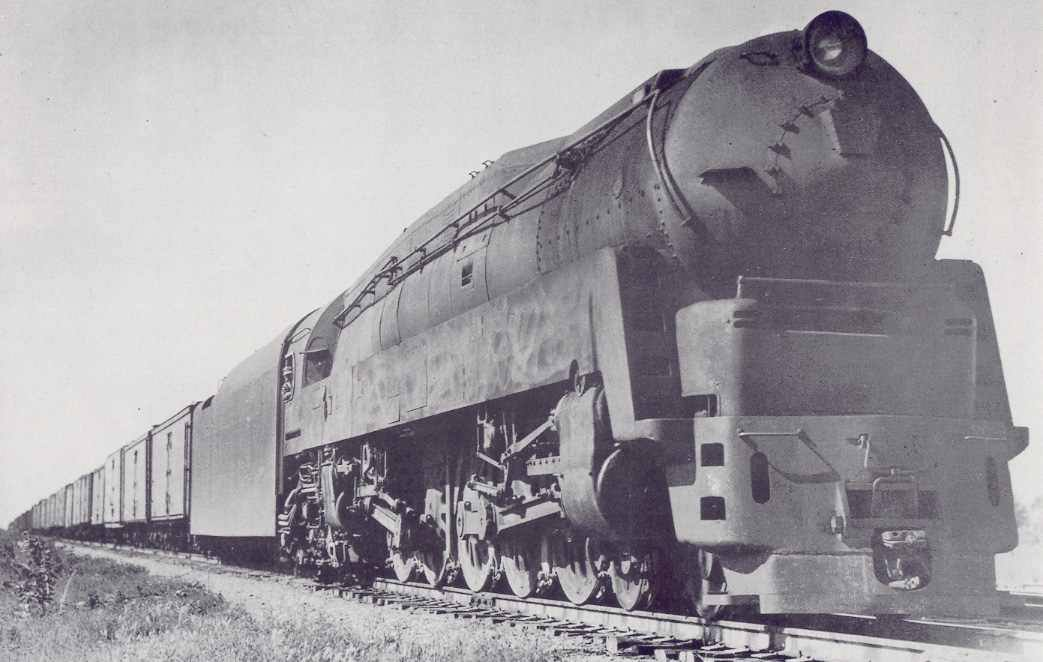
Type and origin
- Power type: Steam
- Builder: Pennsylvania Railroad's Altoona shops
- Serial number: 4383
- Build date: 1942
- Total produced: 1
Specifications
- Configuration
  - Whyte: 4-6-4-4
- Gauge: 4 ft 8 1/2 in (1,435 mm) standard gauge
- Leading dia.: 36 in (914 mm)
- Driver dia.: 77 in (1,956 mm)
- Trailing dia.: 1st wheel: 45 in (1,143 mm), 2nd wheel: 50 in (1,270 mm)
- Wheelbase: Coupled: 26.83 ft 6 in (8.33 m), Loco: 54.83 ft 4 in (16.81 m), Loco & tender: 103.83 ft 9 1/4 in (31.88 m)
- Length: 122 ft 9 3/4 in (37.433 m)
- Adhesive weight: 354,700 lb (160,890 kg); 1st driver: 73,700 lb (33,430 kilograms; 33 tonnes), 2nd driver: 72,100 lb (32,704 kilograms; 33 tonnes), 3rd driver: 70,200 lb (31,842 kilograms; 32 tonnes), 4th driver: 68,800 lb (31,207 kilograms; 31 tonnes), 5th driver: 69,900 lb (31,706 kilograms; 32 tonnes)
- Total weight: 1,027,870 lb (466,230 kg)
- Fuel type: Soft coal
- Fuel capacity: 82,640 lb (37,485 kg)
- Water cap.: 19,167 US gal (72,550 L; 15,960 imp gal)
- Boiler pressure: 300 psi (2.1 MPa)
- Heating surface
  - Firebox: 580 sq ft (53.9 m^{2})
  - Total surface: 7,808 sq ft (725.4 m^{2})
- Superheater
  - Heating area: 2,290 sq ft (212.7 m^{2})
- Cylinders: 4
- Front cylinder: 23 in × 28 in (584 mm × 711 mm)
- Rear cylinder: 19 1/2 in × 26 in (495 mm × 660 mm)
- Valve gear: Walschaerts
Performance figures
- Maximum speed: At least 70 mph (113 km/h)
- Power output: 6,000 hp (4,500 kW)
- Tractive effort: Locomotive: 81,793 lbf (363.83 kN); Booster: 11,250 lbf (50.04 kN); Total: 93,043 lbf (413.88 kN)
- Factor of adh.: 4.34
Career
- Operators: Pennsylvania Railroad
- Numbers: 6130
- Disposition: Withdrawn 1949, scrapped 1952

The Pennsylvania Railroad class Q1, #6130, was a single experimental steam locomotive designed for dual service. The locomotive entered service in 1942, and retired in 1949 after accumulating a relatively low 165,000 service miles.

The Q1 had a 4-6-4-4 wheel arrangement, consisting of a four-wheel leading truck, two sets of driving wheels (six and four) in a rigid locomotive frame, and a four-wheel trailing truck. The first group of six driving wheels were powered by a pair of conventional front-mounted cylinders, while the rear four driving wheels had their cylinders mounted behind them, on either side of the firebox. The driving wheels were 77 in (1,956 mm), larger than the PRR's existing dual-service locomotives.

The Q1's streamlined design consisted of a blunt nosecone in front of the smokebox, extended side skirts covering the locomotive's pipework, and a streamlined shape on the tender similar to the PRR's S1, S2, and T1 passenger locomotives. The cab front was set at a rakish angle. While the overall design reduced drag compared to the PRR's existing J1 class, the streamlining was ultimately removed around 1945, due to the minimal benefits at low freight speeds, and increased maintenance costs.

The Q1 was ultimately considered a failure by both PRR and later rail historians. Between design shortcomings and high operational costs, particularly during increasing use of diesel locomotives, it was never approved for series production. Despite being designed as a dual-service locomotive, minimal evidence suggests it ever served in a passenger capacity. However, its design did inspire the moderately successful albeit short-lived PRR class Q2.

== History ==
The PRR's Board approved $595,000 (equal to $13,673,694 today) for the Q1's construction on Oct. 9, 1940 which was completed in March 1942. Its streamlined shrouding, according to an interview of John W. Epstein, Special Projects Manager and vice president, Raymond Loewy & Assoc., was designed by Raymond Loewy, but due to WWII there was no publicity about it. The Q1 was a duplex locomotive with a 4-6-4-4 wheel arrangement consisting of a four-wheel leading truck, two sets of driving wheels (six followed by four) in a rigid locomotive frame and a four-wheel trailing truck. The first group of six driving wheels was driven by cylinders mounted conventionally in front of them, while the rear four wheels had cylinders mounted behind them next to the firebox. As a locomotive designed for dual service like PRR M1s, its drivers were 77 in (1,956 mm) in diameter.

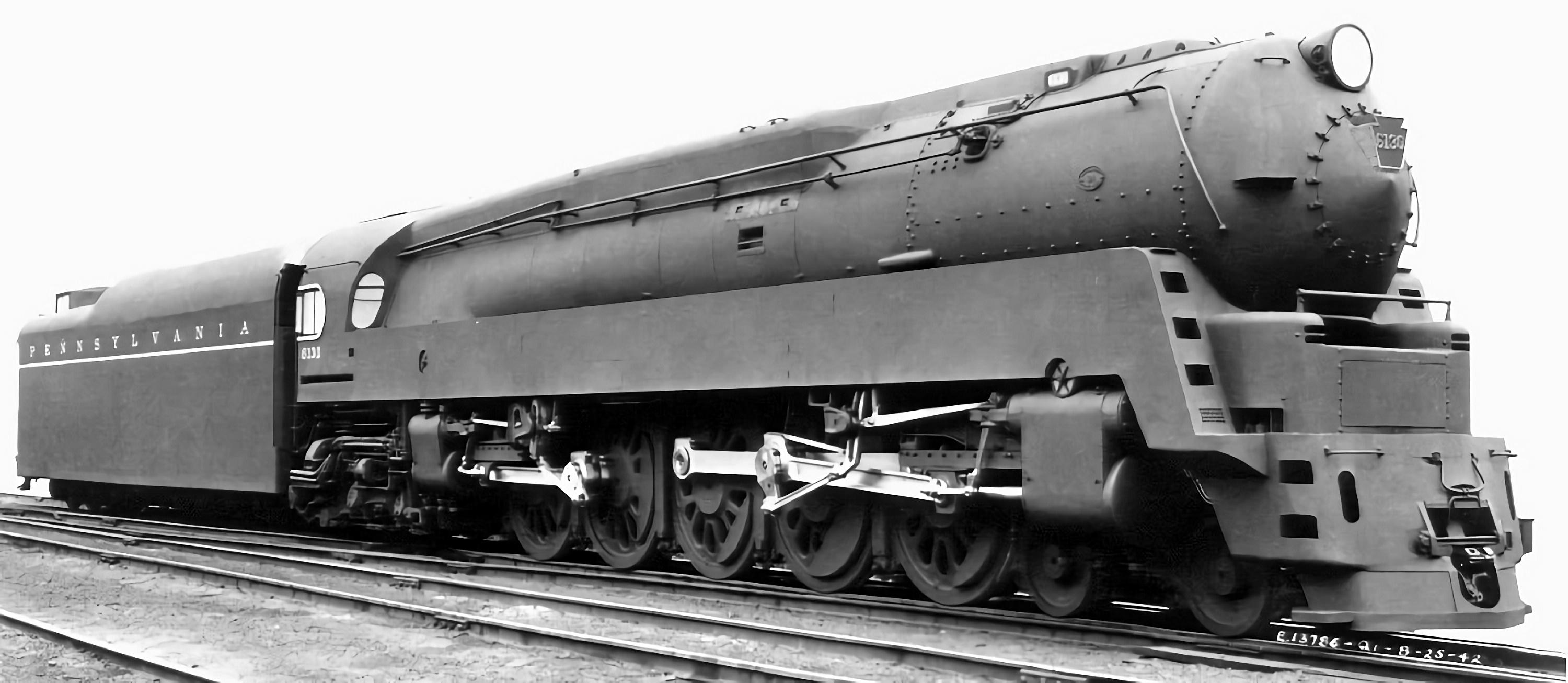
Three quarters view of the Q1.

The Q1 seen from a similar angle, but with most of its streamlining gone. The intricate workings of the duplex drive are easy to see.

The Q1's streamlining was in the form of a bluntly-pointed nosecone on the smokebox front as well as extended side skirts covering up the locomotive's pipework. The cab front was set at a rakish angle. The tender, although given a freight locomotive's "doghouse" on the rear deck for the head-end brakeman, was otherwise a streamlined affair very similar to that used on the S1, S2, and T1 passenger locomotives. Q1 was the last dual service locomotive designed by the Pennsylvania Railroad, but there is no substantial evidence showing that it was assigned to passenger service. Q1's design was able to reduce dynamic augment by 60% compared to the J1 class above 70 mph (110 km/h), but it exceeded the railroad's 50 mph (80 km/h) speed limit for the freight train.

On April 10, 1942, H.W. Jones, Chief of Motive Power, told Altoona that the Q1, #6130, would be considered a passenger engine as far as striping and lettering were concerned. During its short service life, it spent more time in shops or the engine-house than being run, accumulating only about 165,000 service miles in its career (1942–1949). Its first revenue run occurred on May 31, 1942, from East Altoona to Enola with 125 cars and 10,000 tons; 40 mph (64 km/h) was made on a level track at 40% cutoff. In October 1943, it was assigned to the St. Clair Avenue Enginehouse in Columbus, Ohio and ran mostly in the Ohio area and to Chicago.

During the war, The Q1 was subjected to less speed restrictions, able to maintain 50 mph where other locomotives with ten driving wheels were restricted to 35 or 40 mph. The Q1 was also authorized for 70 mph east of Altoona. Such speeds were usually only granted to locomotives working passenger trains, though how often the Q1 attained such speeds is unclear.much of its lifetime mileage was achieved during the wartime, having run 100,000 miles in 37 months.

In December 1944, it appeared at a PRR exhibition in Chicago Union Station entitled "Presenting a Line of Modern Coal-Burning Steam Locomotives". At some time during the next year, it lost much of its streamlining, the nosecone being removed in favor of a conventional PRR smokebox front, including the keystone number plate placed centrally on the small smokebox door. A headlamp bracket mounted above that door also hung the locomotive's bell. The side skirting was cut back to expose pipework and fittings for easier maintenance. The skyline casing atop the boiler remained in place.

The Q1 remained in service until July 1949, after which it was placed in storage. It was dismantled around 1949 and was removed from the company's books in January 1952.

The PRR considered the Q1 design unfit for series production, and railroad historians consider it mostly a failure. The backward-driving rear cylinders were a poor choice; mounted next to the firebox, each constrained the other's size, and the firebox's heat and soot increased wear on the cylinders. These problems had previously been encountered on the B&O's N-1 duplex. The length of steam pipes required also meant a fair degree of power loss. Added to this, the passenger locomotive-sized drivers were a poor choice for freight service.

From its experiences with this locomotive, the PRR developed an improved design, the Q2. This had smaller drivers, cylinders mounted in front of the driving wheels, was built largely unstreamlined and designed for freight service only.

== Gallery ==
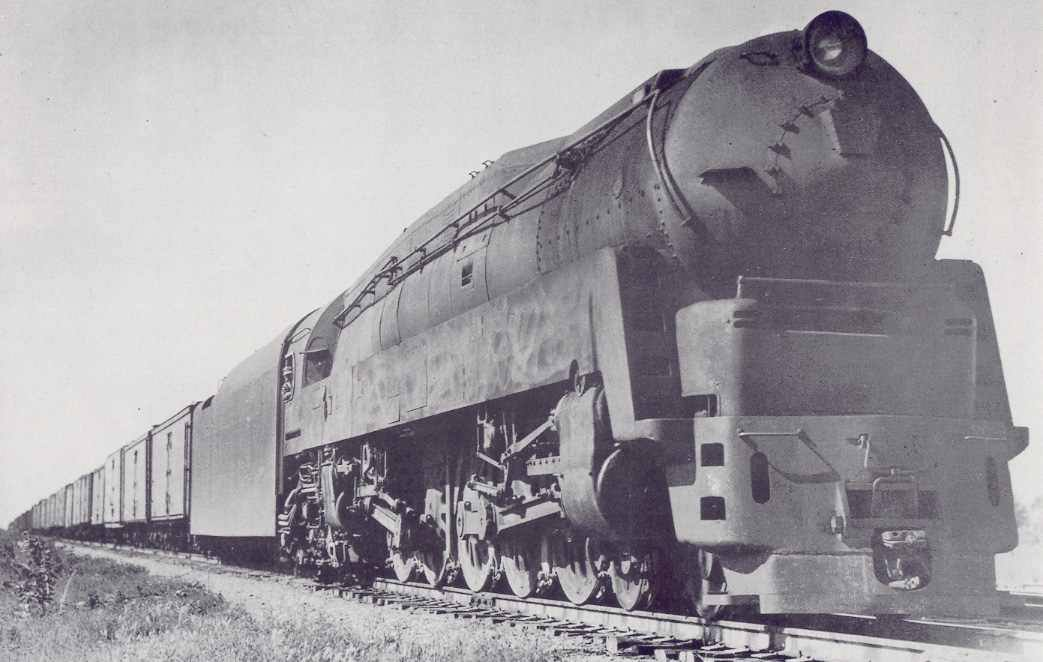
PRR Q1 6130 pulling a Freight Train

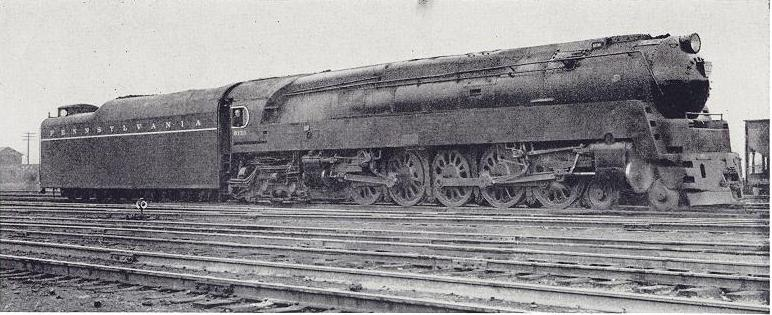
PRR Q1 6130 in Presenting a Line of Modern Coal-Burning Steam Locomotives
