= Gel point (petroleum) =

Chemical property of petroleum products

The gel point of petroleum products is the temperature at which the liquids gel so they no longer flow by gravity or can be pumped through fuel lines. This phenomenon happens when the petroleum product reaches a low enough temperature to precipitate interlinked paraffin wax crystals throughout the fluid.

More highly distilled petroleum products have fewer paraffins and will have a lower gel point. On the other hand, the gel point of crude oil is dependent upon the composition of the crude oil as some crude oils contain more or less components that dissolve the paraffins. In some cases the gel point of a crude oil may be correlated from the pour point.

The gel points of some common petroleum products are as follows:

- #1 diesel fuel: −9.2 °C (15.4 °F).
- #2 diesel fuel: −8.1 °C (17.4 °F).
- Heating oil: −8.9 °C (16.0 °F).
- Kerosene: −40.0 °C (−40.0 °F).

For the petroleum product to flow again, it needs to be brought above the gel point temperature to the ungel point, which is typically near its pour point. However, without stirring the paraffin waxes may still remain in crystal form so the fuel may have to be warmed further to its remix temperature to completely re-dissolve the waxes.

Anti-gel additives are sometimes added to petroleum products where cold temperature may affect their use. The additives act to reduce the formation of wax crystals in the product, thereby lowering the pour point and the gel point of the fuel. Anti-gel additives may not necessarily affect the cloud point.

== See also ==
- Cloud point
- Cold filter plugging point
- Petroleum
- Pour point
