= Biofuel in the United Kingdom =

The biofuel sector in the United Kingdom, under the auspices of the government's Renewable Transport Fuel Obligation (RTFO), has been progressing towards enhanced sustainable energy solutions. Marking a significant stride in this direction was the government's endorsement and introduction of E10 biofuel in late 2021. This fuel blend, consisting of 90% regular unleaded gasoline and 10% ethanol, was introduced as part of an initiative to reduce greenhouse gas emissions (GHG) from transport fuels. The introduction of E10 led to a shift in the renewable fuel landscape in the UK, particularly influencing an increase in the utilization of non-waste feedstocks. In the year 2022, the biofuel sector, as per government reports, achieved a reduction in GHG emissions by 82% in comparison to traditional fossil fuels.

== General ==
Biodiesel is rapidly becoming more common in a number of developed countries and the environmental effects of using biodiesel either as a blend such as B20 (20% biodiesel and 80% petrodiesel) or as a straight fuel stock may be different in various countries. This is because the allowable amounts of sulphur and other compounds vary from country to country. Additionally, the average temperature in a country will dictate the amount of biodiesel that can be blended into the fuel supply before the cold filter plugging point (the temperature at which the fluid will block a 45 μm filter) renders the fuel unusable. The national annex of BS EN 14214 specifies a maximum CFPP for B100 biodiesel of −15 °C in the winter (16 November - 15 March inclusive) and −5 °C for the rest of the year. As such, the benefits and disadvantages of biodiesel will vary from those in the United Kingdom.

== Environmental benefits ==
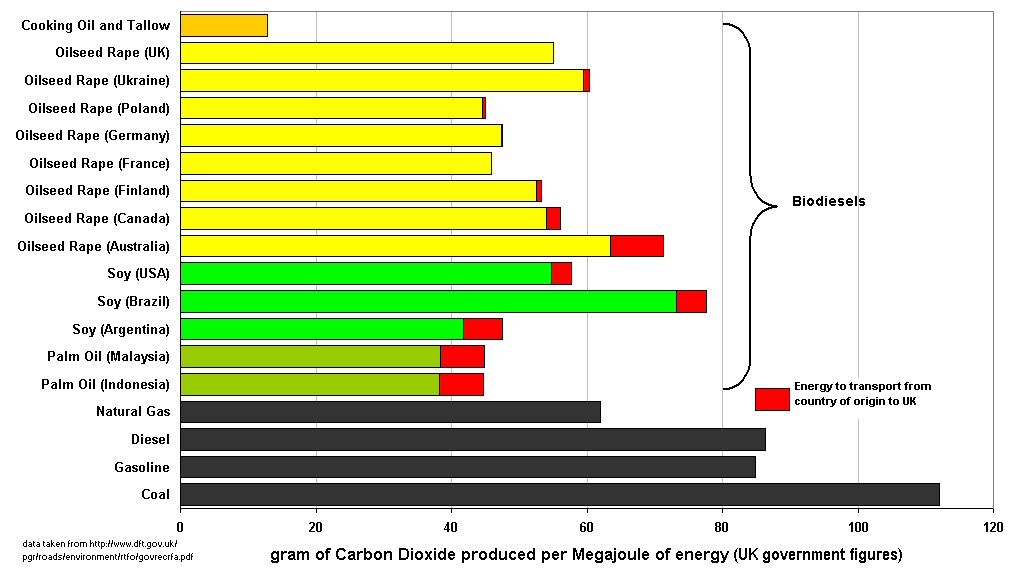
Graph of UK figures for the Carbon Intensity of Biodiesels and fossil fuels. It assumes biodiesel is transported to the UK to be burnt.

Making and burning biodiesel contributes to atmospheric carbon dioxide to a smaller extent than burning fossil fuels. The calculation of exactly how much carbon dioxide is produced is a complex and inexact process, and is highly dependent on the method by which the biofuel is produced. For example, including the emissions associated with land-use change (LUC) substantially increases the carbon cost of biodiesel. The graph on the right shows the figures calculated by the UK Government for the Renewable transport fuel obligation.

== Taxation ==
In the UK, drivers using SVO/PPO have in the past been prosecuted for failure to pay duty to Her Majesty's Revenue and Customs. The rate of taxation on SVO was originally set at a reduced rate of 27.1p per litre, but in late 2005, HMRC started to enforce the full diesel excise rate of 47.2p per litre.

HMRC argued that SVOs/PPOs on the market from small producers did not meet the official definition of "biodiesel" in Section 2AA of The Hydrocarbon Oil Duties Act 1979 (HODA), and consequently was merely a "fuel substitute" chargeable at the normal diesel rate. Such a policy seemed to contradict the UK Government's commitments to the Kyoto Protocol and to many EU directives and had many consequences, including an attempt to make the increase retroactive, with one organization being presented with a £16,000 back tax bill. This change in the rate of excise duty effectively removed any commercial incentive to use SVO/PPO, regardless of its desirability on environmental grounds; unless waste vegetable oil can be obtained free of charge, the combined price of SVO/PPO and taxation for its use usually exceeded the price of mineral diesel. HMRC's interpretation is widely challenged by the SVO/PPO industry and the UK pure Plant Oil Association (UKPPOA) was formed to represent the interests of people using vegetable oil as fuel and to lobby parliament.

Following a review in late 2006, HM Revenue & Customs has announced changes regarding the administration and collection of excise duty of biofuels and other fuel substitutes (Veg Oil). The changes came into effect on 30 June 2007. There is no longer a requirement to register to pay duty on vegetable oil used as road fuel for those who "produce" or use less than 2,500 litres per year. For those producing over this threshold the biodiesel rate now applies. From 1 June 2014 Production or Usage of Any Biofuel (inc SVO, Bio-Diesel etc.), Substitute or Additive is limited to 2500 litres. You must be registered to use or produce greater than 2500 L of Biofuel, Substitutes or Additives. Records must be kept for all production volumes and methodology regardless of quantities produced.

== See also ==
- Biodiesel
- Biodiesel by region
- Vegetable oil economy
- Low-carbon economy
- Energy crop
- Energy law
- Energy security
- Renewable energy by country
