= Dieselisation =

Conversion to diesel fuel in vehicles, especially locomotives

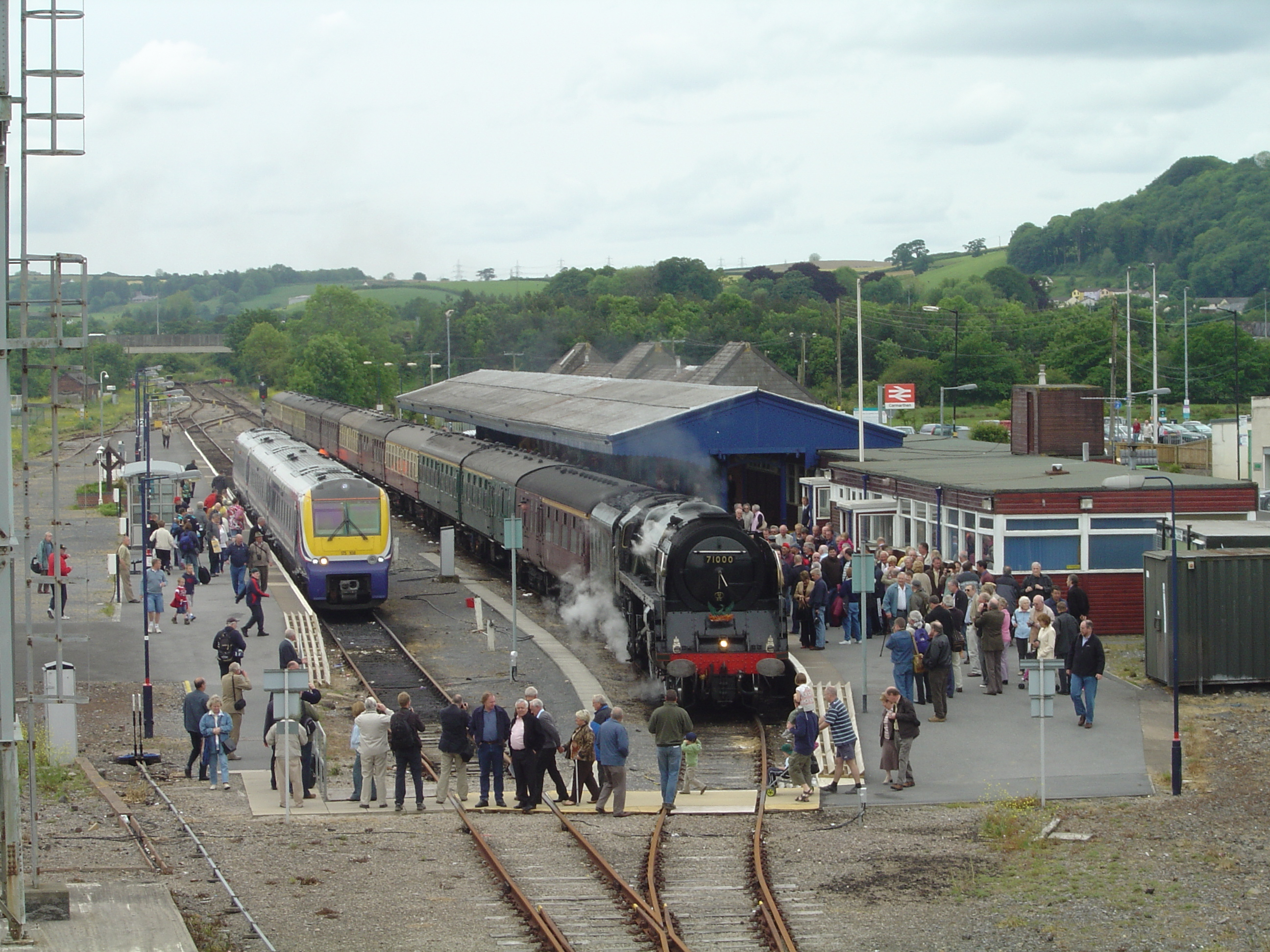
Modern diesel multiple unit next to a steam locomotive at Carmarthen railway station in 2007

Dieselisation (US: dieselization) is the process of equipping vehicles with a diesel engine or diesel engines.

It can involve replacing an internal combustion engine powered by petrol (US: gasoline) fuel with an engine powered by diesel fuel, as occurred on a large scale with trucks, buses, farm tractors, trains, and building construction machinery after World War II. Alternatively it can involve replacing the entire plant or vehicle with one that is diesel-powered; the term commonly describes the generational replacement between the 1930s to 1970s of railway steam locomotives with diesel locomotives, and associated facilities.

== Water transport ==
The two-stroke diesel engine for marine applications was introduced in 1908 and remains in use today. It is the most efficient prime mover to date, models such as the Wärtsilä-Sulzer RTA96-C offer a thermal efficiency of 50% and over 100,000 horsepower. First steps towards conversions using diesel engines as means of propulsion (on smaller ships) were already undertaken by the 1920s. The market share of steam-powered ships ("steam ships") peaked around 1925 (a few sailing ships remained in service). By the early 1950s diesel engine-powered "motor ships" held over 50% of the market.

== Rail transport ==
In rail transport, dieselisation refers to the replacement of the steam locomotive or electric locomotive with the diesel locomotive (usually the diesel-electric locomotive), a process which began in the 1930s and is now substantially complete around the world.

=== Advantages of diesel in rail transport ===
Weighing against the cost of, and inertia against, replacing the large investment that railways had in existing steam power were the dramatic increases in flexibility and efficiency with diesel. Diesels could and did have a significantly higher initial price per unit-horsepower delivered; however, their operating and support costs were much lower and unit availability between inspection repair and maintenance stops were much higher. Diesels also had fueling requirements fulfilled by tank cars on sidings, in contrast to the more frequent and complex fueling and watering infrastructure required for steam engines. Also, diesels use much less fuel and no manpower when idling, something steam locomotives often do. Diesels can be parked running for days unattended, whereas steam engines must be constantly tended to if not completely shut down. Bringing a steam engine boiler up to operating temperature is often regarded as both an art and science, requiring much training and experience. A diesel is much simpler to start and shut down. Diesels simply required significantly less time and labor to operate and maintain.

Diesels also had advantages in service flexibility. They are more scalable to power requirements, owing to the control systems that allowed multiple units to be controlled by one operator. "Double header" steam power required a crew for each locomotive. The range of efficient operation for diesels under different speeds and grades is much greater than with steam locomotives, which tended to be purpose-built for specific situations. A high speed Hudson steam locomotive is good for only one situation, high speeds on level grades.

Initially, diesel locomotives were less powerful than the typical steam locomotives. Between the late 1930s and the late 1950s the power available with diesel locomotive engines roughly doubled, although the most powerful steam locomotives ever built still exceeded the power of the most powerful diesel locomotives from the late twentieth century.

Dieselization could be accomplished without any major changes to rail infrastructure, presenting lower initial capital costs than electrification. However, in situations where volume is sufficient to amortize the capital costs of electrification, the greater efficiency and speed available with electrification are significant advantages and electrified systems are favored throughout most of the developed world, with the most salient exceptions being North America, the British Isles, and Australia.

=== Timeline by geographic region ===
==== Europe ====
Relatively short trackage between destinations and high traffic volumes in Europe favoured electrification to replace steam. Due to shortage of oil in Europe outside of former oil industry in Romania, Dieselisation mainly took part in high speed passenger service with Diesel multiple units like the record-setting Fliegender Hamburger of the 1930s and later the Trans Europ Express which simplified cross-border services.

Most main lines are electrified, though most of the secondary lines and switching service is unelectrified. Around 50% of the European railway network is electrified and 80% of traffic runs on these lines. Most countries used diesels as an interim solution during postwar reconstruction, when oil became cheaper than coal in most Western countries, and electrification. Two countries, Switzerland and Luxembourg, have electrified their whole network. Over 70% of the entire network is electrified in Belgium (87%), Sweden (75%), the Netherlands (74%), Bulgaria (74%), Italy (72%), Austria (71%), and Portugal (71%). The most powerful electric locomotives in western Europe pull Swedish ore trains.

In Britain the Great Western Railway introduced diesel railcars in the 1930s and the first British mainline diesel locomotive was built by the London, Midland and Scottish Railway in 1947, but unlike elsewhere in the developed world, the transition away from steam was delayed during the early postwar years. The delay was driven by two economic considerations: the lower initial cost of steam locomotives for immediate replacement of the large number of locomotives worn out from wartime service, and a projected rise in the cost of petroleum relative to coal, a plentiful domestic resource. In reality, UK coal production peaked in 1913, and again in 1952, with mines getting closed and oil getting cheaper. Nationalisation of the railways took place in 1948; diesel locomotives were first introduced on a wide scale following the Modernisation Plan of 1955. Poor reliability among the first diesel locomotives used in the Modernisation Plan caused it to be implemented at a slower pace while the problems with the locomotives were worked out during the second half of the 1950s.

The last steam locomotive for British Railways was built in 1960 and named "Evening Star" (number 92220). Steam traction was withdrawn on British Railways in 1968 and largely replaced with diesel traction (with electrification on a minority of lines). Steam was finally eliminated on Northern Ireland Railways in 1970 and entirely replaced with diesel.

Steam continued on the London Underground until 1971, as London Transport considered steam to be cheaper than diesel shunters. After 1971, diesel hydraulics and battery electrics took over shunting duties on the Underground. Steam continued on many industrial railways in the UK mainly with the National Coal Board and British Steel Corporation until the 1980s.

Ireland chose dieselisation over electrification and as of 2015, the railways in Ireland (with the exception of the electrified Dublin Area Rapid Transit) remain entirely diesel operated.

==== North America ====
The small initial market for diesels was created by the State of New York's Kaufman Act of 1923, which prohibited operating steam locomotives in New York City and adjacent towns. Mainline passenger railroads in New York had already been electrified, or their electrification had been planned regardless of the Kaufman Act. Electrification of numerous freight yards was uneconomical, and railroads turned to diesels. The first ALCO boxcab switcher was put in operation in 1925 by Central Railroad of New Jersey at its 138th Street waterfront terminal in The Bronx. The second was delivered in the same year to Baltimore and Ohio Railroad's yards on Manhattan. Both worked into the late 1950s and survive in museums to date. The advantages of diesel-electric switch engines gained them a widespread market during the 1930s.

Dieselization got a boost from three developments of the early 1930s: the development by General Motors and its Winton Engine Corporation subsidiary of diesel engines with vastly improved power-to-weight ratios and output flexibility; the desire of railways to find more cost-efficient locomotion for passenger service at the height of the Great Depression; and design innovations in rail equipment that reduced weight, making the contemporary diesel engines, which were low-powered by today's standards, viable for mainline passenger service. The mid-1930s saw the introduction of lightweight diesel-powered streamlined trainsets such as the Burlington Route's Zephyrs and Union Pacific's M-1000x "City" trains. During the second half of the decade, diesel locomotives with sufficient power for full-size passenger trains were developed and put into regular production. Improved GM diesel engines in 1938 increased power and reliability. GM's sales contracts included training, financing, and maintenance from GM to lower the hurdles in converting from steam to diesel. Dieselization of passenger service gained momentum as the decade drew to a close and the first model of mainline diesel freight locomotive was on the market in 1940. Dieselization was especially attractive to western railroads, for whom the watering requirements of steam locomotives were a problem in vast stretches of the western interior. Coal-country railroads were generally reluctant to embrace diesel, a competitor to one of their main hauling markets, well into the 1940s.

Competition from diesel spurred a round of development in steam locomotive technology. High style, high speed "steamliners" produced during the second half of the 1930s became the speed kings of passenger service. Duplex and articulated steam locomotives built in the early 1940s exceeded the power of any diesel ever built, although their power was edged by gas turbine-electric locomotives during the 1950s. Mechanical coal stokers, in use since the 1920s, and use of bunker oil as an alternative fuel, facilitated the practical use of steam for the highest power requirements. But the limits of steam technology were rapidly being reached. The new locomotives were mechanically complex and extremely specialized. Locomotive size became an issue, as steam engines became so big in the 1940s that the cylinder and boiler dimensions were pushing the limits that the loading gauge would allow. The fuel and water requirements of high-powered steam locomotives became an issue. Steam turbine-electric locomotive power was developed in 1938 by General Electric. GE abandoned the project in 1943 after unsatisfactory results during trials with three railroads and subsequent efforts by Baldwin Locomotive Works with steam turbine-electric locomotion during the late 1940s and early 1950s were similarly unsuccessful.

US entry into World War II interrupted dieselization. The US Navy gained priority for diesel engines, curtailing their availability for railway use. No production of passenger locomotives was permitted by the War Production Board between September 1942 and February 1945. The petroleum crisis of 1942–43 made coal-fired steam more attractive, especially near the east coast. After the peak of the petroleum crisis and as wartime production of diesel engines hit its stride, increasing production of freight diesel locomotives was permitted. By the war's end, pent-up demand to replace dated and worn-out railway equipment was overwhelming.

The market share of steam locomotives dropped from 30% in 1945 to 2% in 1948. The drop was most precipitous in passenger service, where modernization of equipment was imperative for image and cost reasons as railroads faced increasingly stiff competition from airplanes and the automobile. Norfolk and Western continued to champion steam, running steam passenger locomotives until 1959 and acquiring the last American steam locomotives built, a piston locomotive built in their own shop in 1953 and a steam turbine-electric locomotive built by Baldwin Locomotive Works in 1954.

Due to the advantages of diesel locomotives, railroads in North America had retired 90% of their steam locomotives by the mid-1950s. Also, major cities and their railyards became unhappy neighbors in post-war America. People were no longer content to endure the large amounts of soot and smoke that coal burning steam engines produced. Early diesels, while dirty by today's standards, were a gigantic improvement in air pollution over steam.

Steam engines lasted well into the late 1950s on major American railroads, and in isolated cases into the middle 1960s on small common carrier roads. The last steam locomotive fleet in everyday use (i.e. not a restored fleet) was retired in the late 1970s. Now they are only found in historical and sightseeing roles, where the steam engine is often a major draw, especially to museums or tourist railroads trying to recreate a historic atmosphere.

==== Soviet Union – Russia ====
Soviet leadership in the 1920s and 1930s had originally envisioned railway electrification as a key component of their industrialization, but by World War II only a small portion of their rail lines were electrified. Their project faced many challenges, including the high initial costs of electrification relative to traffic volume on long rail lines, high resource costs of early Soviet electrical power generation, and the urgent need to repair wartime damage to rail and power systems throughout eastern Europe. In the mid-1950s the Soviet Union embarked upon a hybrid dieselization/electrification program, with electrification concentrated on shorter lines. Both dieselization and electrification proceeded slowly; the last steam locomotives retired in 1975. At that time about 48% of freight tonnage was hauled by diesel locomotives. In 1990, about 30% of passenger traffic and 37% of freight tonnage was hauled by diesel. Post-Soviet electrification was slowed by the economic collapse of the 1990s. Electrification was completed on the Trans-Siberian Railway in 2002 and on the Kirov Railway to Murmansk in 2005. Since 2008, diesel-hauled freight tonnage has been less than 15% of the total freight tonnage.

==== Asia ====
===== Japan =====
The majority of Japan's rail network had been electrified in the post-war years. In spite of this, more desolate railway lines, particularly on the northern island of Hokkaido continued to use surplus steam locomotives well into the mid-1970s. This was due to the limits and problems created by the then-nationalized rail network, Japanese National Railways (JNR). Japan also has large coal deposits as a natural resource. By 1970, most, if not all steam locomotives had been relegated to freight work, and by the time that complete dieselisation occurred, the remaining steam locomotives were used for branch line work and shunting duties and later were put out of use completely.

===== India =====
Diesel and electric locomotives started slowly replacing steam in 1950s. The last 5 ft 6 in (1,676 mm) broad gauge steam locomotive built by CLW was a WG class locomotive named Antim Sitara (The last star), #10560, built in June 1970. The last meter gauge steam locomotive was a YG class built in 1972. Steam was largely replaced in the 1980s. The last scheduled steam operation was on 6 December 1995 on broad gauge. Last steam operation on narrow/meter gauge ended in 1999.

Two heritage lines, the Darjeeling Himalayan railway and the Nilgiri mountain railway have retained steam service.

===== China =====
China had produced diesel-hydraulic and diesel-electric locomotives on an experimental and limited production basis since 1958 but dieselization did not start in earnest until 1985, when production was increased on a standardized DF4 model locomotive. Mainline steam locomotives were produced until 1988 and industrial steam locomotives were produced until 1999, the last commercial steam locomotives produced in the world. The last mainline service with steam ended in 2005, but steam locomotives remain in limited use and production as of 2022, primarily in service with coal mines. Since the 1990s, China has emphasized electrification; as of 2004, 18,900 km of China's 74,200 km rail system were electrified. Planning for China's high speed rail system began during the 1990s.

===== Philippines =====
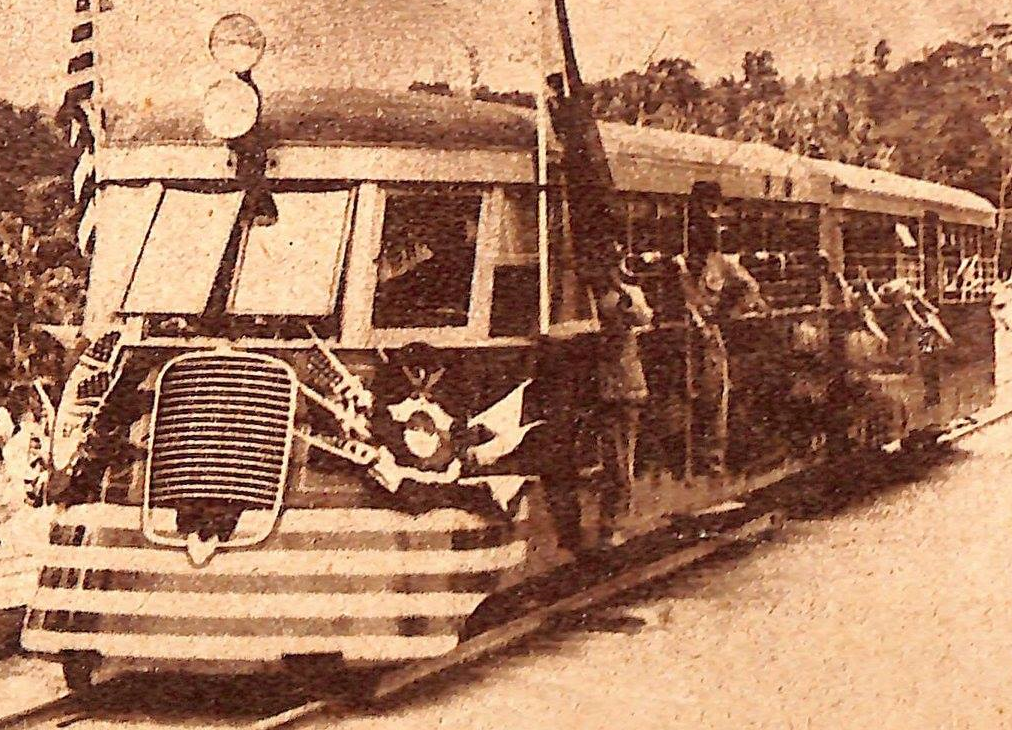
The first trains assembled in the Philippines, the MC class of 1932 pioneered the use of gasoline and diesel fuel in the country.

The state-owned Manila Railroad Company (MRR) began its experimentation with gasoline and diesel fuel in the 1930s. The first to be installed with diesel power were the MC class railcars that entered service in 1932. These streamlined railmotors were fitted with 96-horsepower Cummins engines. A set managed to survive with the Philippine National Railways until the 1980s.

By 1954, MRR general manager Salvador Villa ordered the dieselisation of the MRR network. General Electric provided diesel-electric locomotives while a Japanese consortium led by Daiichi Bussan Kaisha provided the JMC class diesel multiple units. The JMC class entered service in 1955 while the GE-built diesel locomotives entered service in 1956. On August 15, 1956, the MRR's steam locomotives ended their last regular services in Luzon. Contemporary efforts towards electrification has started in the 1990s, with the North–South Commuter Railway being its latest incarnation.

While steam power largely left passenger service by the late 1950s, several plantations in Luzon and Visayas continued to operate steam locomotives. As of 2020, at least one sugar mill in Negros Island still operates a steam locomotive fleet.

== Road transport ==
=== Europe ===
In terms of road transport, diesel gained popularity first with commercial hauliers, throughout the later 20th century, and then with passenger car users, particularly from the 1970s onwards, once diesel engines became more refined and also more readily available in passenger cars. Diesel had by this point long been a popular choice for taxi operators and agricultural users.

Peugeot and Mercedes-Benz (since the 1936 Mercedes-Benz 260 D) in particular developed reputations for passenger-car diesel engines, whilst VM Motori developed some significant motors for four-wheel drive vehicles.

In London the famed "hackney carriage" taxi had long been powered by a diesel engine. The high reliability, ease of driveability and high fuel efficiency of such an engine allows the taxis to carry many people for a lower cost than might otherwise be incurred through the use of conventional petrol engines. However, from 2018 onwards, all new examples are battery-electric.

=== United States ===
Lightweight diesel engines suited for road vehicles were introduced in the late 1930s. They were soon used in bus coaches, heavy trucks, tractors, and construction equipment. The postwar era saw rapid replacement of gasoline with diesel for heavy trucks and buses, with engines provided mostly by Cummins and Detroit Diesel, and some by Buda Engine Co. (later a division of Allis-Chalmers). Rising gasoline prices during the 1970s spurred interest in diesel for passenger cars, although it soon faded in popularity for private vehicles other than pickup trucks.

== See also ==
- Aircraft diesel engine

=== Alternative fuels ===
- Advanced steam technology
- Electric vehicle
- Hybrid vehicle

=== Energy policy and politics ===
- Efficient energy use
- Energy policy
- Suez Crisis

=== Diesel fuel ===
- Winter diesel fuel

== Bibliography ==
- Drury, George (2015). Guide to North American Steam Locomotives, Revised Edition (2nd ed.). Kalmbach Publishing. ISBN 978-1627002592.
- Marx, Thomas G. (1976), "Technological Change and the Theory of the Firm: The American Locomotive Industry, 1920–1955", Business History Review, 50 (1): 5–18, doi:10.2307/3113572, JSTOR 3113572, S2CID 154642921.
