= 4-6-4-4 =

Duplex locomotive wheel arrangement

4-6-4-4 wheel arrangement

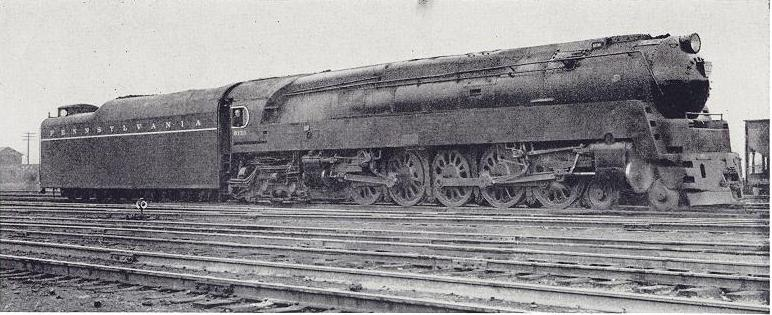
The PRR Q1 6130 - the only locomotive with this wheel arrangement

In Whyte notation, a 4-6-4-4 is a railroad steam locomotive that has four leading wheels followed by six coupled driving wheels, a second set of four driving wheels and four trailing wheels.

Other equivalent classifications are:

- UIC classification (also known as German or Italian classification): 2CB2
- French classification: 2322
- Turkish classification: 3524
- Swiss classification: 3/5+2/4 up to the early 1920s, later 5/9

The sole example of this arrangement was the PRR Q1. This locomotive was essentially a prototype in the development of the PRR Q2, a 4-4-6-4.
