= Cold filter plugging point =

Physical quantity

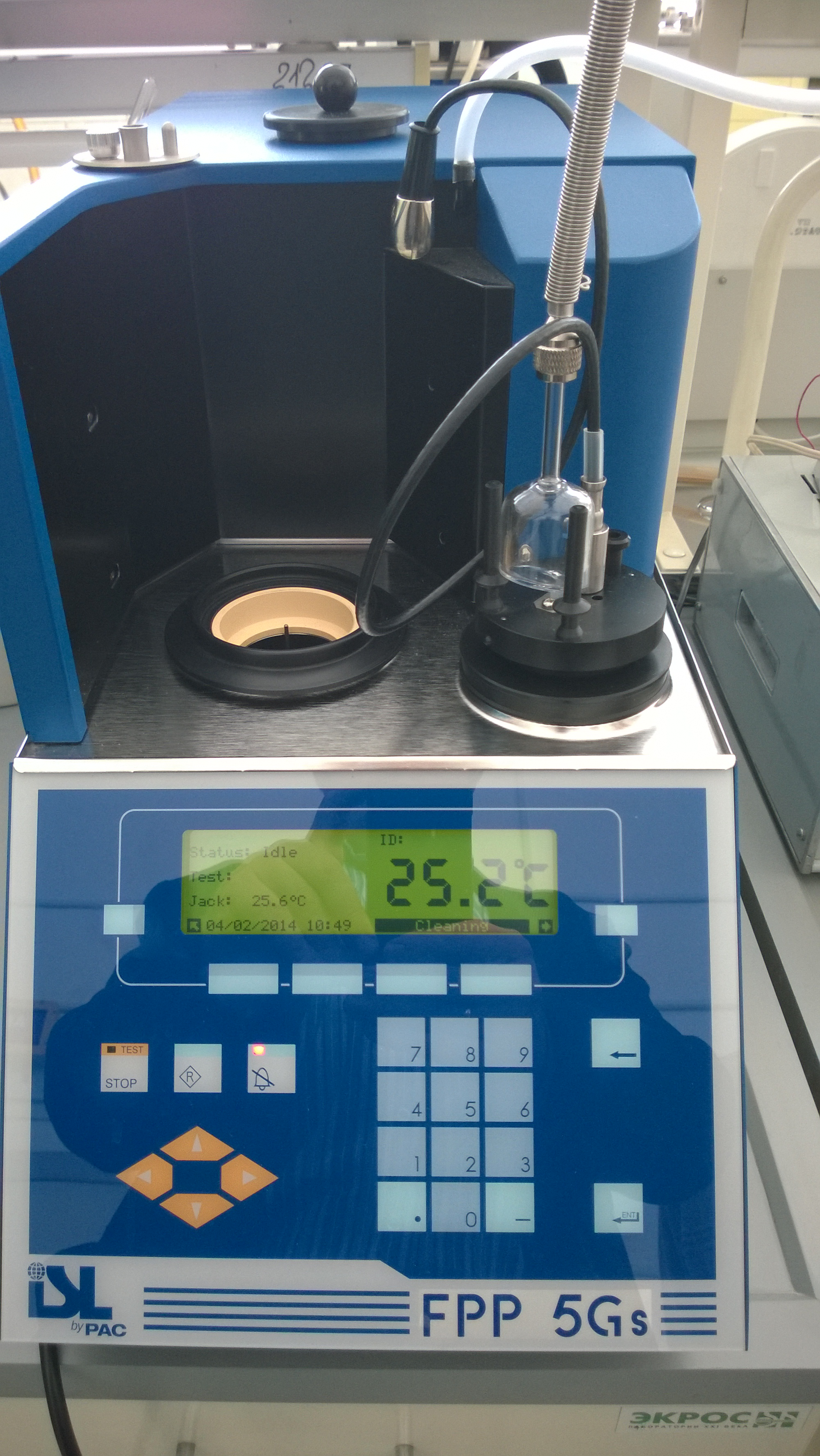
Automatic device for measuring the maximum filterability temperature ISL FPP 5Gs with a built-in cryostat.

Cold filter plugging point (CFPP) is the lowest temperature, expressed in degrees Celsius (°C), at which a given volume of diesel type of fuel still passes through a standardized filtration device in a specified time when cooled under certain conditions. This test gives an estimate for the lowest temperature that a fuel will give trouble free flow in certain fuel systems. This is important as in cold temperate countries, a high cold filter plugging point will clog up vehicle engines more easily.

The test is important in relation to the use of additives that allow spreading the usage of winter diesel at temperatures below the cloud point. The tests according to EN 590 show that a cloud point of +1 °C can have a CFPP −10 °C. Current additives allow a CFPP of −20 °C to be based on diesel fuel with a cloud point of −7 °C.

The trustworthiness of the EN 590 have been criticized as being too low for modern diesel motors – the German ADAC has run a test series on customary winter diesel in a cold chamber. All diesel brands did exceed the legal minimum by 3 to 11 degrees in the laboratory according to the legal DIN test. One of the real diesel motors however stopped working even before the legal minimum was reached, presumably due to an undersized filter heater. Notably the experiments did not show a direct correlation between the CFPP value of the mineral oil and the cold start capability of the diesel motors – hence the automobile club suggest the creation of a new test standard.

== Test method ==
The ASTM number for the test method to define cold filter plugging point is ASTM D6371.

== See also ==
- Cloud point
- Petroleum
- Pour point
