= Cloud point =

Temperature point in liquids

In liquids, the cloud point is the temperature below which a transparent solution undergoes either a liquid–liquid phase separation to form an emulsion or a liquid–solid phase transition to form either a stable sol or a suspension that settles as precipitate. The cloud point is analogous to the dew point at which a gas–liquid phase transition called condensation occurs in water vapour (humid air) to form liquid water (dew or clouds). When the temperature is below 0 °C, the dew point is called the frost point, as water vapour undergoes gas–solid phase transition called deposition, solidification, or freezing.

In the petroleum industry, cloud point refers to the temperature below which paraffin wax in diesel or biowax in biodiesels forms a cloudy appearance. The presence of solidified waxes thickens the oil and clogs fuel filters and injectors in engines. The wax also accumulates on cold surfaces (producing, for example, pipeline or heat exchanger fouling) and forms an emulsion or sol with water. Therefore, cloud point indicates the tendency of the oil to plug filters or small orifices at cold operating temperatures.

An everyday example of cloud point can be seen in olive oil stored in cold weather. Olive oil begins to solidify (via liquid–solid phase separation) at around 4 °C, whereas winter temperatures in temperate countries can often be colder than 0 °C. In these conditions, olive oil begins to develop white, waxy clumps/spheres of solidified oil that sink to the bottom of the container.

In crude or heavy oils, cloud point is synonymous with wax appearance temperature (WAT) and wax precipitation temperature (WPT).

The cloud point of a nonionic surfactant or glycol solution is the temperature at which the mixture starts to phase-separate, and two phases appear, thus becoming cloudy. This behavior is characteristic of non-ionic surfactants containing polyoxyethylene chains, which exhibit reverse solubility versus temperature behavior in water and therefore "cloud out" at some point as the temperature is raised. Glycols demonstrating this behavior are known as "cloud-point glycols" and are used as shale inhibitors. The cloud point is affected by salinity, being generally lower in more saline fluids.

Phase transitions of matter
To From	Solid	Liquid	Gas	Plasma
Solid		Melting	Sublimation	
Liquid	Freezing		Vaporization	
Gas	Deposition	Condensation		Ionization
Plasma			Recombination	

== Measuring cloud point of petroleum products ==
=== Manual method ===
The test oil is required to be transparent in layers 40 mm in thickness (in accordance with ASTM D2500). The wax crystals typically first form at the lower circumferential wall with the appearance of a whitish or milky cloud. The cloud point is the temperature just above where these crystals first appear.

The test sample is first poured into a test jar to a level approximately half full. A cork carrying the test thermometer is used to close the jar. The thermometer bulb is positioned to rest at the bottom of the jar. The entire test subject is then placed in a constant temperature cooling bath on top of a gasket to prevent excessive cooling.

At every 1 °C, the sample is taken out and inspected for cloud then quickly replaced. Successively lower temperature cooling baths may be used depending on the cloud point. Lower temperature cooling bath must have temperature stability not less than 1.5 K for this test.

=== Automatic method ===
ASTM D5773, Standard Test Method of Cloud Point of Petroleum Products (Constant Cooling Rate Method) is an alternative to the manual test procedure. It uses automatic apparatus and has been found to be equivalent to test method D2500.

The D5773 test method determines the cloud point in a shorter period of time than manual method D2500. Less operator time is required to run the test using this automatic method. Additionally, no external chiller bath or refrigeration unit is needed. D5773 is capable of determining cloud point within a temperature range of −60 °C to +49 °C. Results are reported with a temperature resolution of 0.1 °C.

Under ASTM D5773, the test sample is cooled by a Peltier device at a constant rate of 1.5 ± 0.1 °C/min. During this period, the sample is continuously illuminated by a light source. An array of optical detectors continuously monitor the sample for the first appearance of a cloud of wax crystals. The temperature at which the first appearance of wax crystals is detected in the sample is determined to be the cloud point.

== See also ==
- Cold filter plugging point
- Gel point
- Krafft point – visually similar but specific to solutions of surfactants
- Petroleum
- Pour point
