= Pennsylvania Railroad class J1 =

Class of 2-10-4 steam locomotives

Pennsylvania Railroad J1
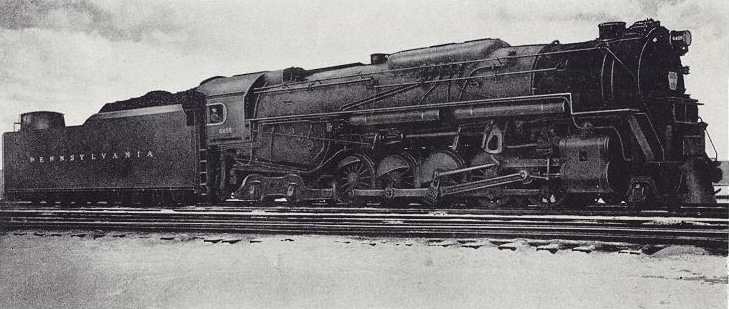
Type and origin
- Power type: Steam
- Builder: PRR Altoona Works
- Build date: 1942–1944
- Total produced: 125
Specifications
- Configuration
  - Whyte: 2-10-4
  - UIC: 1′E2′ h
- Gauge: 4 ft 8 1/2 in (1,435 mm)
- Driver dia.: 69 in (1.753 m), later 70 in (1.778 m)
- Length: 117 ft 8 in (35.86 m)
- Width: 11 ft 3 in (3.43 m)
- Height: 16 ft 5.5 in (5.02 m)
- Adhesive weight: 377,800 lb (171.4 t)
- Loco weight: J-1 class: 589,975 lb (267.6 t); J-1a class: 579,975 lb (263.1 t)
- Tender weight: 411,500 lb (186.7 t)
- Total weight: J-1 class: 1,001,475 lb (454.3 t); J-1a class: 991,475 lb (449.7 t)
- Tender type: Coast-to-Coast
- Fuel type: Coal
- Fuel capacity: 60,000 lb (27.2 t)
- Water cap.: 21,000 US gal (79,000 L; 17,000 imp gal)
- Firebox
  - Grate area: 122 sq ft (11.3 m^{2})
- Boiler: 106 in (2,692 mm)
- Boiler pressure: 270 psi (1.86 MPa)
- Cylinders: Two
- Cylinder size: 29 in × 34 in (737 mm × 864 mm)
- Valve gear: Baker
Performance figures
- Maximum speed: 50 mph (80 km/h)
- Power output: 5,644 hp (4,209 kW)
- Tractive effort: 95,100 lbf (423.0 kN); Booster: 15,000 lb (6.8 t); Loco w/Booster: 110,100 lb (49.9 t)
Career
- Numbers: 6150–6174, 6401–6500
- Nicknames: War Babies
- Locale: Pennsylvania Railroad
- Retired: 1958-1959
- Scrapped: 1958-1959
- Disposition: All scrapped: Number 6435 rumored to be buried

The PRR J1 was a class of 2-10-4 "Texas" type steam locomotives built between 1942 and 1944. The J1 locomotives had over 95,000 pounds-force (422.6 kN) of tractive effort, plus an additional 15,000 lbf (66.7 kN) including the booster engine.

== Features ==
As with many of the Pennsylvania Railroad's steam locomotives, the J1 had its headlight above the smokebox. Like the M1 the J1 had a keystone numberplate, unlike the round numberplates seen on the rest of the PRR's freight steam locomotives. Wartime restrictions forbid the design of a completely new engine so the PRR basically adopted the C&O design almost without change. As a result, they were equipped with Baker valve gear instead of Walschaerts valve gear which was more common on the PRR. Additionally, they had radial-stay fireboxes instead of the Belpaire fireboxes seen on nearly all of the Pennsylvania Railroad's steam locomotives. Mechanically, these locomotives were identical to the C&O's class T-1 2-10-4s.

As initially built, the middle driver was blind to facilitate tracking on curves, which was later determined to be unnecessary, and flanges were added later on. Other changes to the driving wheels included counterbalancing, as it was found in service that the J1s ran roughly like their T-1 counterparts. This was also fixed in later shopping, also increasing the driver diameter to 70 in (1,800 mm). The engine had lateral motion devices to allow sideways drive axle travel which did enable it to work on PRR curves. Other changes included the curved front side cab windows and the cast pilot with drop coupler.

== History ==
During World War II, the PRR needed heavier locomotives to pull freight and military equipment, but wartime restrictions prohibited the development of a new locomotive design. In response to this the Pennsylvania Railroad borrowed a 2-6-6-4 Class A of the Norfolk and Western Railway and a 2-10-4 from the Chesapeake and Ohio Railway. Both locomotives underwent extensive testing, with the C&O 2-10-4 chosen to be produced. A total of 125 were built at PRR's Altoona works in Juniata, Pennsylvania; the later 60 locomotives were classified as J1a's. They came to be known as the PRR's "War Babies," but the J1's remained in service into the 1950s.

When the Pennsylvania Railroad converted from steam power to diesel, 100 were scrapped in 1958 and the remaining 25 were scrapped the next year; however, a former J1 bell is preserved.

There is rumor and legend that one of these engines was buried in a railyard in PA, however these are incredibly far-fetched, and even if true, the locomotive would have decayed beyond repair or recognition in the current era. Further, scrapping records of this engine were found at a later time, proving its scrapping.
