= Pour point =

Temperature below which a liquid loses its ability to flow

The pour point of a liquid is the temperature below which the liquid loses its flow characteristics. It is defined as the minimum temperature in which the oil has the ability to pour down from a beaker. In crude oil a high pour point is generally associated with a high paraffin content, typically found in crude deriving from a larger proportion of plant material. That type of crude oil is mainly derived from a kerogen Type III.

== Measuring the pour point of petroleum products ==
=== Manual method ===
ASTM D97, Standard Test Method for Pour Point of Crude Oils. The specimen is cooled inside a cooling bath to allow the formation of paraffin wax crystals. At about 9 °C (16 °F) above the expected pour point, and for every subsequent 3 °C (5.4 °F), the test jar is removed and tilted to check for surface movement. When the specimen does not flow when tilted, the jar is held horizontally for 5 seconds. If it does not flow, 3 °C is added to the corresponding temperature and the result is the pour point temperature.

It is also useful to note that failure to flow at the pour point may also be due to the effect of viscosity or the previous thermal history of the specimen. Therefore, the pour point may give a misleading view of the handling properties of the oil. Additional fluidity tests may also be undertaken. An approximate range of pour point can be observed from the specimen's upper and lower pour point.

=== Automatic method ===
ASTM D5949, Standard Test Method for Pour Point of Petroleum Products (Automatic Pressure Pulsing Method) is an alternative to the manual test procedure. It uses automatic apparatus and yields pour point results in a format similar to the manual method (ASTM D97) when reporting at a 3 °C.

The D5949 test method determines the pour point in a shorter period of time than manual method D97. Less operator time is required to run the test using this automatic method. Additionally, no external chiller bath or refrigeration unit is needed. D5949 is capable of determining pour point within a temperature range of −57 to 51 °C (−71 to 124 °F). Results can be reported at 1 °C (1.8 °F) or 3 °C testing intervals. This test method has better repeatability and reproducibility than manual method D97.

Under ASTM D5949, the test sample is heated and then cooled by a Peltier device at a rate of 1.5±0.1 °C/min. At either 1 °C or 3 °C intervals, a pressurized pulse of compressed gas is imparted onto the surface of the sample. Multiple optical detectors continuously monitor the sample for movement. The lowest temperature at which movement is detected on the sample surface is determined to be the pour point.

== Measuring the pour point of crude oils ==
Two pour points can be derived which can give an approximate temperature window depending on its thermal history. Within this temperature range, the sample may appear liquid or solid. This happens because wax crystals form less readily when it has been heated within the past 24 hours and contributes to the lower pour point.

The upper pour point is measured by pouring the test sample directly into a test jar. The sample is then cooled and inspected for pour point as per the usual pour point method. The method usually gives higher pour point because the thermal history has not been cancelled by a prolonged thermal treatment.

The lower pour point is measured by first pouring the sample into a stainless steel pressure vessel. The vessel is then screwed tight and heated to above 102 °C (216 °F) in an oil bath. After a specified time, the vessel is removed and cooled for a short while. The sample is then poured into a test jar and immediately closed with a cork carrying the thermometer. The sample is then cooled and then inspected for pour point as per the usual pour point method.

== See also ==
- Melting point
- Cloud point
- Cold filter plugging point
- Crude oil assay
- Gel point (petroleum)
- Petroleum
- Viscosity
- Wax
