= 4-4-6-4 =

Duplex locomotive wheel arrangement

A 4-4-6-4, in the Whyte notation for the classification of steam locomotives by wheel arrangement, is one that has four leading wheels followed by four coupled driving wheels, a second set of six coupled driving wheels and four trailing wheels.

The Pennsylvania Railroad's Q2 class were the only locomotives ever to use this arrangement. These were duplex locomotives, in which both sets of driving wheels were mounted in a common, rigid locomotive frame. This locomotive design was a further development of the highly successful 2-10-4. The divided drive, or duplex arrangement, allowed for higher speeds with less damage to the track.

A proposed design for the Lehigh Valley Railroad was done but it was never built.

Other equivalent classifications are:
UIC classification: 2BC2 (also known as German classification and Italian classification)
French classification: 2232
Turkish classification: 2435
Swiss classification: 2/4+3/5 up to the early 1920s, later 5/9
